= Pan-European Corridor IV =

Road in Europe

- Pan-European Corridor IV highlighted in red

Major junctions
- Start end: Dresden/Nuremberg (Germany)
- End end: Thessaloniki (Greece) / Constanța (Romania) / Istanbul (Turkey)

Location
- Countries: Germany, Czech Republic, Slovakia, Hungary, Romania, Bulgaria, Greece and Turkey.

Highway system
- Pan-European corridors

The Corridor IV is one of the Pan-European transport corridors. It runs between Dresden/Nuremberg in Germany and Thessaloniki (Greece) / Constanța (Romania) / Istanbul (Turkey). The corridor follows the route: Dresden / Nuremberg – Prague – Vienna – Bratislava – Győr – Budapest – Arad – Bucharest – Constanța / Craiova – Sofia – Pernik - Thessaloniki or Plovdiv – Istanbul.

The corridor is the shortest land connection between Greece and Central Europe completely within EU territory. The road corridor is 3,640 km.

It bypasses the countries of former Yugoslavia and the former Brotherhood and Unity Highway (now part of Pan-European Corridor X).

== The road corridor ==
=== Germany ===
Comprises the A17 from Dresden 45 km to the Czech border, and the A6 (E50) from Nuremberg 130 km to the Czech border at Waidhaus.

=== the Czech Republic ===
Comprises D8 (E55) motorway from the Germany border at Cínovec 93 km via Teplice to Prague, D5 (E50) Via Carolina motorway south-west from Prague 151 km via Plzeň to Bavaria at Rozvadov, and 317 km from Prague as D1 to Brno and D2 to Slovakia near Břeclav as E50/E65.

=== Slovakia ===
The corridor runs 83 km from the Czech Republic via Bratislava to Hungary as D2 (E65).

=== Hungary ===
The corridor runs 398 km from Slovakia at Rajka via Budapest to Romania at Nagylak, and includes the M1 motorway (E60/E75) from Budapest 156 km via Győr to Austria where it connects with the A4 70 km to Vienna, the M15 expressway from M1 to the Slovak border, M0 expressway around Budapest 136 km to M5 (E60/E75), and M43 from M5 at Szeged to the Romanian border.

=== Romania ===
There are two branches. The northern branch runs from Hungary at Nadlac 663 km as DN7 E68 via Arad and Hunedoara and E81 via Deva, Sibiu and Pitesti to Bucharest. From Bucharest E81 continues as A2 Motorway of the Sun (completed 2012) east 206 km to A4 in Constanta on the Black Sea.

The Southern branch runs from Arad via Timisoara and Craiova to Bulgaria by the Vidin–Calafat Bridge or New European toll Bridge (2013) across Danube river, which is an important part of the route as one of only two bridges connecting Romania and Bulgaria.

=== Bulgaria ===
I-1 (E79) runs 235 km from Vidin to Sofia via the Botevgrad-Vidin expressway and the Hemus motorway, and continues 201 km south to Greece at Kulata via the Struma motorway. The main branch runs 278 km from Sofia as A4/I-8 (E80) to the Turkish border at Kapitan Andreevo where E80 continues 228 km via Erdine as D.100 to Istanbul

=== Greece ===
A25 (E79) runs 104 km via Serres to Thessaloniki.

== The rail corridor ==
The rail corridor is 4,340 km and includes

=== Germany ===
KBS 241 the 66 km electrified Elbe Valley Line from Dresden in Saxony via Pirna at Schöna to the Czech Republic at Děčín.

KBS 860 the Nuremberg-Cheb line 151 km via Lauf an der Pegnitz, Hersbruck, Pegnitz, Kirchenlaibach and Marktredwitz to the Czech Republic at Schirnding.

=== the Czech Republic ===
Nº 083 (formerly 098) the 66 km double track electrified Děčín–Dresden railway line from Děčín via Pirna to Prague as part of the First Railway Corridor.

Nº 170 the Third Railway Corridor electrified southwest from Prague 219 km via Plezň (dual track electrified) to Cheb.

Nº 250/260 dual track electrified south from Česka Třebová via Brno to Slovakia at Kuty.

=== Austria ===
the North Railway from the Czech border at Břeclav 88 km double track electrified from Bernhardsthal to Vienna.

the Parndorf Bratislava branch line from the Wien – Budapest main line at Parndorf 21 km single track electrified via Kittsee to the Slovak border at Petrzalka.

the Eastern Railway from the Hungarian border at Hegyeshalom 70 km double track electrified to Vienna.

=== Slovakia ===
252 km double track electrified comprising the Bratislava–Kúty Line 110 from the Czech Republic via Kuty to Bratislava, and the Bratislava–Štúrovo Line 130 from Bratislava 149 km via Galanta, Nove Zamky to Hungary at Štúrovo, with the parallel single track electrified Bratislava–Hegyeshalom railway Line 132 from Bratislava 33 km to Hungary at Rusovce.

=== Hungary ===
The Budapest–Hegyeshalom railway Line 1 double track electrified from Budapest 193 km to Austria and Slovakia at Hegyeshalom.

The Budapest–Újszász–Szolnok railway Line 120A from Budapest 100 km double track electrified to Szolnok and Line 120 from Szolnok 125 km via Békéscsaba to Arad at Lőkösháza.

=== Romania ===
Line 200 from Hungary at Lököshaza electrified north and west from Arad via Deva, Vințu de Jos, and Sibiu to Brașov, where the Northern Branch runs 880 km via Brasov and Bucharest as Line 800 east via Fetești and Cernavodă to Constanța on the Black Sea, while the Southern Branch rums 400 km via Timisoara as Line 100 and Craiova as Line 912 to Calafat.

=== Bulgaria ===
264 km as BDZ Line 7, electrified, mostly single track south from the New Europe Bridge at Vidin to Mezdra, and BDZ Line 2, electrified. mostly double track from Mezdra to Sofia.

BDZ Line 1 east from Sofia electrified (double track as far as Plovdiv) 320 km via Dimitrovgrad and Svilengrad to Turkey at Kapitan Andreevo to Istanbul.

BDZ Line 5 south from Sofia 210 km electrified via Pernik and Radomir (double track) and single track via Dupnitza to Greece at Kulata.

=== Greece ===
South from Promahonass 144 km single track as the 17.5 km Strymon-Kulata railway to the Thessaloniki–Alexandroupolis railway.
