= Mosonmagyaróvár railway station =

Railway station in Mosonmagyaróvár, Hungary

Mosonmagyaróvár
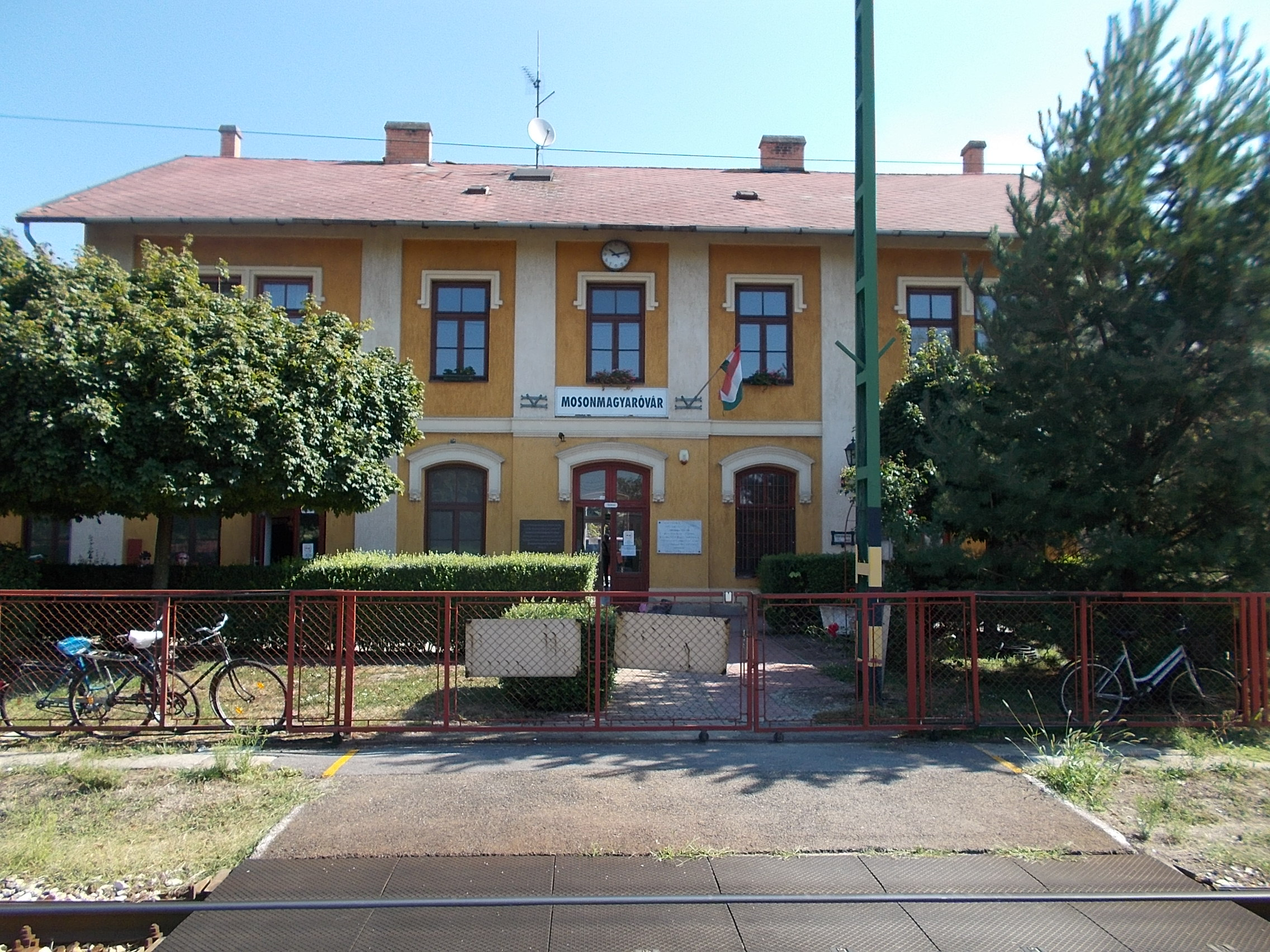
- Mosonmagyaróvár railway station

General information
- Location: Mosonmagyaróvár; Hungary
- Coordinates: 47°50′59″N 17°16′03″E
- Owner: Hungarian State Railways (MÁV)
- Line: Line 1 Budapest–Hegyeshalom railway
- Platforms: 3

History
- Opened: 24 December 1855

Services
Preceding station	ÖBB	Following station
Hegyeshalom towards München Hbf	Railjet Express	Győr towards Budapest Keleti
Hegyeshalom towards Zürich HB	Railjet Express	Győr towards Budapest Keleti
Hegyeshalom towards Bruck an der Leitha	REX 62	Kimle-Károlyháza towards Győr
Preceding station	MÁV START	Following station
Hegyeshalom towards Wien Hbf	EuroCity	Győr towards Budapest Keleti
Hegyeshalom towards Wien Hbf	EuroCity	Győr towards Cluj Napoca
Hegyeshalom towards Salzburg Hbf, Stuttgart Hbf or Zürich HB	EuroNight Kálmán Imre	Győr towards Budapest Keleti
Hegyeshalom towards Wien Hbf	Dacia–Corvin Express	Győr towards Bucharest North
Levél towards Rajka	Személyvonat	Kimle-Károlyháza towards Győr
Location
- Location within Hungary

Mosonmagyaróvár railway station (Hungarian: Mosonmagyaróvár vasútállomás) is a railway station in Mosonmagyaróvár, Győr-Moson-Sopron County, Hungary. The station opened on 24 December 1855. It is located on the main line between Vienna and Budapest (Line 1 Budapest–Hegyeshalom railway). Train services are operated by MÁV START.

== Services ==
As of the June 2023 timetable change, the following services stop at Mosonmagyaróvár:

- Railjet: services between Zürich HB, München, and Budapest Keleti.
- EuroCity: services between Wien, Budapest Keleti, and Cluj Napoca.
- Overnight trains:
  - Dacia–Corvin Express: service between Wien and Bucharest North.
  - Kálmán Imre: service between Salzburg and Budapest Keleti.
- Regional-Express: service every two hours between Győr and Bruck an der Leitha.
- Személyvonat: service every two hours between Győr and Rajka.
