= Hegyeshalom railway station =

Railway station in Hungary

Hegyeshalom
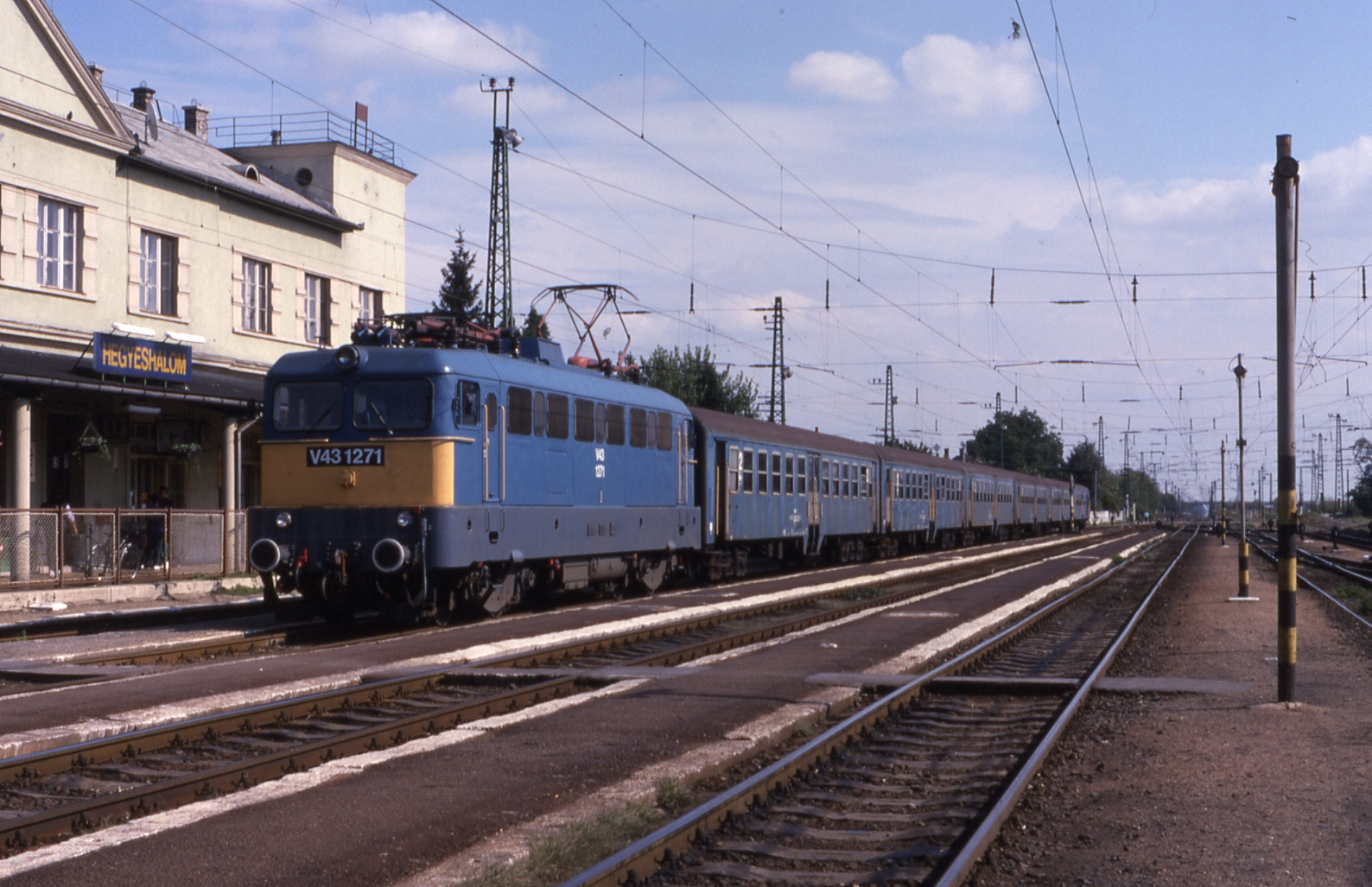
- Hegyeshalom railway station

General information
- Location: Hegyeshalom; Hungary
- Coordinates: 47°54′47″N 17°08′48″E
- Owner: Hungarian State Railways (MÁV)
- Lines: Line 1 Budapest–Hegyeshalom railway Ostbahn Vienna-Hegyeshalom; Line 16 Hegyeshalom–Szombathely railway Line 132 Bratislava–Hegyeshalom railway
- Platforms: 5

History
- Opened: 24 December 1855

Services
Preceding station	ÖBB	Following station
Wien Hbf towards München Hbf	Railjet Express	Mosonmagyaróvár towards Budapest Keleti
Wien Hbf towards Zürich HB	Railjet Express	Mosonmagyaróvár towards Budapest Keleti
Nickelsdorf towards Bruck an der Leitha	REX 62	Levél towards Győr
Preceding station	MÁV START	Following station
Wien Hbf Terminus	EuroCity	Mosonmagyaróvár towards Budapest Keleti
Wien Hbf Terminus	EuroCity	Mosonmagyaróvár towards Cluj Napoca
Wien Hbf towards Salzburg Hbf, Stuttgart Hbf or Zürich HB	EuroNight Kálmán Imre	Mosonmagyaróvár towards Budapest Keleti
Wien Hbf Terminus	Dacia–Corvin Express	Mosonmagyaróvár towards Bucharest North
Bezenye towards Rajka	Személyvonat	Mosonszolnok towards Csorna
Bezenye towards Rajka	Személyvonat	Levél towards Győr
Preceding station	ZSSK	Following station
Bezenye towards Bratislava-Petržalka	Osobný vlak	Terminus
Location
- Location within Hungary

Hegyeshalom (Hungarian: Hegyeshalom vasútállomás) is a railway station in Hegyeshalom, Győr-Moson-Sopron County, Hungary. Opened on 24 December 1855, it is an important border station between Austria and Hungary. The station is located on the main line between Vienna and Budapest (Line 1 Budapest–Hegyeshalom railway and the Ostbahn) and also Line 16 Hegyeshalom–Szombathely railway and Line 132 Bratislava–Hegyeshalom railway. The train services are operated by MÁV START.

The station has a plinthed MÁV Class 411 steam locomotive.

== Services ==
As of the June 2023 timetable change, the following services stop at Mosonmagyaróvár:

- Railjet: services between Zürich HB, München, and Budapest Keleti.
- EuroCity: services between Wien, Budapest Keleti, and Cluj Napoca.
- Overnight trains:
  - Dacia–Corvin Express: service between Wien and Bucharest North.
  - Kálmán Imre: service between Salzburg and Budapest Keleti.
- Regional-Express: service every two hours between Győr and Bruck an der Leitha.
- Személyvonat: service every two hours between Győr, Rajka, and Csorna.
- Osobný vlak: three trains per day to Bratislava-Petržalka.
