= Károly Palotai =

Hungarian footballer and referee

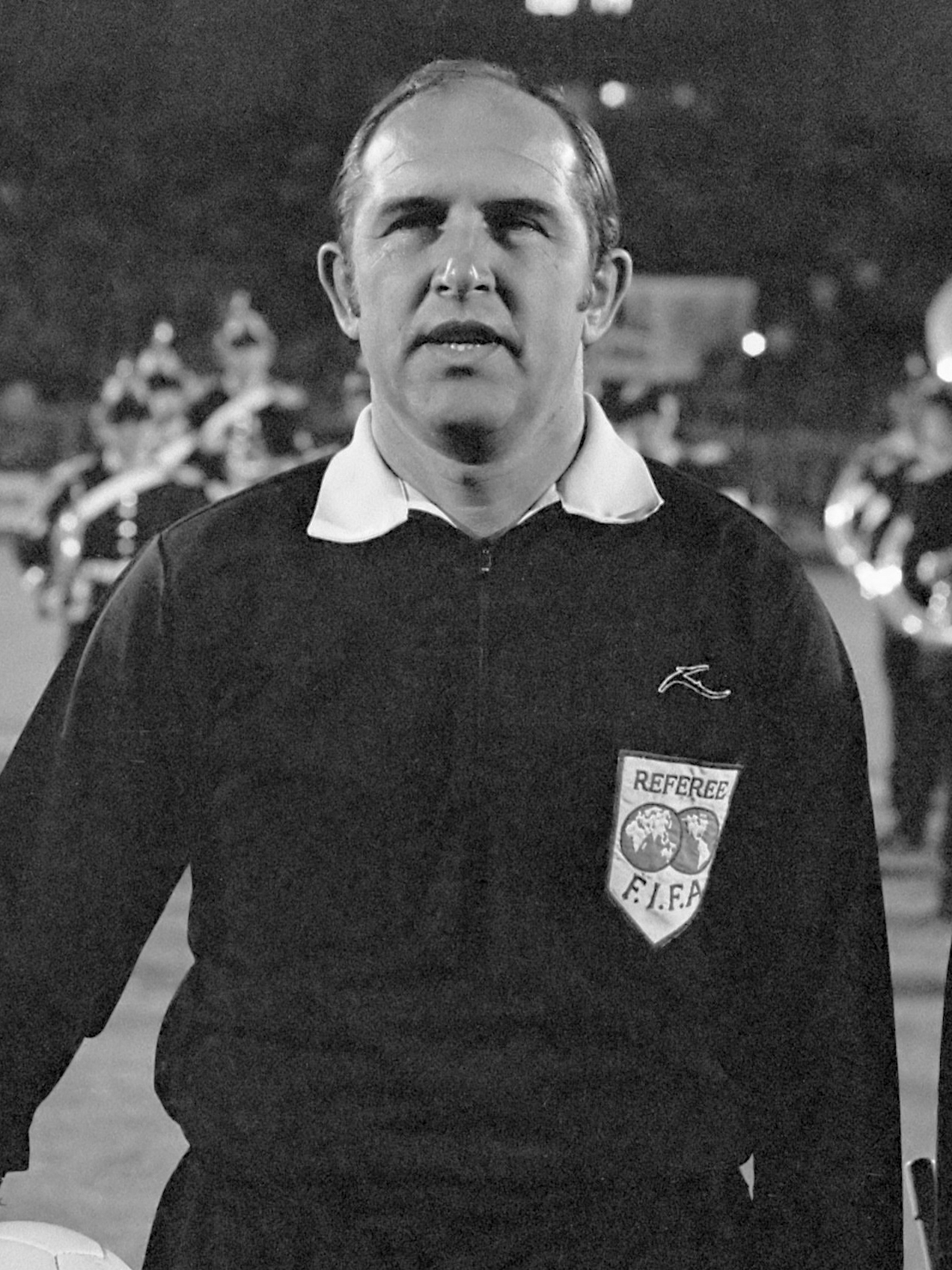
- Palotai in 1975

Personal information
- Date of birth: 11 September 1935
- Place of birth: Békéscsaba, Hungary
- Date of death: 3 February 2018 (aged 82)
- Place of death: Győr, Hungary
- Height: 1.75 m (5 ft 9 in)
- Position: Midfielder

Senior career*
| Years | Team | Apps | (Gls) |
| 1953–1955 | Békéscsaba Előre | | |
| 1955–1956 | Győri Vasas ETO | | |
| 1956–1958 | Freiburger FC | | |
| 1959–1967 | Győri Vasas ETO | 171 | (45) |

International career
| 1963–1964 | Hungary Olympic | 15 | (2) |
Medal record
Men's football
Representing Hungary
Olympic Games
| Gold medal – first place | 1964 Tokyo | Team competition |
Refereeing career
Domestic
| Years | League | Role |
| 1969–1983 | Nemzeti Bajnokság I | Referee |
International
| Years | League | Role |
| 1970–1984 | FIFA listed | Referee |
- * Club domestic league appearances and goals

Károly Palotai (11 September 1935 – 3 February 2018) was a Hungarian association football player and referee. He was an Olympic Gold winner as a player before turning to refereeing. He was a referee at three World Cup tournaments and officiated in two European Cup finals.

== Playing career ==
He was a successful player with Győri ETO FC and also won a gold medal at the football tournament of the 1964 Olympic Games in Tokyo, when Hungary defeated Czechoslovakia in the final 2–1.

== Refereeing career ==
Károly Palotai was a referee in the FIFA World Cups 1974, 1978 and 1982, as well as in the European Championship 1980 and the 1972 Olympic Games in Munich and the 1976 Olympic Games in Montreal. In addition, he officiated the finals of the European Champions' Cup 1976 between Bayern Munich and AS Saint-Etienne and 1981 between Real Madrid and Liverpool FC, the European Cup Winners' Cup final of 1979 between FC Barcelona and Fortuna Düsseldorf and the first leg of the finals of the UEFA Cup 1974–75 between Borussia Mönchengladbach and FC Twente Enschede.

== Personal life ==
He is the father of Budapest-based DJ and co-founder of the radio station Tilos Radio, Zsolt Palotai.
