= Győr =

City with county rights in Hungary

- City with county rights
- Győr Megyei Jogú Város
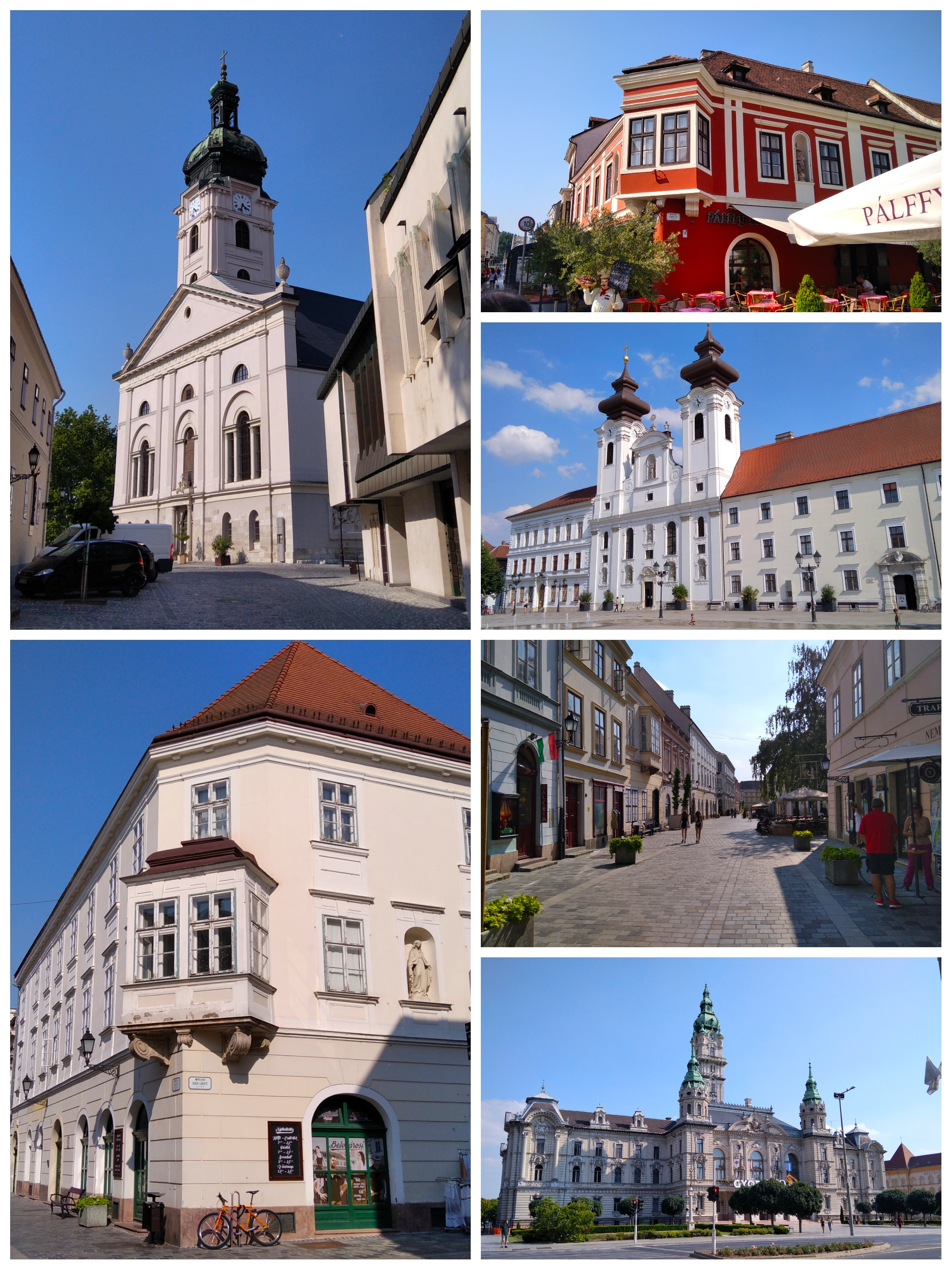
- Clockwise, from top to bottom: Cathedral Basilica of Győr, baroque architecture in Győr, Benedictine Church of Saint Ignatius of Loyola, street in the city center, City Hall, baroque architecture

- Flag Coat of arms

- Location within Győr-Moson-Sopron County Location within Hungary
- Coordinates: 47.6842°N 17.6344°E
- Country: Hungary
- Region: Western Transdanubia
- County: Győr-Moson-Sopron
- District: Győr

Government
  - Mayor: Bence Pintér

Area
  - City with county rights: 174.62 km^{2} (67.42 sq mi)
- Elevation: 108 m (354 ft)

Population (1 January 2017)
  - City with county rights: 129,301
  - Urban (7th): 246,159
- Demonym: győri

Population by ethnicity
  - Hungarians: 84.5%
  - Germans: 1.5%
  - Romani: 0.8%
  - Others: 1.7%

Population by religion
  - Roman Catholic: 44.9%
  - Evangelicals: 4.3%
  - Calvinists: 4.1%
  - Other: 1.5%
  - Non-religious: 14.2%
- Time zone: UTC+1 (CET)
  - Summer (DST): UTC+2 (CEST)
- Postal code: 9000 to 9030
- Area code: (+36) 96
- Motorways: M1, M19, M85
- NUTS 3 code: HU221
- Distance from Budapest: 121 km (75 mi) East
- International Airport: Győr (QGY)
- MP: Róbert Balázs Simon (Fidesz); Ákos Kara (Fidesz)
- Website: gyor.hu

Győr (US: /djɜːr, dʒɜːr/ DYUR, JUR, Hungarian: [ɟøːr]; German: Raab; names in other languages) is the main city of northwest Hungary, the capital of Győr-Moson-Sopron County and Western Transdanubia region, and – halfway between Budapest and Vienna – situated on one of the important roads of Central Europe. It is the sixth largest city in Hungary, and one of its seven main regional centres. The city has county rights.

== History ==
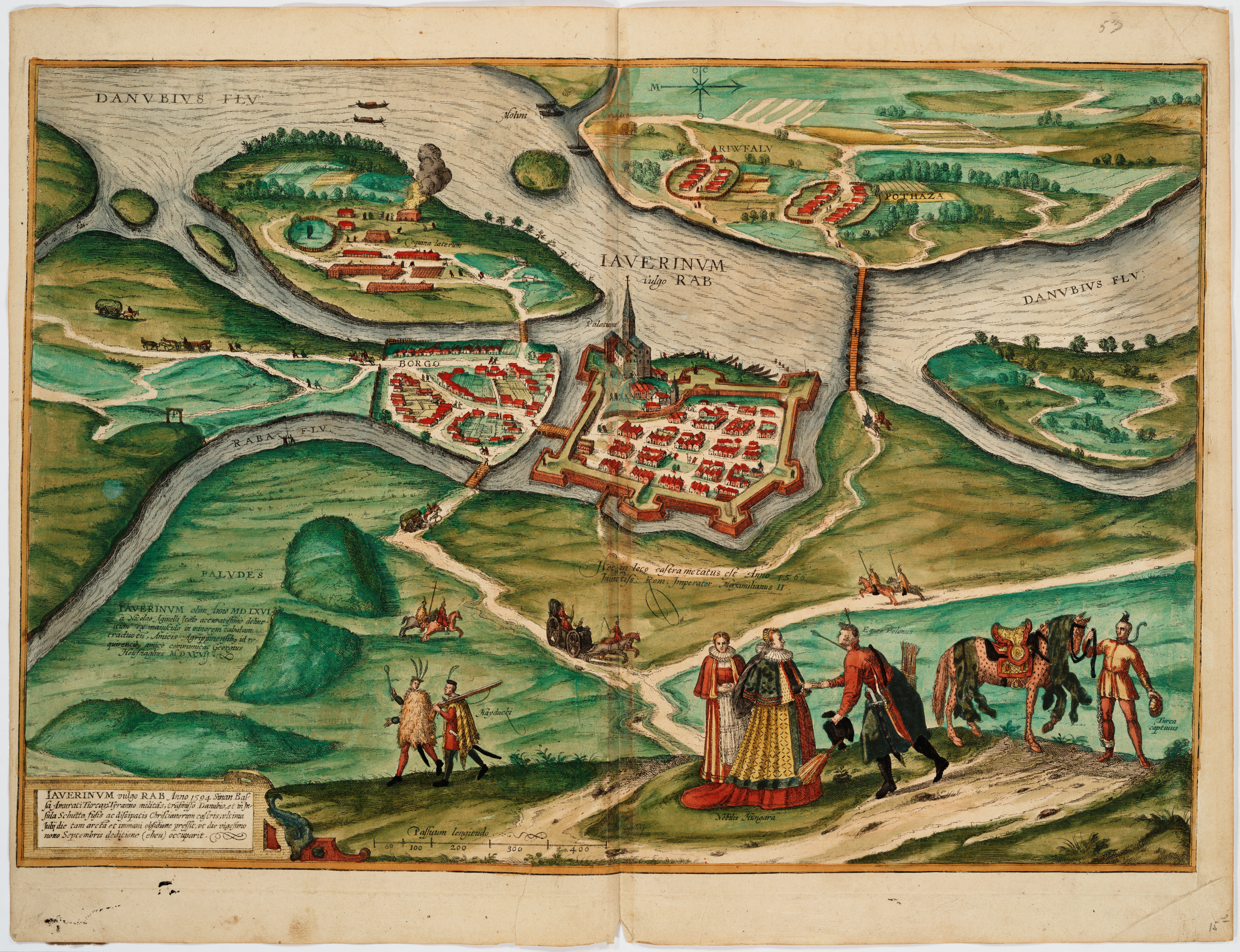
View of Győr engraved by Georg Hoefnagel after a drawing by Nicolò Angielini, 1597

The area along the Danube River has been inhabited by varying cultures since ancient times. The first large settlement dates back to the 5th century BCE and its inhabitants were Celts. They called the town Ara Bona 'good altar', later contracted to Arrabona, a name which was used until the eighth century. Its shortened form is still used as the German (Raab) and Slovak (Ráb) names of the city.

Roman merchants moved to Arrabona during the 1st century BCE. Around 10 CE, the Roman army occupied the northern part of Western Hungary, which they called Pannonia. Although the Roman Empire abandoned the area in the 4th century due to constant attacks by the tribes living to the east, the town remained inhabited.

Around 500 the territory was settled by Slavs, in 547 by the Lombards, and in 568 – c. 800 by the Avars, at that time under Frankish and Slavic influence. During this time the city was called Rabba and later Raab. Between 880 and 894, it was part of Great Moravia, and then briefly under East Frankish dominance.

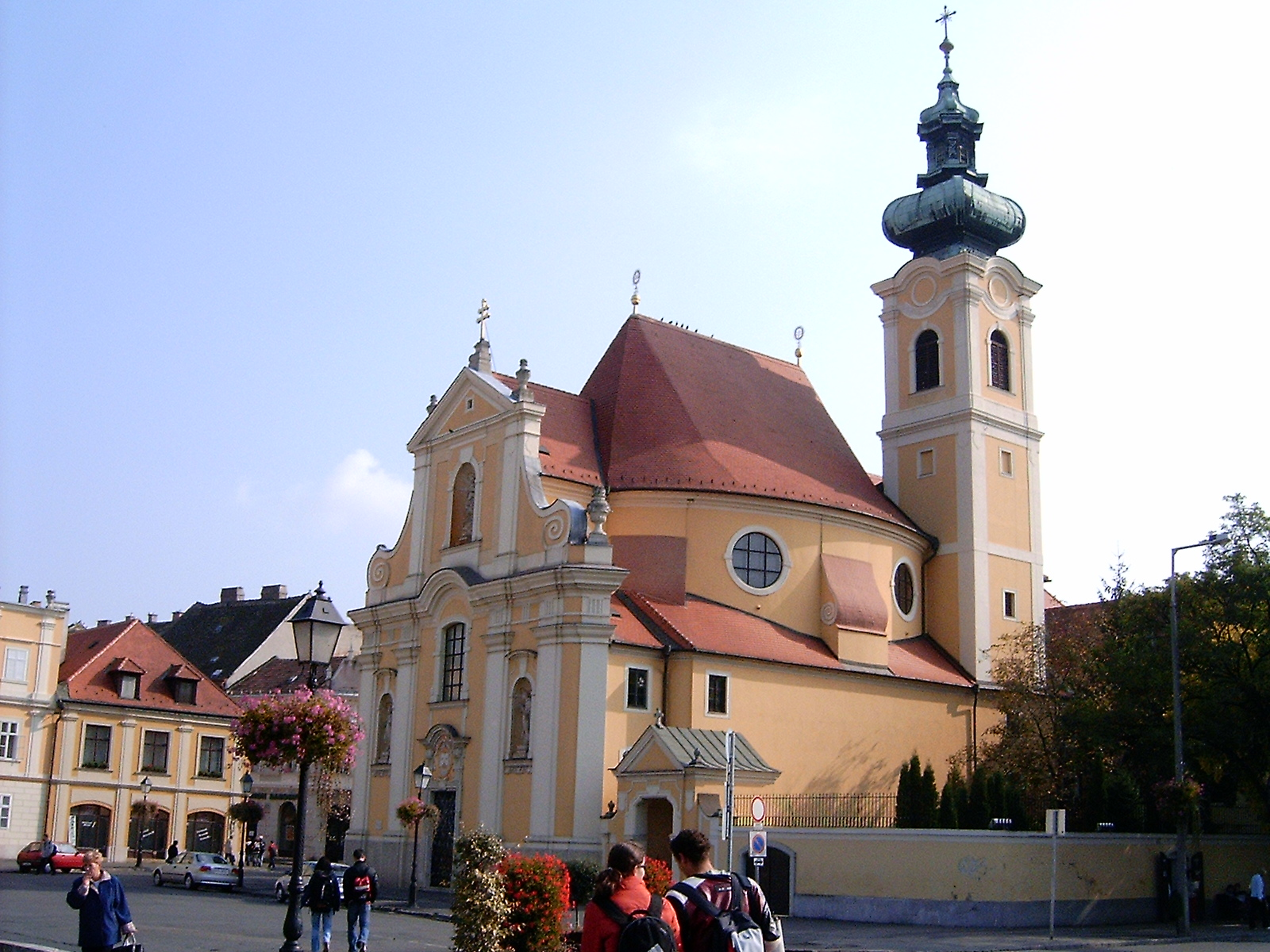
Carmelite church in Győr

The Magyars occupied the town around 900 and fortified the abandoned Roman fortress. Stephen I, the first king of Hungary, founded an episcopate there. The town received its Hungarian name Győr, which likely derives from Old Hungarian personal name Győr, who could be the county's first count. The town was affected by all the trials and tribulations of the history of Hungary: it was occupied by Mongols during the Mongol invasion (1241–1242) and then was destroyed by the Czech army in 1271.

After the disastrous battle of Mohács, Baron Tamás Nádasdy and Count György Cseszneky occupied the town for King Ferdinand I while John Zápolya also was attempting to annex it. During the Ottoman occupation of present-day central and eastern Hungary (1541 – late 17th century), Győr's commander Kristóf Lamberg thought it would be futile to try to defend the town from the Turkish army and chose instead to burn it down. The Turkish forces found nothing but blackened ruins, hence the Turkish name for Győr, Yanık kale ('burnt castle').

During rebuilding, the town was surrounded with a castle and a city wall designed by the leading Italian builders of the era. The town changed in character during these years, with many new buildings built in Renaissance style, but the main square and the grid of streets remained.

In 1594, during the Long Turkish War and after the death of Count János Cseszneky, captain of Hungarian footsoldiers, the Ottoman army occupied the castle and the town. In 1598 the Hungarian and Austrian army took control of it again and occupied it. During the Turkish occupation the city was called Yanık Kala (یانق قلعه, 'burned castle', as a reference to the enormous damages caused by the siege).

In 1683, the Turks returned briefly, only to leave after being defeated in the Battle of Vienna.

During the following centuries, the town became prosperous. In 1743 Győr was elevated to free royal town status by empress Maria Theresa. The Jesuits and Carmelites religious orders settled there, building schools, churches, a hospital, and a monastery.

On 14 June 1809, during the War of the Fifth Coalition, the city was the site of the Battle of Raab, its German name, where the army of Eugène de Beauharnais defeated the Hungarian "noble insurrection" (militia) and an Austrian corps under the Archdukes Joseph and John. Napoleon's forces occupied the castle and had some of its walls blown up. The leaders of the town soon realized that the old ramparts no longer provided useful protection. Most of them were destroyed, allowing the town to expand.

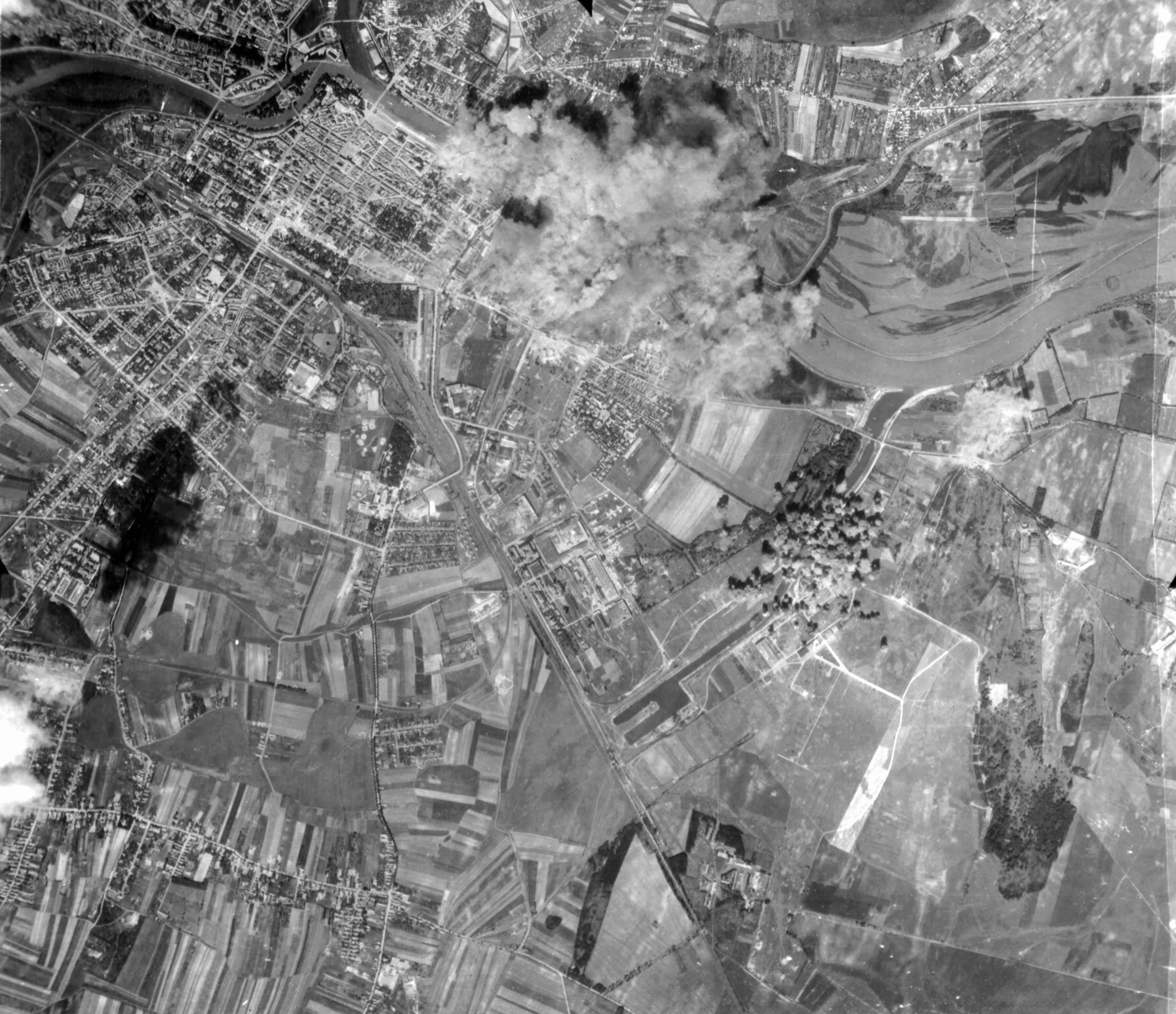
Allied bombing raid against Győr, late 1944

In the mid-19th century, Győr's role in trade grew as steamship traffic on the River Danube began. The town lost its importance in trade when the railway line between Budapest and Kanizsa superseded river traffic after 1861. The town leaders compensated for this loss with industrialisation. The town prospered until World War II when several buildings were destroyed. Some large-scale strategic bombing devastated industrial and residential areas as well as the airport. It was targeted because the Rába factory was a main tank (Turán) and aeroplane (Bf 109) producer. One of these raids destroyed some parts of the maternity hospital.

Historical population
Year	Pop.	±%
1870	21,767	—
1890	28,175	+29.4%
1900	38,094	+35.2%
1910	45,083	+18.3%
1920	51,268	+13.7%
1930	52,456	+2.3%
1941	58,431	+11.4%
1949	58,431	+0.0%
1960	72,060	+23.3%
1970	102,600	+42.4%
1980	124,147	+21.0%
1990	129,331	+4.2%
2001	129,412	+0.1%
2011	129,527	+0.1%
2022	127,599	−1.5%

The 1950s and '60s brought more change: only big blocks of flats were built, and the old historical buildings were not given care or attention. In the 1970s the reconstruction of the city centre began; old buildings were restored and reconstructed. In 1989 Győr won the European award for the protection of monuments.

A 100-year-old Raba factory on the River Danube close to the historical centre is to be replaced by a new community called Városrét. The mixed-use community will have residential and commercial space as well as schools, clinics and parks.

The city's main theatre is the National Theatre of Győr, finished in 1978. It features large ceramic ornaments made by Victor Vasarely.

The city has several historical buildings, for example the castle, and the Lutheran Evangelical Catholic church.

== Climate ==
Győr's climate is classified as oceanic climate (Köppen Cfb) closely bordering on a humid subtropical climate (Köppen Cfa). Among them, the annual average temperature is 11.1 °C (52.0 °F), the hottest month in July is 21.6 °C (70.9 °F), and the coldest month is 0.3 °C (32.5 °F) in January. The annual precipitation is 569.6 millimetres (22.43 in), of which July is the wettest with 64.8 millimetres (2.55 in), while February is the driest with only 26.9 millimetres (1.06 in). The extreme temperature throughout the year ranged from −22.1 °C (−7.8 °F) on 28 December 1996, to 40.6 °C (105.1 °F) on 8 August 2013.

Climate data for Győr, 1991−2020 normals
Month	Jan	Feb	Mar	Apr	May	Jun	Jul	Aug	Sep	Oct	Nov	Dec	Year
Record high °C (°F)	17.5 (63.5)	20.5 (68.9)	23.4 (74.1)	31.2 (88.2)	33.1 (91.6)	36.6 (97.9)	39.6 (103.3)	40.6 (105.1)	33.7 (92.7)	28.1 (82.6)	23.4 (74.1)	17.6 (63.7)	40.6 (105.1)
Mean daily maximum °C (°F)	3.5 (38.3)	6.4 (43.5)	11.6 (52.9)	17.8 (64.0)	22.2 (72.0)	26.0 (78.8)	28.2 (82.8)	27.9 (82.2)	22.3 (72.1)	16.4 (61.5)	9.8 (49.6)	4.2 (39.6)	16.4 (61.5)
Daily mean °C (°F)	0.3 (32.5)	2.1 (35.8)	6.3 (43.3)	11.7 (53.1)	16.2 (61.2)	19.9 (67.8)	21.6 (70.9)	21.1 (70.0)	16.2 (61.2)	10.9 (51.6)	6.0 (42.8)	1.3 (34.3)	11.1 (52.0)
Mean daily minimum °C (°F)	−2.7 (27.1)	−1.6 (29.1)	1.7 (35.1)	5.9 (42.6)	10.3 (50.5)	14.1 (57.4)	15.6 (60.1)	15.0 (59.0)	11.0 (51.8)	6.6 (43.9)	2.8 (37.0)	−1.4 (29.5)	6.4 (43.5)
Record low °C (°F)	−18.4 (−1.1)	−20.4 (−4.7)	−15.2 (4.6)	−6.1 (21.0)	−1.4 (29.5)	3.6 (38.5)	7.3 (45.1)	6.8 (44.2)	0.5 (32.9)	−9.5 (14.9)	−11.5 (11.3)	−22.1 (−7.8)	−22.1 (−7.8)
Average precipitation mm (inches)	32.7 (1.29)	26.9 (1.06)	37.5 (1.48)	35.8 (1.41)	63.1 (2.48)	59.1 (2.33)	64.8 (2.55)	58.4 (2.30)	59.3 (2.33)	48.2 (1.90)	46.4 (1.83)	37.4 (1.47)	569.6 (22.43)
Average precipitation days (≥ 1.0 mm)	6.3	6.2	7.1	5.6	8.3	7.2	7.7	6.3	6.8	6.5	7.6	6.7	82.3
Average relative humidity (%)	82.2	75.8	68.5	63.2	66.5	67.0	66.5	68.5	74.1	78.9	82.4	84.0	73.1
Mean monthly sunshine hours	60	97	138	189	247	250	268	259	188	143	73	51	1,963
Source 1: Meteorological Service of Hungary (sun 1981-2010)
Source 2: NOAA

== Main sights ==
The ancient core of the city is Káptalan Hill at the confluence of three rivers: the Mosoni-Danube, Rába, and Rábca. Püspökvár, the residence of Győr's bishops, can be easily recognized by its incomplete tower. Győr's oldest buildings are the 13th-century dwelling tower and the 15th-century Gothic Dóczy Chapel. The cathedral, originally in Romanesque style, was rebuilt in Gothic and Baroque style.

Other sights include:

- Town Hall
- Benedictine church of St. Ignatius of Loyola
- Carmelite church
- Museum of Roman Archaeology
- Jedlik fountain

The Pannonhalma Archabbey is located some 20 km (12 miles) outside the town.

=== Renovation ===
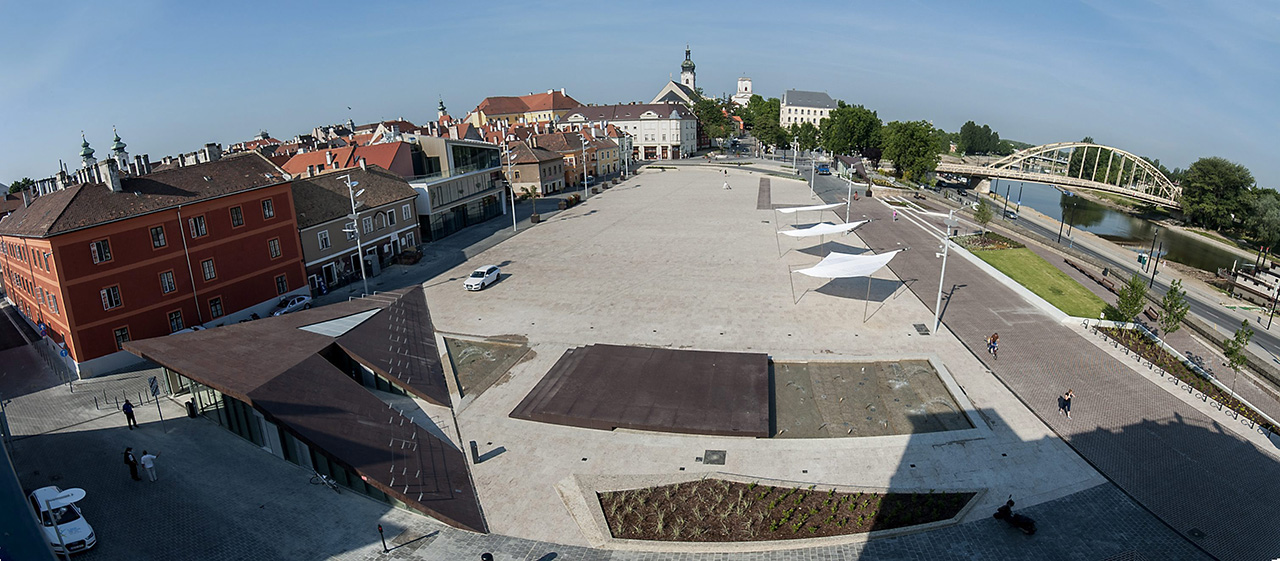
The new Dunakapu Tér

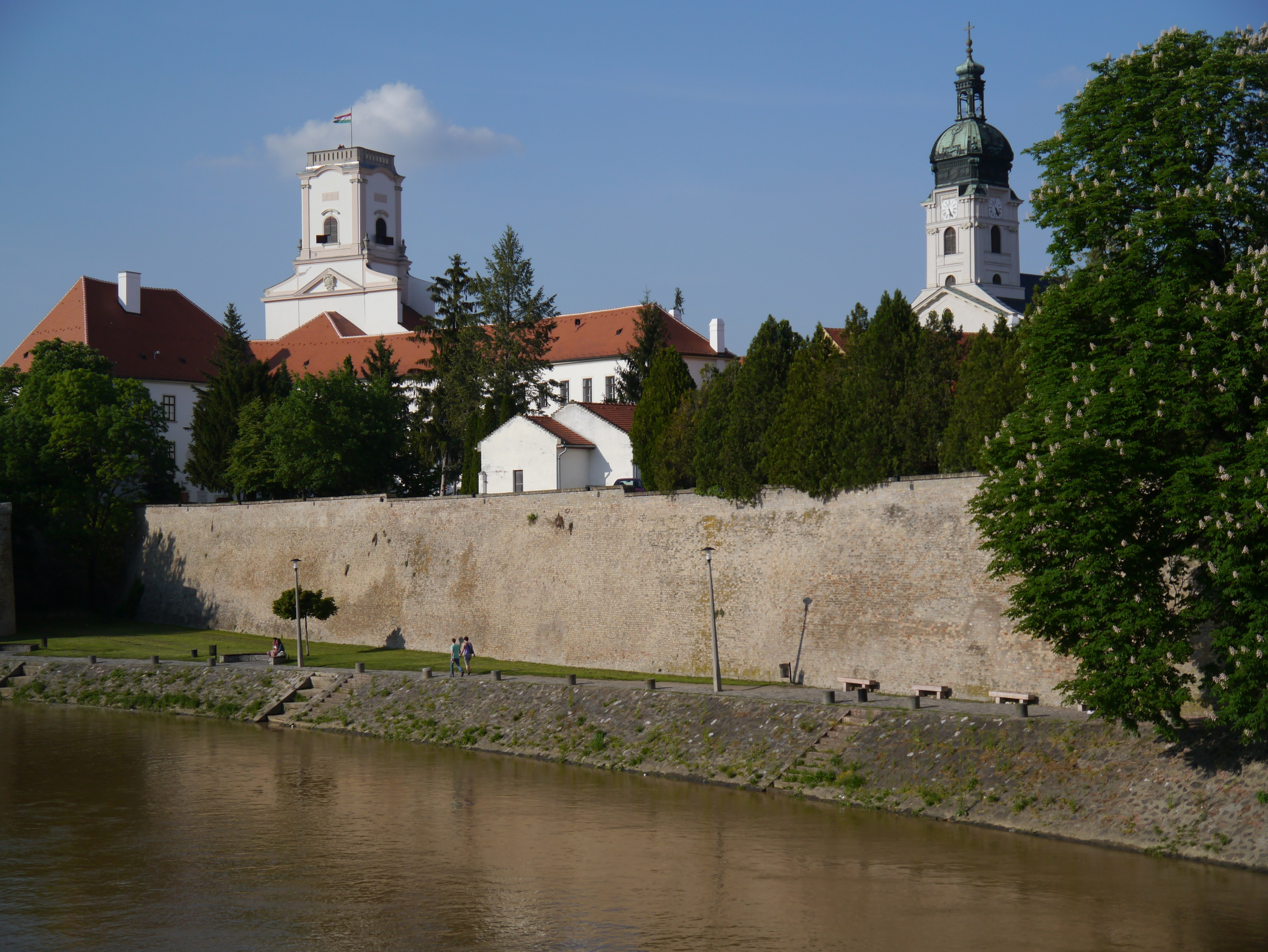
Rába at Győr

After the year 2000 the city started many big construction and renovation projects.

The bigger changes include:

- The Nádor-underpass, which relieved the Downtown's traffic infrastructure, and made the renovation of the Baross-Bridge possible.
- Renovation of the Baross-Bridge.
- Renovation of the old Soviet barracks and Bus Station by the company Leier.
- Development of the Széchenyi István University, which is in close connection with AUDI Hungária ZRT.
- Newly built Parking Houses which take off the high traffic load of the Downtown area. (e.g. József Attila and Dunakapu garage)
- Renovation of the inner-downtown district. Széchenyi-square, Dunakapu-square, the territory next to the Moson-Danube and Rába.
- Free City Bus which can be used by everyone to get anywhere in the Downtown Area.
- The Győr Arcade at Városliget.
- The Kálóczy Square near the Széchenyi István University.
- The Jedlik Bridge, which enabled traffic & transport between Sziget and Révfalu district.
- The Rába Quelle thermal spa

== Economy ==
Audi AG subsidiary company Audi Hungaria Zrt. has a large factory in Győr, where the Audi TT sports car, the A3 Cabriolet, A3 Limousine, and many engines (1,913,053 engines in 2007) are built. The factory opened in 1994, at first producing inline-four engines for the Audi marque. Business then grew to assembling the Audi TT Coupé and TT Roadster. Eventually, V6 and V8 engines were also included, and after the acquisition of Automobili Lamborghini S.p.A., Audi then began to build V10 engines, with complete 5.2-liter V10 engine units for both Audi and Lamborghini models (including the Gallardo LP560-4 and Huracán) fully assembled and tested at Audi Hungaria's Győr plant before being shipped to their respective final assembly facilities. Engines and major engine components—including V6 and V8 units for Porsche and Bentley, as well as cylinder block castings for Bugatti's W16 engines (with only Bugatti's W16 engines undergoing final assembly at Volkswagen's Salzgitter plant in Germany)—are also supplied to other Volkswagen Group marques, while over 90% of Audi vehicle engines are made here. By 2020, the factory has a 12 MW solar roof, producing 9.5 GWh/year.

== Politics ==
The current mayor of Győr is Bence Pintér.

The local Municipal Assembly, elected at the 2024 local government elections, is made up of 23 members (1 Mayor, 16 Individual constituencies MEPs and 6 Compensation List MEPs) divided into this political parties and alliances:

Party	Seats	Current Municipal Assembly
Fidesz-KDNP	16	M
Opposition coalition (Note: Coalition of DK-Momentum-MSZP-Jobbik-LMP.)	4	
Civilians for Győr	2	
Association for Győr	1	

=== List of mayors ===
List of City Mayors from 1990:

Member	Party	Term of office
Ernő Kolozsváry	SZDSZ	1990–1994
József Balogh	MSZP	1994–2006
Zsolt Borkai	Fidesz	2006–2019
Zsolt Borkai	Independent	2006–2019
Csaba András Dézsi	Fidesz	2020–2024
Bence Pintér	Independent	2024–

== Notable people ==
- Tamás Bakócz, archbishop
- Miklós Borsos, sculptor
- György Cseszneky, count, castellan
- János Cseszneky, count, infantry commander
- Josef Dobrovský (1753–1829) philologist and historian
- Freddie
- Erzsébet Galgóczi, writer
- Anita Görbicz, handball player
- Izidor Guzmics
- Stanley Jaki
- Ányos Jedlik (1800–1895), inventor, engineer, physicist and priest
- Andrew Karpati Kennedy, author and literary critic
- Tamás Kiss, footballer
- Gyula Kőnig (1849–1913), mathematician
- Margit Kovács (1902–1977), ceramist and sculptor
- Levente Losonczy, racing driver
- Raimondo Montecuccoli
- Árpád Orbán (1938–2008), footballer
- Desiderius Orban, painter, one of The Eight; emigrated to Australia in 1939
- Zsolt Palotai (1961–2023), electronic music DJ
- Antal Pusztai
- Zsófia Rácz, footballer
- Alexander Raab, pianist
- George Radda (1936–2024) chemist
- Hans Richter, conductor
- Frigyes Riesz (1880–1956), mathematician
- Marcel Riesz (1886–1969), mathematician
- Samuel Aba, king of Hungary
- József Szlávy, prime minister of Hungary
- Miklós Takács de Saár, silviculturist, politician
- Tibor Varga
- Ibolya Verebics, soprano
- Paul von Werner, Prussian Lieutenant General
- Emil Zuckerkandl (1849–1910), anatomist
- Máté Balogh, composer

== Transport ==
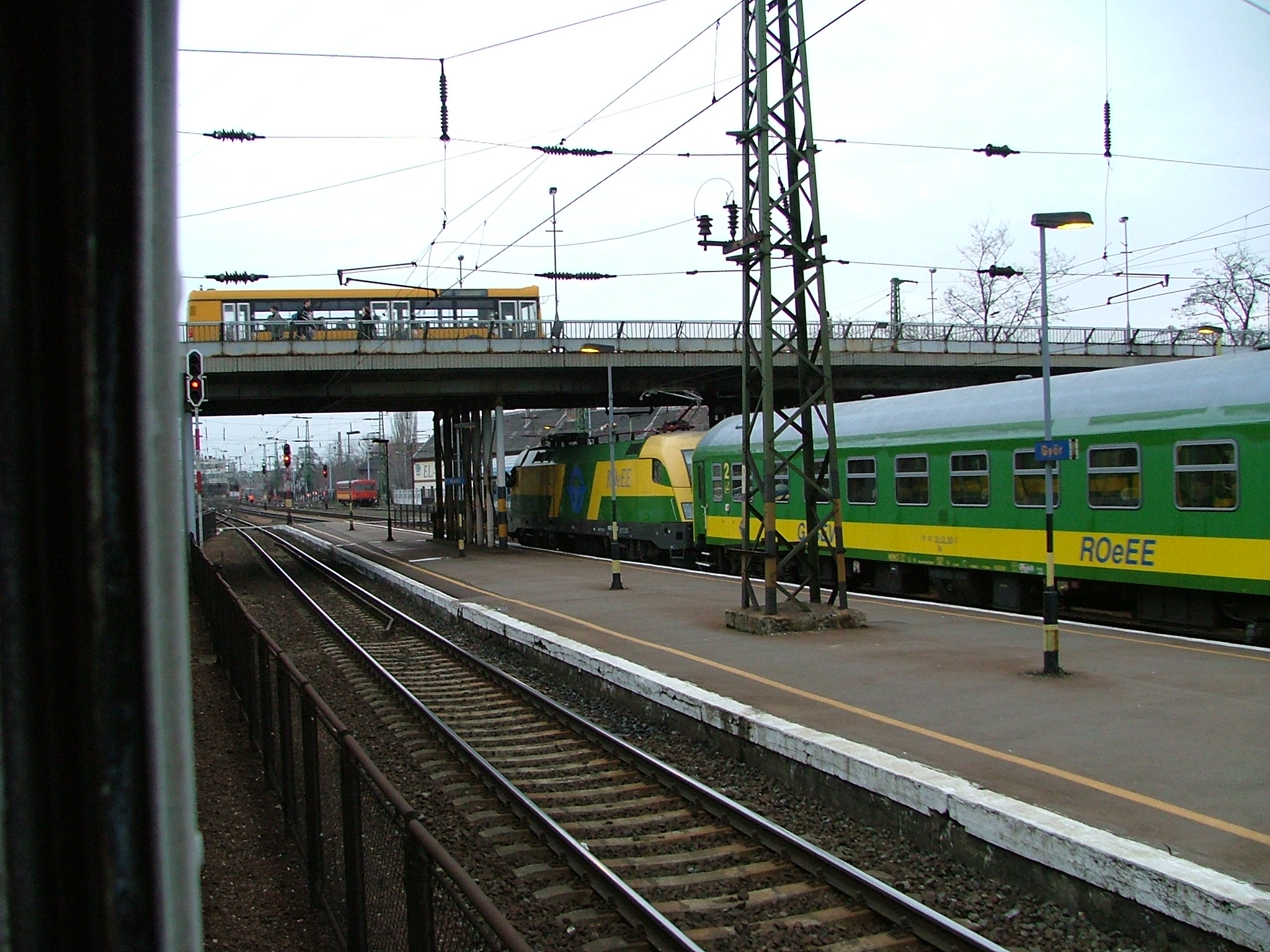
Győr station under the Baross Bridge in 2008

The city is a national hub for rail and road traffic. The transport-geographical position of Győr is excellent.

Győr railway station has important railway connections via the Eastern Railway and Budapest–Hegyeshalom lines (Vienna–Budapest, operated by Railjet), but the Győr-Sopron railway line owned by the Győr-Sopron-Ebenfurt railway company (GYSEV), as well as the Győr-Celldömölk railway line and the Győr-Veszprém railway run by MÁV

In Győr, several main transport routes meet each other (M1, M19, 1, 14, 81, 82, 83, 85), and the motorway is accessible from several parts of the city. Győr-Pér Airport can be reached from the city on Highway 81, 15 kilometers towards Székesfehérvár. At the 1,734 km (1,077 mi) section of the Danube lies the port of Győr-Gönyű with its fully equipped 25 hectare serving terminal. However, the airport is not currently operating any passenger flights. The nearest passenger airports are Bratislava Airport which is 90 km away and Vienna International Airport which is 117 km away from Győr. Budapest's Ferenc Liszt International Airport is also at a reasonable distance, it is located 159 km away from the city.

== Sports ==
Győr is the home of the Győri ETO Sport Club, which has many sport divisions. The most popular sport in the city is handball, with the Győri ETO KC being the city's main team. ETO won the Champions League in 2013, 2014, 2017, 2018, 2019 and in 2024 and also reached the final in 2009, 2012 and in 2016. In addition, Győr reached the final of the EHF Cup Winners' Cup in 2006 and the final of the EHF Cup in 1999, 2002, 2004 and 2005. The men's handball team, ETO-SZESE Győr FKC also plays in the first division.

WKW ETO FC Győr is a football team, currently (as of 2024/2025) in the Hungarian first division. Other notable association football team is Győri Dózsa SE.

== Twin towns – sister cities ==
Győr is twinned with:

- Brașov, Romania
- Colmar, France
- Erfurt, Germany
- Ingolstadt, Germany
- Kuopio, Finland
- Nizhny Novgorod, Russia
- Nof HaGalil, Israel
- Poznań, Poland
- Sindelfingen, Germany
- Wuhan, China
- Dunajská Streda, Slovakia
- Bryansk, Russia
