= Győr–Celldömölk railway line =

Railway line in Hungary

Győr–Celldömölk
- Route map

Overview
- Line number: 12

Service

Technical
- Line length: 70.5 km (43.8 mi)
- Track gauge: 1,435 mm (4 ft 8 1/2 in) standard gauge
- Operating speed: 100–120 kilometres per hour (62–75 mph)

Győr–Celldömölk railway line is the MÁV line number 10. It is a single track, non-electrified route. The line from Győr to Celldömölk is 70.5 kilometres (43.8 mi) long. Electrification has been proposed.

== Route ==
The Győr–Celldömölk railway line runs north–south between Győr and Celldömölk. The northern end terminates in a connection with the Budapest–Hegyeshalom railway line east of the Győr railway station. In Pápa, the line connects with the Pápa–Csorna and Tatabánya–Pápa railway lines. In Celldömölk, the line connects with the Székesfehérvár–Szombathely railway line. The electrification of the line has been proposed.

== History ==
In March 1867 the Hungarian Minister of Public Works and Transport, Imre Mikó, proposed the construction of a railway network in Hungary, and a railway line between Győr and Graz was included among the 25 railway lines. In the act of 20 May 1869, it was agreed where the Hungarian Western Railway (Hungarian: Magyar Nyugati Vasút, MNyV) should connect the railway between Austria and Hungary. The section between Győr and Szombathely, via Celldömölk, was opened on 1 October 1871.

In 1888 the governments of Hungary and Austria agreed to nationalise the MNyV. On 1 January 1889, the Győr–Celldömölk line was taken over by the Hungarian State Railways, as sell as the other lines of the Hungarian section.

== Operation ==
InterRegio trains operate every two hours between Győr and Kaposvár, Pécs, or Balatonszentgyörgy. Regional trains (Személyvonat) operate every two hours between Győr and Celldömölk.
