= János Cseszneky =

Count János Cseszneky de Milvány et Csesznek (ca. 1535-1593) was a Hungarian magnate, member of the Cseszneky family.

János Cseszneky was mentioned as one of the neighbour nobles in a charter that installed Palatine Tamás Nádasdy and Orsolya Kanizsai into the estate of Kapuvár in 1558. On 13 October 1582 the assembly of Győr county elected him to be inspector for the construction of the watch fortress in Mérges. Cseszneky fortified not only the castle of Mérges, since he was the commander of the Hungarian foot-soldiers in Győr, did so with the stronghold of Győr as well. In 1588 he was the representative of István Fejérkövy, Viceroy of the Kingdom, in Fejér county. His braveness was known throughout the country, and the Ottomans were not able to occupy the castle of Győr, but only in 1594, one year after his death.

== Sources ==
- Győr vármegye nemesi közgyűléseinek regesztái
- A Cseszneky család
