= Győr railway station =

Railway station in Győr, Hungary

Győr
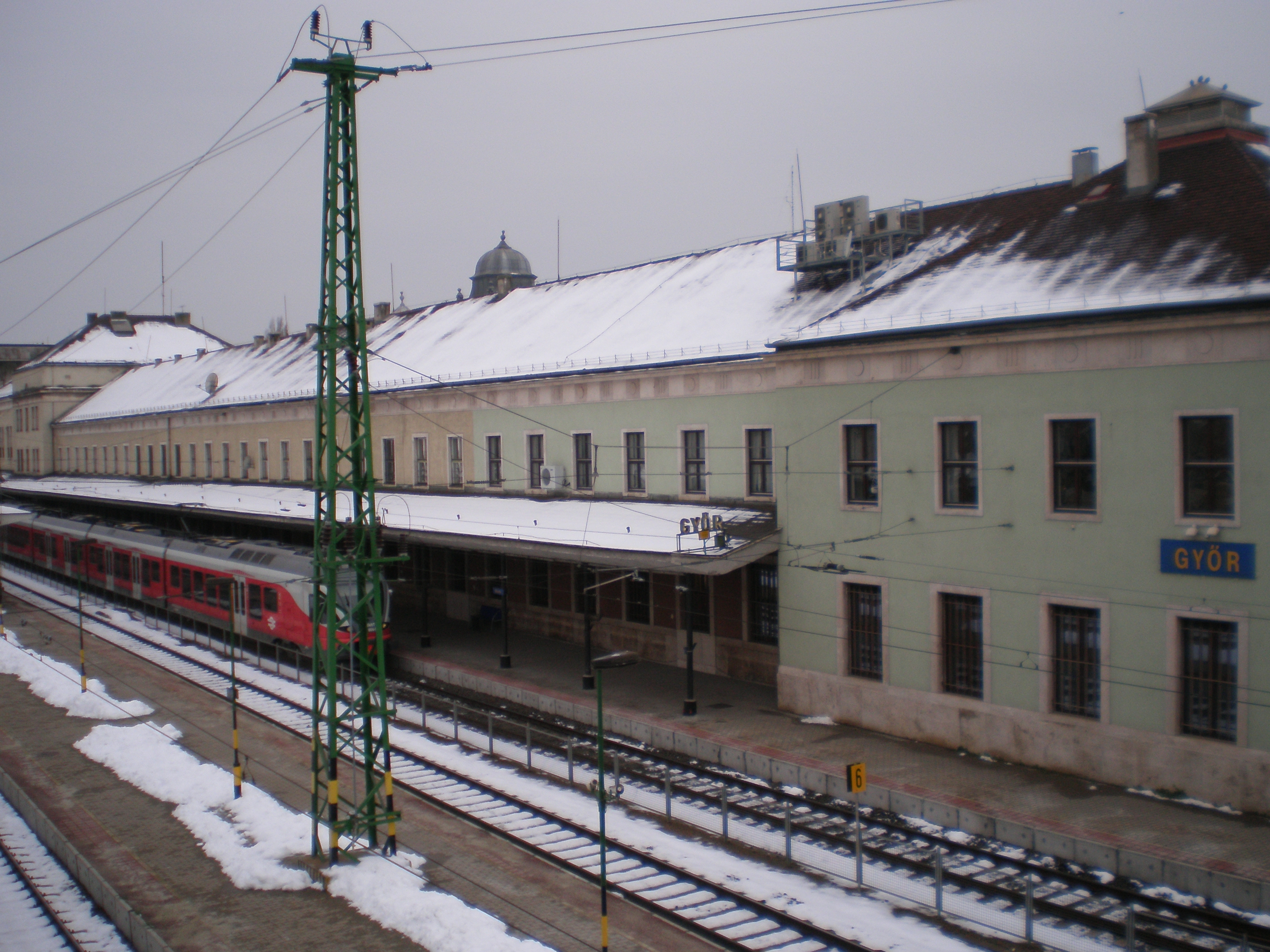
- Győr railway station

General information
- Location: Győr; Hungary
- Coordinates: 47°40′55″N 17°38′06″E
- Owner: Hungarian State Railways (MÁV)
- Lines: Line 1 Budapest–Hegyeshalom railway; Line 8 Győr–Sopron railway; Line 10 Győr–Celldömölk railway; Line 11 Győr–Veszprém railway
- Platforms: 1 side platform; 3 island platforms
- Tracks: 7

History
- Opened: 24 December 1855

Services
Preceding station	ÖBB	Following station
Mosonmagyaróvár towards München Hbf	Railjet Express	Tatabánya towards Budapest Keleti
Mosonmagyaróvár towards Zürich HB	Railjet Express	Tatabánya towards Budapest Keleti
Abda towards Bruck an der Leitha	REX 62	Terminus
Preceding station	MÁV START	Following station
Mosonmagyaróvár towards Wien Hbf	EuroCity	Tatabánya towards Budapest Keleti
Mosonmagyaróvár towards Wien Hbf	EuroCity	Tatabánya towards Cluj Napoca
Csorna towards Ljubljana	InterCity	Komárom towards Budapest Keleti
Csorna towards Graz Hbf	InterCity	Komárom towards Budapest Keleti
Csorna towards Szentgotthárd	InterCity	Komárom towards Budapest Keleti
Csorna towards Sopron	InterCity	Komárom towards Budapest Keleti
Mosonmagyaróvár towards Salzburg Hbf, Stuttgart Hbf or Zürich HB	EuroNight Kálmán Imre	Tatabánya towards Budapest Keleti
Mosonmagyaróvár towards Wien Hbf	Dacia–Corvin Express	Tatabánya towards Bucharest North
Győr-Gyárváros towards Kaposvar	InterRegio	Terminus
Győr-Gyárváros towards Celldömölk	Személyvonat	Terminus
Abda towards Rajka	Személyvonat	Terminus
Ikreny towards Sopron	Személyvonat	Terminus
Terminus	Személyvonat	Terminus
Terminus	S10	Győr-Gyárváros towards Budapest Déli
Location
- Location within Hungary

Győr railway station (Hungarian: Győr vasútállomás) is the main railway station in Győr, Győr-Moson-Sopron County, Hungary. The station opened on 24 December 1855. The station is located on the main line between Vienna and Budapest (Line 1 Budapest–Hegyeshalom railway) and Line 8 Győr–Sopron railway, Line 10 Győr–Celldömölk railway and Line 11 Győr–Veszprém railway. The train services are operated by MÁV START.

== Station layout ==
Győr has one island platform and three side platforms serving seven tracks. Connecting buses stop north and south of the station.

== Services ==
As of the June 2023 timetable change, the following services stop at Győr:

- Railjet: services between Zürich HB, München, and Budapest Keleti.
- EuroCity: services between Wien, Budapest Keleti, and Cluj Napoca.
- InterCity: hourly service to and from Budapest Keleti; trains continue to Graz, Ljubljana, Sopron, Szentgotthárd, or Szombathely.
- Overnight trains:
  - Dacia–Corvin Express: service between Wien and Bucharest North.
  - Kálmán Imre: service between Budapest Keleti and Salzburg, Stuttgart, or Zürich.
- InterRegio: service every two hours to Kaposvar.
- Regional-Express: service every two hours to Bruck an der Leitha.
- Személyvonat: service every hour to Sopron and two hours to Celldömölk, Rajka, and Veszprem.
- S10: service every hour to Budapest Déli.
