= Zsolt Palotai =

Hungarian electronic music DJ (1961–2023)

- Also known as: DJ Palotai
- Born: 28 May 1961; Győr, Hungary
- Died: 18 November 2023 (aged 62)
- Genres: Electronic music
- Occupations: DJ, cultural activist
- Years active: 1989–2023
- Formerly of: Tilos Radio

Zsolt Palotai (also known as DJ Palotai; 28 May 1961 – 18 November 2023) was a Hungarian electronic music DJ and cultural activist. He was one of the founders of the independent radio station Tilos Radio, playing all kinds of music.

== Biography ==
Zsolt Palotai was the son of Hungarian footballer Karoly Palotai. As a child, he attended a primary music school, practicing daily. His father's work and frequent travels, as well as the closeness of the Austrian border to his home town, allowed him to experience music that was different from what was generally available in his home country. This influenced him heavily to the point that he devoted his life to music. He played his first gig as a DJ in 1989.

In the late 1980s and the early 1990s, he was an important figure in the emergence of Budapest's cultural meeting point called Tilos az Á. This was the place where the pirate radio station Tilos Radio was born.

He used to have regular shows on the air.

He died on 18 November 2023 following a heart attack. Palotai was posthumously awarded Budapest's Pro Cultura Urbis medal in recognition of his contributions to culture. Parties celebrating his work were held after his death.
