= Tilos Rádió =

Hungary
- Broadcast area: Budapest, Hungary
- Frequency: 90.3 MHz

Programming
- Languages: Hungarian, English etc.
- Format: Community radio

Ownership
- Owner: Tilos Kulturális Alapítvány

History
- First air date: August 21, 1991
- Former frequencies: 95.5 MHz (1991–1993); 98.0 MHz (1995–2000); 88.8 MHz (temporary, 2000); 92.1 MHz (temporary, 2001, 2002)

Technical information
- Power: 500 watts

Links
- Webcast: mp3 live stream 256 kbps, mp3 live stream 128 kbps, mp3 live stream 32 kbps,
- Website: tilos.hu

Tilos Rádió is a community, non-profit, listener supported radio station in Budapest, Hungary.

== History ==
Tilos Rádió was the first community radio station in Hungary, established as a pirate broadcaster in 1991. The station's programmers have always contributed on a voluntary basis. Tilos Rádió has never broadcast advertisements, and has a strong social and freedom-of-expression commitment. Zsolt Palotai was one of the founders.

Tilos Rádió was established as a pirate community radio station in Budapest in 1991 as a way of bringing the public's attention to the fact that there was at that time no legal framework for independent and community broadcasters. During the first years of its broadcasting, Tilos (meaning "forbidden" in Hungarian) enjoyed wide public interest and played a key role in the 1995 liberalisation of the airwaves in Hungary.

Tilos Rádió obtained a legal frequency license in 1995 and became a popular local community station in Budapest with its morning phone-in talk-shows and its music programmes, broadcasting 12 hours a day. Tilos is a key player in the cultural and lifestyle scene of Budapest. Meanwhile, Tilos Rádió has its fingers on the public pulse with its social thinking, minority oriented programmes, and its radical and tolerant attitude. Tilos' broadcasts are mainly financed by listeners' donations and the income from fund-raising events, and partly by support from EU programmes, international NGOs and charity institutions.

In November 1999, Tilos Rádió had to apply for a new frequency licence. Tilos Rádió wanted to broadcast 24 hours a day. Tilos did not receive a new frequency licence – this meant that the radio had to leave its frequency in 2000.

In October 2002, almost 3 years later, with its third application, Tilos Rádió received a licence for the 90.3 MHz frequency in Budapest for seven years. Tilos Rádió can also be heard via cable and via Internet 24 hours a day. The license was renewed in 2008 and in 2015.

The radio temporarily stopped broadcasting on September 3, 2022, on the expiration of its license. The radio already submitted a new broadcast application to National Media and Infocommunications Authority as a lone applicant. The application covers the usage of the regional 90.3 MHz frequency for additional 10 years. The radio won the license and broadcasting resumed on October 22, 2022.

== Controversies ==
=== Ice-T gate ===
In 2011 Hungary's then-new media authority, National Media and Infocommunications Authority has begun investigating Tilos Rádió for playing a song by rapper Ice-T which it said "could influence the development of minors in a negative way" on 2 September 2010 (at 5.51pm). The media authority said the song should only have been broadcast after 9pm.

Tilos Rádió argues that since the lyrics are in English and the knowledge of foreign languages among the Hungarian population is far below EU average, furthermore the station has very few young listeners, so the song could not have an "adverse affect [sic] on the moral development" of children under 16.

Hungarian authorities said their investigation is based on a 1996 law regulating radio and television. Tilos Rádió points out that "up till this point, for over a decade, it hasn’t occurred that the authority would investigate and disapprove of the lyrics of a non-Hungarian song".

== Archived broadcasts ==
The station is one of the most archived radio stations in the world, with the past 11 years (since 2010.04.01) recorded and uploaded to their online archive 24/7.
