= Budapest–Hegyeshalom railway line =

Railway line in Hungary

Budapest–Hegyeshalom
- The Budapest–Hegyeshalom railway line is indicated in red. This map includes the connecting line from Hegyeshalom to Rajka, on the Slovak frontier.

Overview
- Owner: Hungarian State Railways
- Line number: 1
- Termini: Budapest Keleti; Hegyeshalom

Technical
- Line length: 185.1 km (115.0 mi)
- Number of tracks: 2
- Track gauge: 1,435 mm (4 ft 8 1/2 in) standard gauge
- Electrification: 25 kV 50 Hz AC

The Budapest–Hegyeshalom railway line is a major east–west railway line in Hungary. It runs 185.1 kilometres (115.0 mi) from Budapest Keleti station, one of the three principal terminals in Budapest, to Hegyeshalom, near the frontier with Austria. The line is double-tracked, electrified, and carries significant domestic and international traffic. Hungarian State Railways owns and operates the line.

== Route ==
The Budapest–Hegyeshalom railway line originates at Budapest Keleti station, one of the three principal passenger terminals in Budapest. From there, the line makes a clockwise circle, crossing the Danube at Ferencváros and connecting with the Budapest–Székesfehérvár railway line at Budapest-Kelenföld. Major junctions along the line include Tatabánya, Komárom and Győr. At Hegyeshalom, the line connects with the Eastern Railway, which continues into Austria. A branch line, the Bratislava–Hegyeshalom railway line, turns north to serve Bratislava via Rajka.

== Operation ==
The Budapest–Hegyeshalom railway line carries a significant number of domestic and international trains. Railjet and EuroCity trains operating via Budapest Keleti serve München Hauptbahnhof, Zürich Hauptbahnhof, Wien Hauptbahnhof, Chop, and Cluj Napoca. InterCity trains run regularly between Tatabánya and Csorna or Sopron. The S10 and S12 of the suburban network in Budapest originate from Budapest Déli station and provide local service over the line between Budapest-Kelenföld and Győr.
