= Eastern Railway (Austria) =

Railway line in Austria

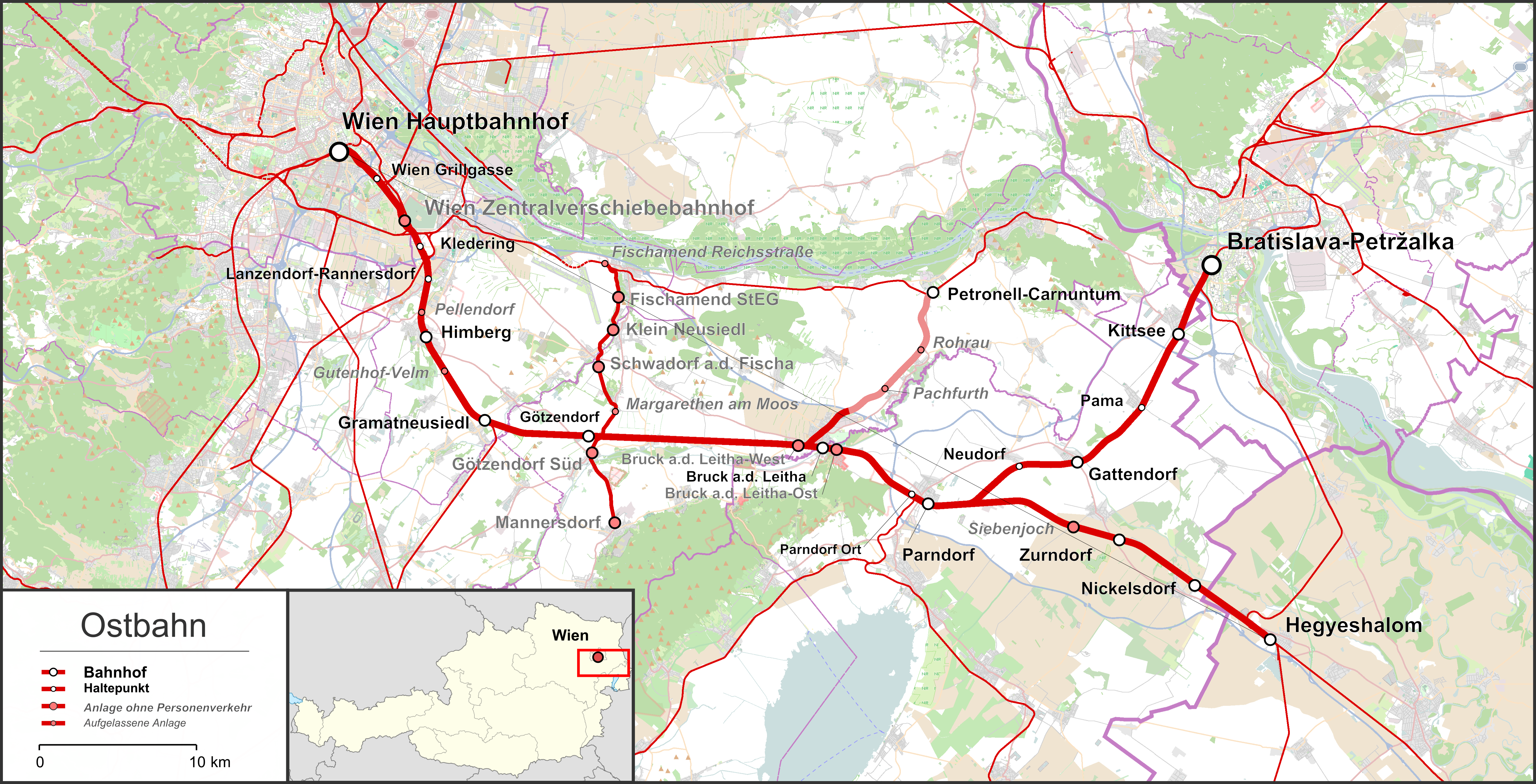

Overview
- Line number: 118 01

Technical
- Line length: 67.4 km (41.9 mi)
- Track gauge: 1,435 mm (4 ft 8 1/2 in) standard gauge
- Electrification: 15 kV 16.7 Hz AC

The Eastern Railway (German: Ostbahn), formerly also known as the Vienna-Győr railway (German: Wien-Raaber Bahn), is a two-track, electrified railway line that runs from Vienna towards Hungary. The name Eastern Railway refers to several branches of the line as well. The previous western terminus of the railway line in Vienna, Wien Südbahnhof, has been replaced by the new Hauptbahnhof, which allows for continuous east-west traffic and connects the Eastern Railway directly to the Western Railway and Southern Railway.

== Route ==
The Eastern Railway originates east of Wien Hauptbahnhof. It runs parallel to the Laaer Ostbahn for several kilometers before that line veers off to the east. There are several major railway yards in the vicinity of the Vienna Central Cemetery. The line continues south to Gramatneusiedl, at which point it turns east for the run to the Hungarian border. The line is electrified at 15 kV 16.7 Hz AC between Vienna and Hegyeshalom.

== Operation ==
As of the December 2022 timetable change, the S60 of the Vienna S-Bahn provides frequent service between Wien Hauptbahnhof and Bruck an der Leitha. This is supplemented by Regional-Express services that operate between Vienna and Fertőszentmiklós, Bratislava-Petržalka, and Hegyeshalom. Long-distance Railjet and EuroCity services bound for Budapest and other destinations also use the route.
