= Railjet =

European high-speed rail service operated by ÖBB and ČD

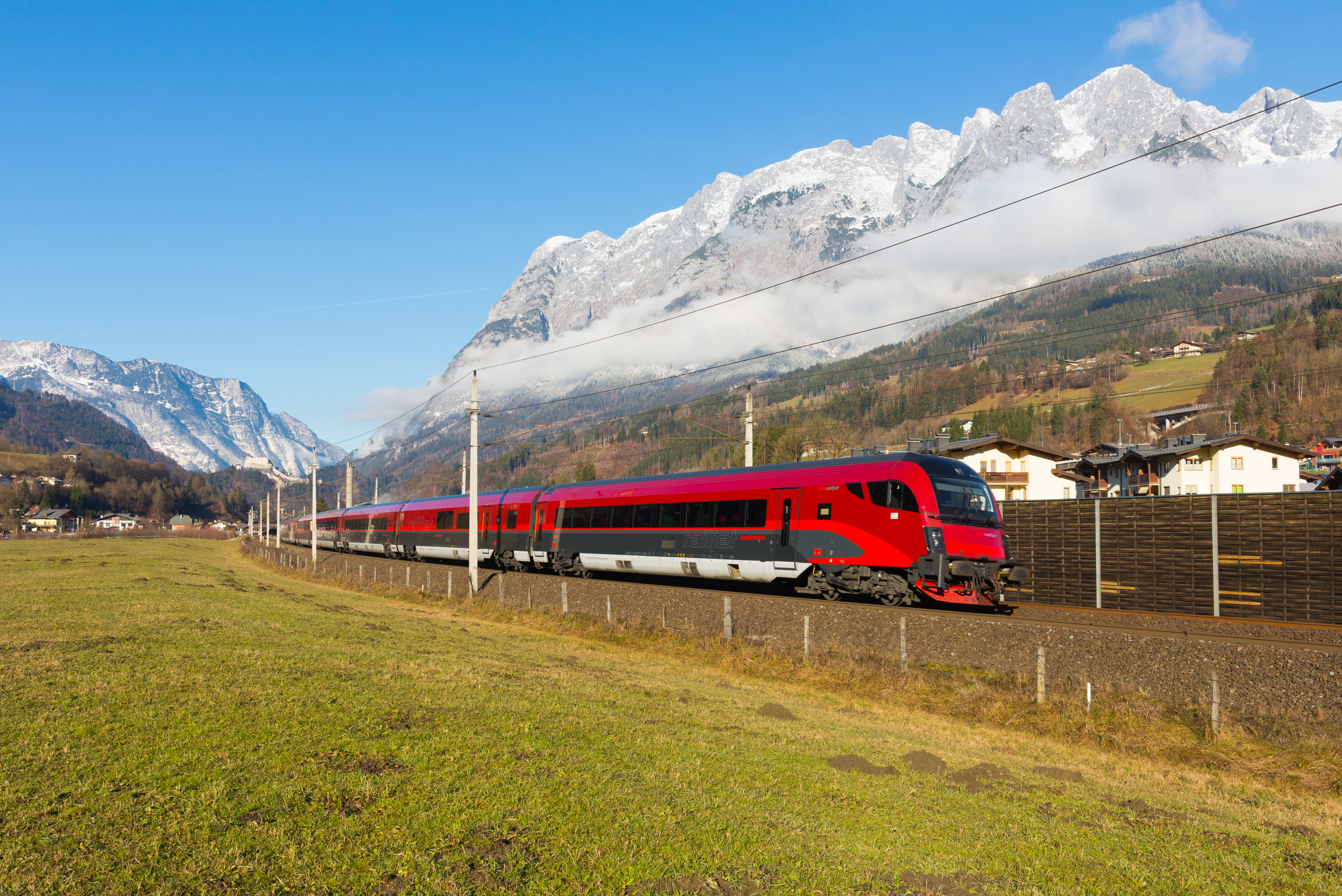
- ÖBB Railjet train near Pfarrwerfen on Salzburg-Tyrol Railway

Overview
- Service type: Inter-city high-speed rail
- Status: Operating
- Locale: Austria; Czech Republic; Denmark; Germany; Hungary; Italy; Slovakia; Switzerland
- First service: 2008
- Current operators: ÖBB; ČD
- Website: Official website

On-board services
- Classes: First, Business, Economy

Technical
- Rolling stock: Siemens Viaggio Comfort, Siemens Viaggio Next Level, pulled by EuroSprinter or Siemens Vectron
- Track gauge: 1,435 mm (4 ft 8 1/2 in)
- Operating speed: 230 km/h (145 mph)

Railjet is a high-speed rail service in Europe operated by ÖBB and ČD. Branded as Railjet Express (RJX category) for the fastest services and as Railjet (RJ) for services with additional stops, it was introduced in 2008 and operates at speeds of up to 230 km/h (143 mph). Railjet is ÖBB's premier service and operates both domestically within Austria and on international services to adjacent major cities in the Czech Republic, Denmark, Germany, Hungary, Italy, Slovakia, and Switzerland.

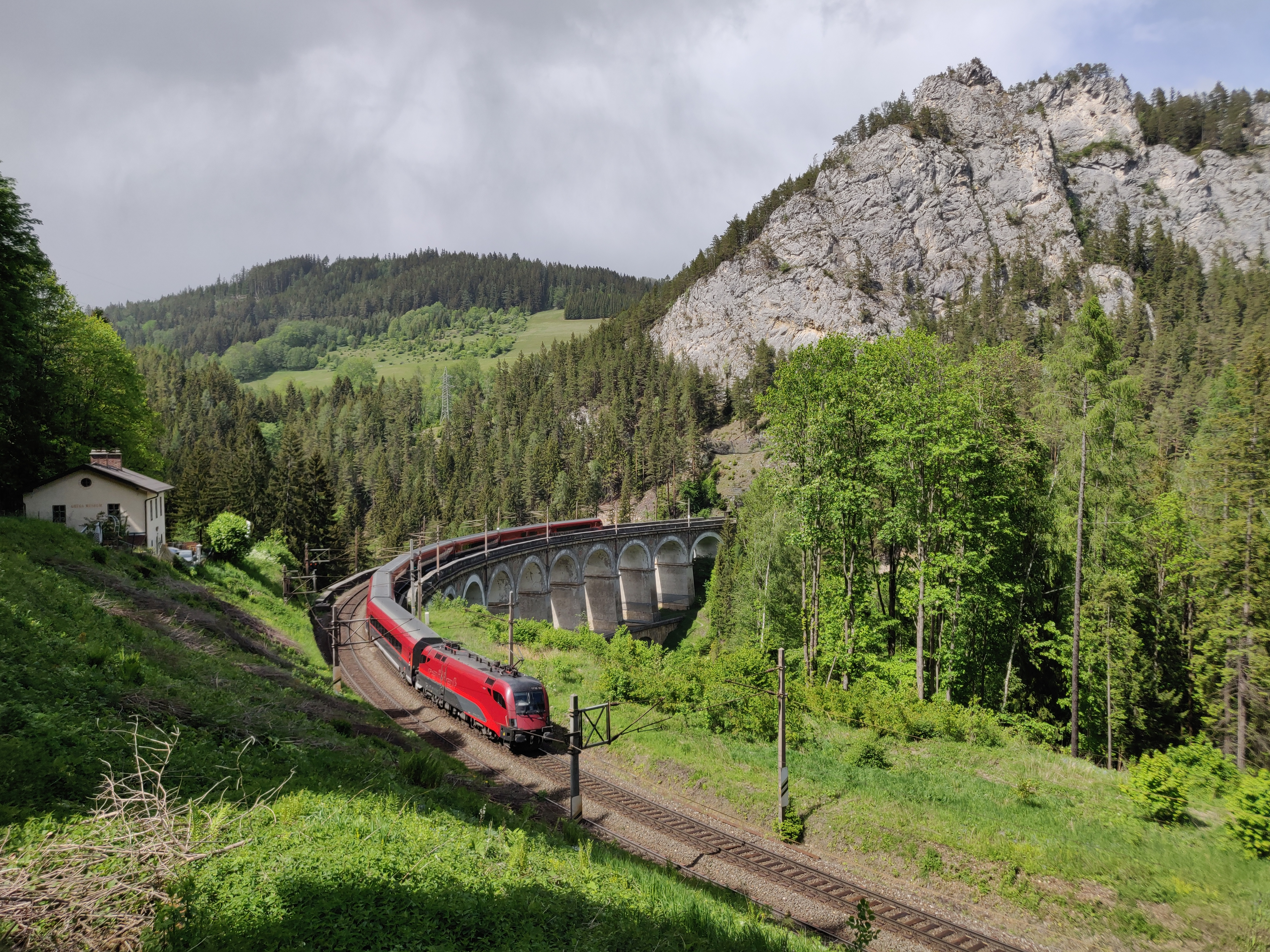
ÖBB Railjet passing over the Kalte Rinne viaduct on the Semmering railway

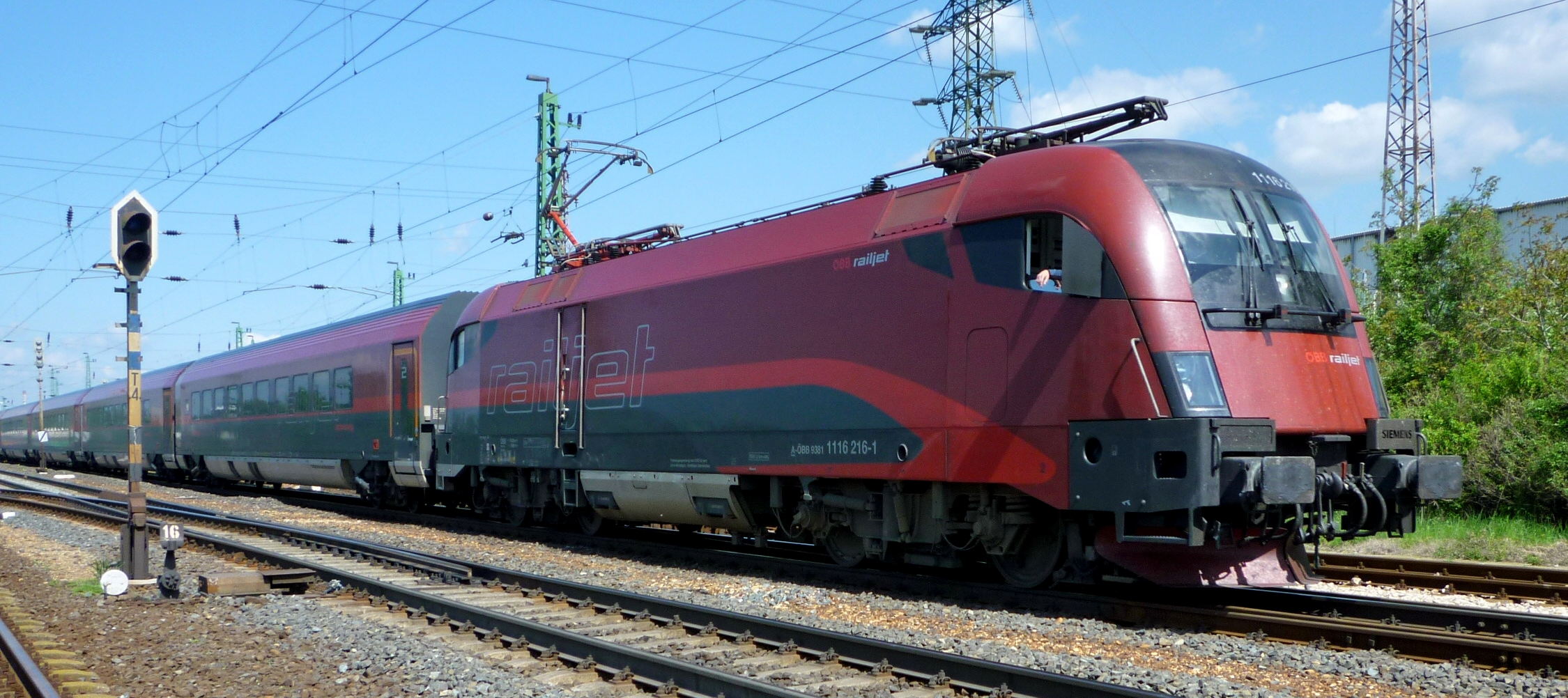
ÖBB Railjet at Mosonmagyaróvár station

== History ==
Rather than choosing electric multiple units (EMUs) such as Deutsche Bahn's ICE 3, ÖBB opted for locomotive-hauled push-pull high-speed trains, which could be hauled by its existing fleet of Taurus high-speed Siemens EuroSprinter electric locomotives. (Note: Classes 1016, 1116 and 1216 of Eurosprinter type ES 64 U, however Railjet service will only be carried out by the multisystem version locomotive classes 1116 and 1216) On 9 February 2006, nine months after receiving sealed bids, ÖBB awarded Siemens Mobility a contract to build 23 seven-coach trains, with the Siemens design viewed to be the best as well as the least expensive. In September 2007 Siemens received an additional order for 44 more Railjet trains. The total value of the order was €798 million for 469 passenger carriages.

The first unit was unveiled on 15 September 2008, and put on display at Graz, then Innotrans in late September and then at Salzburger Verkehrstage on 15 October. The first railjet trains began test runs in late 2008.

In September 2011 Siemens agreed the sale of 16 Railjet trainsets to ČD; the sets should have been originally built for an uncompleted order for ÖBB, ČD's trainsets were to be hauled by Škoda ČD Class 380 electric locomotives. In 2012 Czech Railways cancelled the order. A reduced order of seven Viaggio Comfort trainsets was agreed in August 2012.

In June 2014 ÖBB took up an option for a remaining nine railjets from Siemens, planned to be used on the Westbahn route between Vienna and Salzburg and will also be equipped to operate in Italy.

== Trainsets ==
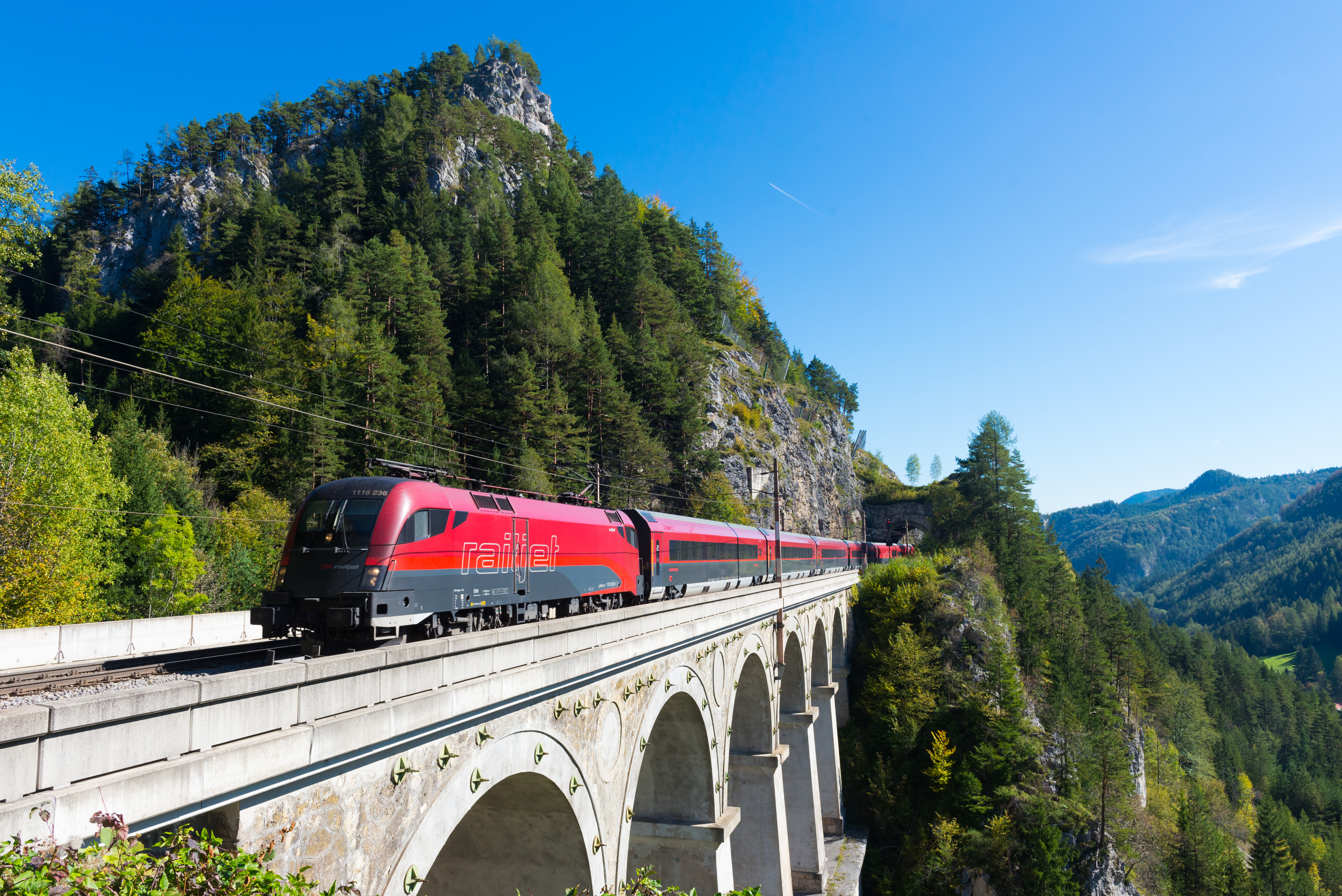
ÖBB Railjet passing over the Krauselklause viaduct on the Semmering railway

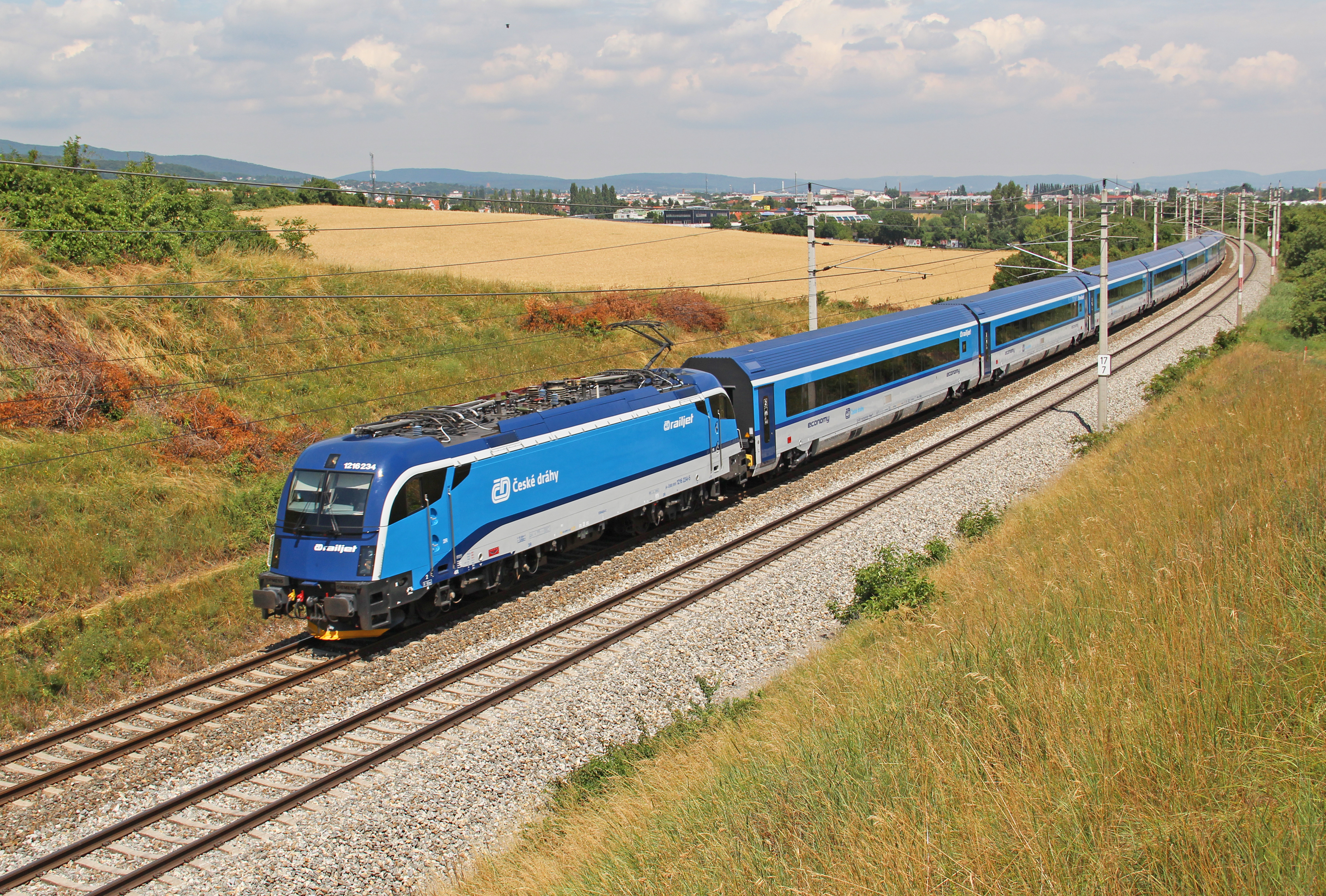
ČD Railjet on its way to Vienna

A Railjet train set consists of seven or nine individual coaches that are permanently coupled with airtight interconnections, but with buffer and hook couplings on the outer ends of the set of coaches suitable for buffer and chain screw coupling Two complete train sets with two locomotives can be run as a pair giving a train of fourteen carriages. The coach furthest from the locomotive acts as a control car. The number of carriages per train can be extended up to ten in a single train unit.

The ÖBB Railjet's coach that is the furthest from the locomotive, the cab car, is half Business Class and half First Class. The next coach is First Class only, followed by a coach that is half First Class and the other half is the in-train restaurant. The rest of the coaches are Economy only coaches.

ČD's Railjet has replaced one First Class coach for one Economy class coach, therefore its coach order is slightly different: The coach that is the furthest from the locomotive is half Business Class and half First Class, and the next coach is half First Class and half the in-train restaurant. The rest of the coaches are Economy Class, so the ČD Railjet has one less First Class coach and one more Economy class coach.

The industrial design company Spirit Design was contracted to provide an exterior and interior design, three colour schemes were presented and the livery to be used was decided by poll conducted by the Austrian tabloid Kronen Zeitung. In 2009 the railjet design was given a Red Dot award.

=== Traction ===
The Railjet vehicles are designed to be propelled in push-pull mode by standard electric locomotives, specifically the Siemens ES64U2 and ES64U4 (ÖBB Class 1116 and 1216 Taurus) already owned by the Austrian Federal Railways, but can also be hauled by any other electric locomotives such as the ÖBB Class 1293 Vectron , or diesel locomotives.

The first 23 ÖBB Class 1116 locomotives used in Railjet service were given a number of modifications: a third pantograph and the relevant train safety systems for operating outside Austria (Hungary, Switzerland and the Czech Republic) and a silver-colored side skirt below the floor level, giving a more streamlined appearance. A second set of 20 locomotives were equipped only for work in Austria and Germany and did not receive the side panels or extra systems for international working.

=== Carriages ===
The bodies of the vehicles are constructed from ribbed, cold-rolled steel, with the driving trailer deriving its forward end shape from the Taurus locomotives.

The passenger cars are equipped with electropneumatic disc brakes (3 per axle in SF400 bogies), as well as electromagnetic track brakes (eddy current brakes), and a parking brake. The driving trailer also has a manually operated brake using the disc brakes. Primary bogie suspension is by coil spring, and secondary suspension is pneumatic. In compliance with the UIC classification of railway coaches the driving trailers (control cars) are designated 'Afmpz', the premium and business class vehicle 'Ampz', the 'bistro' or restaurant car 'ARbmpz' and the economy class cars 'Bmpz'.

The intermediate passenger wagon bodyshells of the first units were manufactured by Siemens in Maribor, Slovenia. Final assembly takes place at the rail works at Simmering, Vienna; the first three trains were assembled by Siemens, the remainder by ÖBB technical services. (Note: Rail vehicle assembly, maintenance, modernisation and repair company, as of 2010 owned by ÖBB and Rail Cargo Austria.) The driving trailers are manufactured by ÖBB Infrastruktur Bau (Note: Since 2009 named ÖBB Infrastruktur AG) under subcontract to Siemens.

Siemens is the main contractor for the vehicles and markets the coach design as Viaggio Comfort. Brake equipment is supplied by Knorr-Bremse, air-conditioning by Liebherr, and doors, carriage connections, toilets and seats are manufactured by other subcontractors.

== Routes ==
=== Current network ===
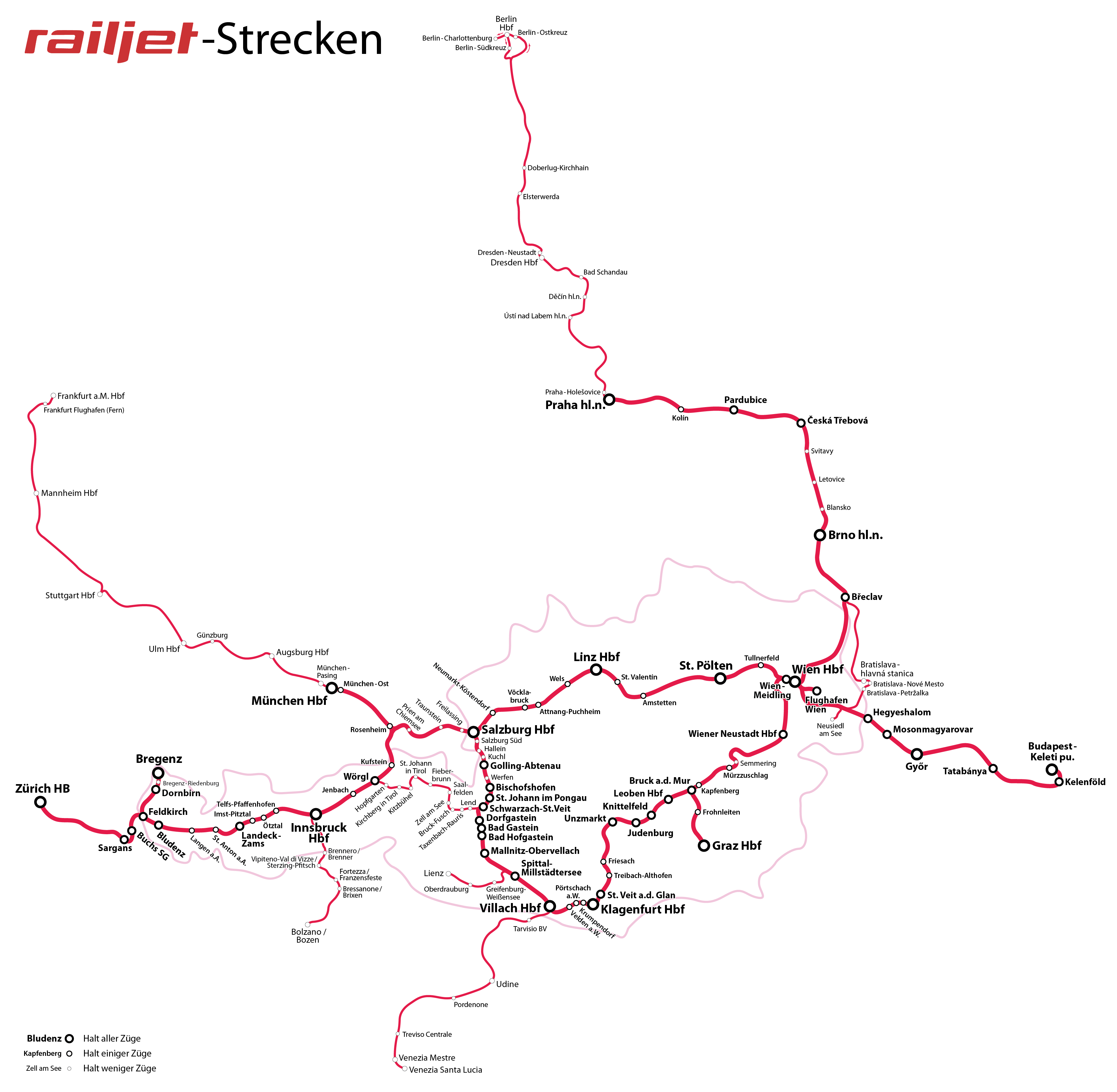
Railjet routes as of June 2020

As of 2025, Railjets of ÖBB and ČD serve the following route network. Not all stops are shown, route sections only served by some trains are shown in brackets:

- (Vienna Airport -) Wien Hbf - Linz Hbf - Salzburg Hbf - Innsbruck Hbf (- Feldkirch or Bregenz or - Bolzano/Bozen)
- Vienna International Airport - Wien Hbf - Linz Hbf - Salzburg Hbf - Innsbruck Hbf - Bregenz - Lindau - Friedrichshafen - Ulm - Stuttgart - Frankfurt
- (Budapest or ViennaAirport or Bratislava -) Wien Hbf - Linz Hbf - Salzburg Hbf - Innsbruck Hbf - Zürich
- (Budapest or Vienna Airport -) Wien Hbf - Linz Hbf - Salzburg Hbf - München Hbf
- Budapest - Tatabánya - Győr - Wien Hbf (- Salzburg Hbf)
- Praha hlavní nádraží - Brno hlavní nádraží - Wien Hbf
- (Berlin Hbf - Dresden Hbf -) Praha hlavní nádraží - Brno hlavní nádraží - Wien Hbf - Graz Hbf
- (Copenhagen or Kiel Hbf -) Hamburg Hbf - Berlin Hbf - Dresden Hbf - Praha hlavní nádraží
- Vienna International Airport - Wien Hbf - Graz Hbf
- Wien Hbf - Klagenfurt Hbf - Villach Hbf (- Spittal-Millstättersee or Udine - Venice)
- Graz Hbf - Klagenfurt Hbf - Villach Hbf - Spittal-Millstättersee
- München Hbf - Wörgl Hbf - Innsbruck Hbf - Bolzano/Bozen - Verona Porta Nuova (- Bologna Centrale or Ancona or Padova - Venice)

Some services are served by two joint trainsets which might be coupled and separated on their way. For example, a trainset incoming from Budapest is coupled with another incoming from Vienna International Airport at Vienna main station. They travel together until Salzburg (providing more passenger capacity on the Vienna - Salzburg core route), where one is separated and continues to Munich, while the other heads to Innsbruck.

All Railjets from and to Innsbruck, Bregenz and Zürich use the Deutsches Eck (German corner) transit route through Bavaria without stopping as this is the fastest route between Salzburg and western Tyrol due to the topography of the Austrian Alps. The Deutsches Eck provides a dedicated rail bypass near Rosenheim for this purpose.

From December 2018 faster Railjet trains were denominated as Railjet Express (RJX) between Salzburg and Vienna stopping only in Linz and Sankt Pölten in order to distinguish them from those with the additional stops in Vöcklabruck, Attnang-Puchheim, Wels, Sankt Valentin, Amstetten and Tullnerfeld.

=== Development ===
Commercial services started on 14 December 2008 between Munich, Vienna and Budapest, gradually replacing the former EuroCity connection until September 2009. In December 2009 new services started between Vienna and Zürich via Innsbruck as well as between Vienna and Bregenz. Those services to Bregenz/Zürich via Salzburg and Innsbruck were increased by the end of 2010. Following the completion of the track improvement works on the Westbahn in December 2012, running at speeds between 200–230 km/h (120–140 mph) the journey time between Salzburg and Vienna is now about 2hr20min and between Vienna and Innsbruck is about 4hr15min.

From 2011 to 2020 Railjet trains used to run from Budapest to Frankfurt (Main) and on the weekends to Wiesbaden (until 2017) via Vienna, Munich and Stuttgart. Those routes are now partially covered by EuroCity trains, while Deutsche Bahn also offers ICE services on similar routes.

Since October 2011, Railjet trains also run on the Southern Railway line from Vienna to Graz and Klagenfurt/Villach. From 2013 to 2017 trains also served Lienz in East Tyrol. This service has been now replaced by an InterCity train while Railjet trains serve up to Spittal an der Drau near the Millstätter See.

On 15 June 2014, České dráhy inaugurated a Railjet connection from Wiener Neustadt to Prague. Since December 2014, trains run from Graz to Prague main station (Praha hlavní nádraží) via Vienna and Brno.

Since December 2014, trains serve the new Wien Hauptbahnhof, passing Wien Meidling and the Lainz Tunnel since 2015. From Wien Hauptbahnhof trains also serve Vienna Airport.

From December 2016, newly delivered Railjet trainsets replaced further InterCity trains on existing routes within Austria. From December 2017, the existing Vienna-Villach route was extended to Venezia Santa Lucia via Udine. This is the first Railjet connection to a coastal region.

Since 9 December 2018 a Railjet Express train connects directly Zürich to Bratislava via Vienna, expanding the service to Slovakia.

Since May 2020 there is a direct Berlin-Graz connection via Dresden, Prague and Vienna and from December 2020 a Railjet service connects Bolzano in South Tyrol to Vienna via Brenner and Innsbruck.

On 12 December 2021 a new Railjet Express schedule was introduced by ÖBB between Frankfurt and Vienna via Stuttgart, Ulm, Biberach, Friedrichshafen, Lindau, Bregenz and Innsbruck.

Since April 2024 direct Railjet services connect Munich to Verona, Bologna and Venice via Innsbruck and Bolzano on the Brenner Railway replacing the old EuroCity trains and since 17 April 2025 a new Railjet in the same corridor was introduced, extending the service from Bologna up to Ancona and running until October.

Services to Ljubljana and/or Zagreb have been discussed since 2010 but have since not materialized.

== Passenger services ==
Railjet trains have three levels of service; economy, first and business classes.

Business class has the highest level of service, containing premium seating for 16 passengers located in the front part of the Control car at the opposite end of the train to the locomotive. The seating plan is in an 'open compartments' style similar to a corridor coach layout, but open plan and doorless, and intended to be a considerable improvement over previous first class accommodation. A galley separates the business and first class compartments.

First class seating occupies the remainder of the control car, the second coach and half of the third coach which also contains spaces and facilities for wheelchair users. 76 seats are provided in [2+1] formation. The remainder of the third coach contains the restaurant which provides an at seat service. The remaining four coaches provide 316 economy class seats in [2+2] formation, the fourth coach also contains an area for families and children.

From the 38th set of trains onwards the galley is replaced with a seated restaurant area.

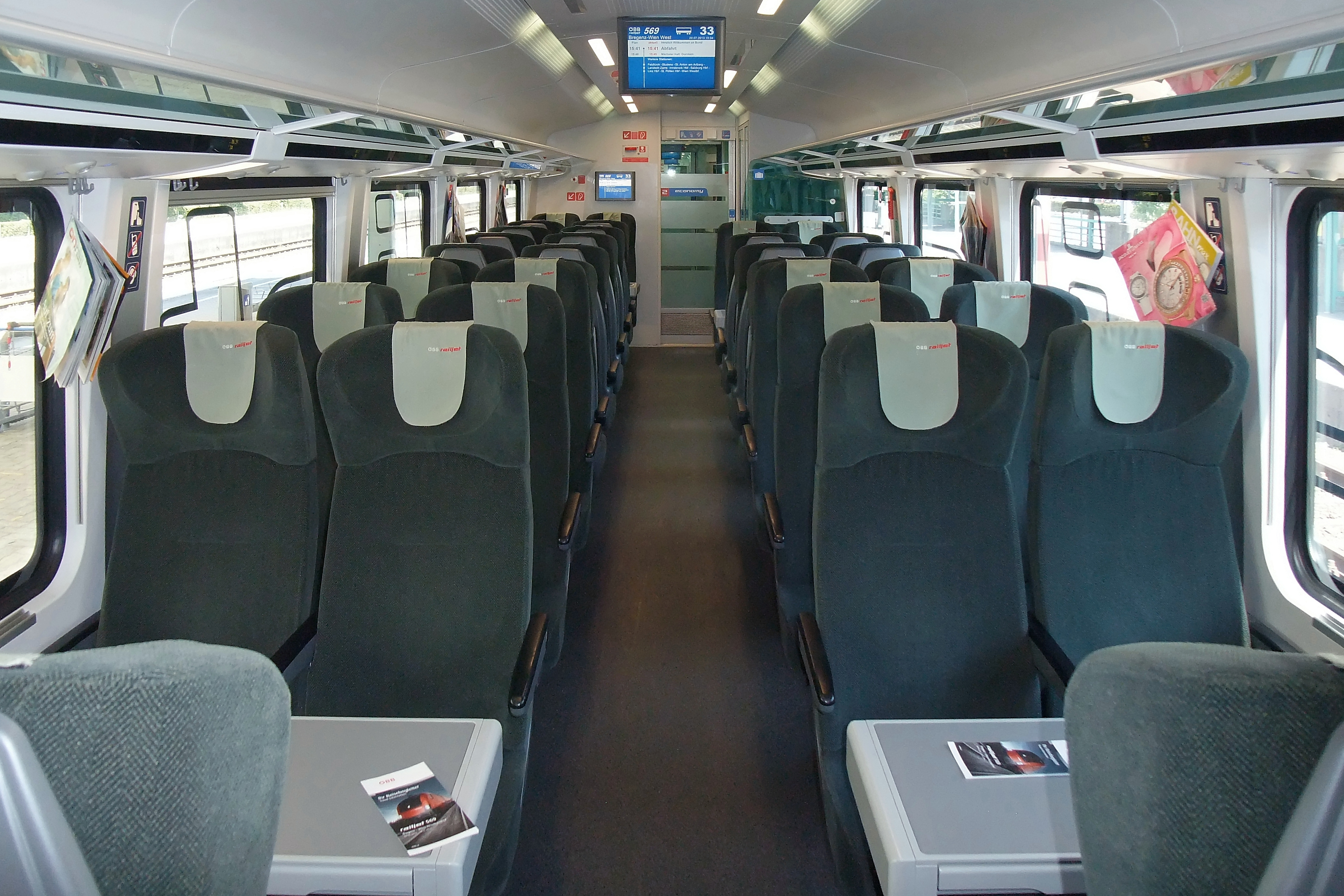
Economy class (ÖBB)

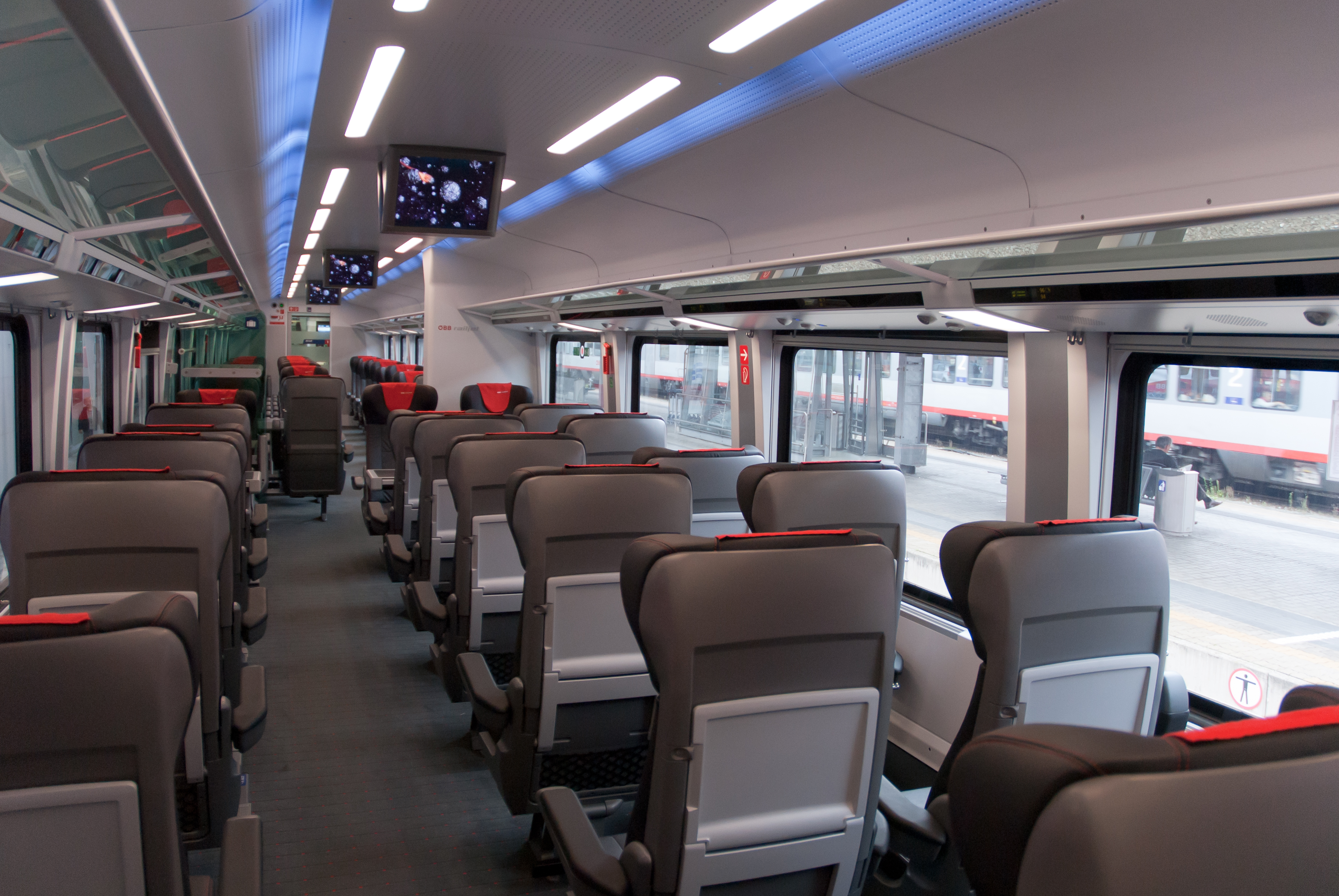
First class (ÖBB)

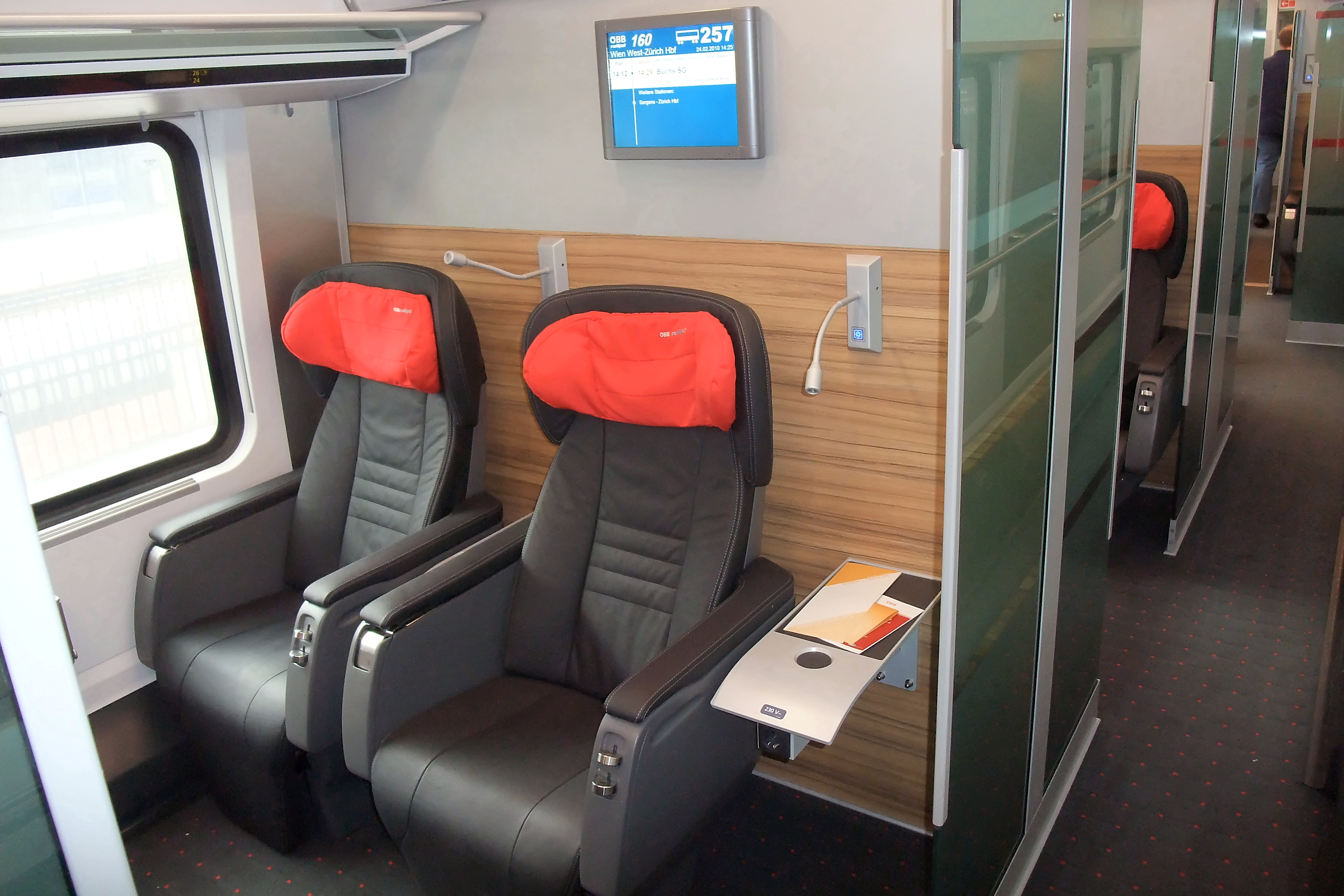
Business class (ÖBB)

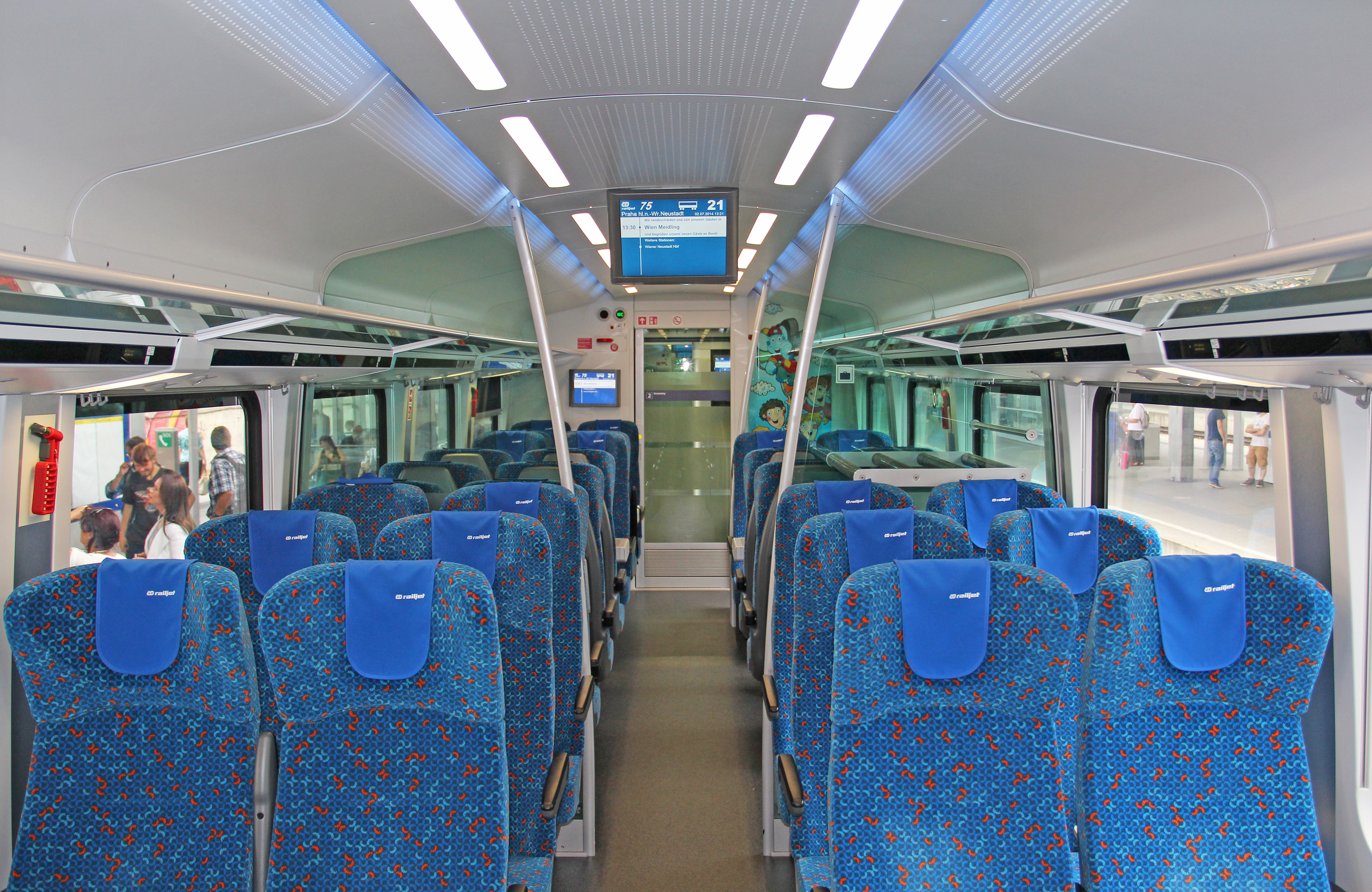
Economy class (ČD)

== See also ==
- List of high-speed trains
- Train categories in Europe
- Nightjet
- Rail transport in Austria
- Rail transport in the Czech Republic
