= Cluj-Napoca railway station =

Railway station in Romania

Cluj-Napoca
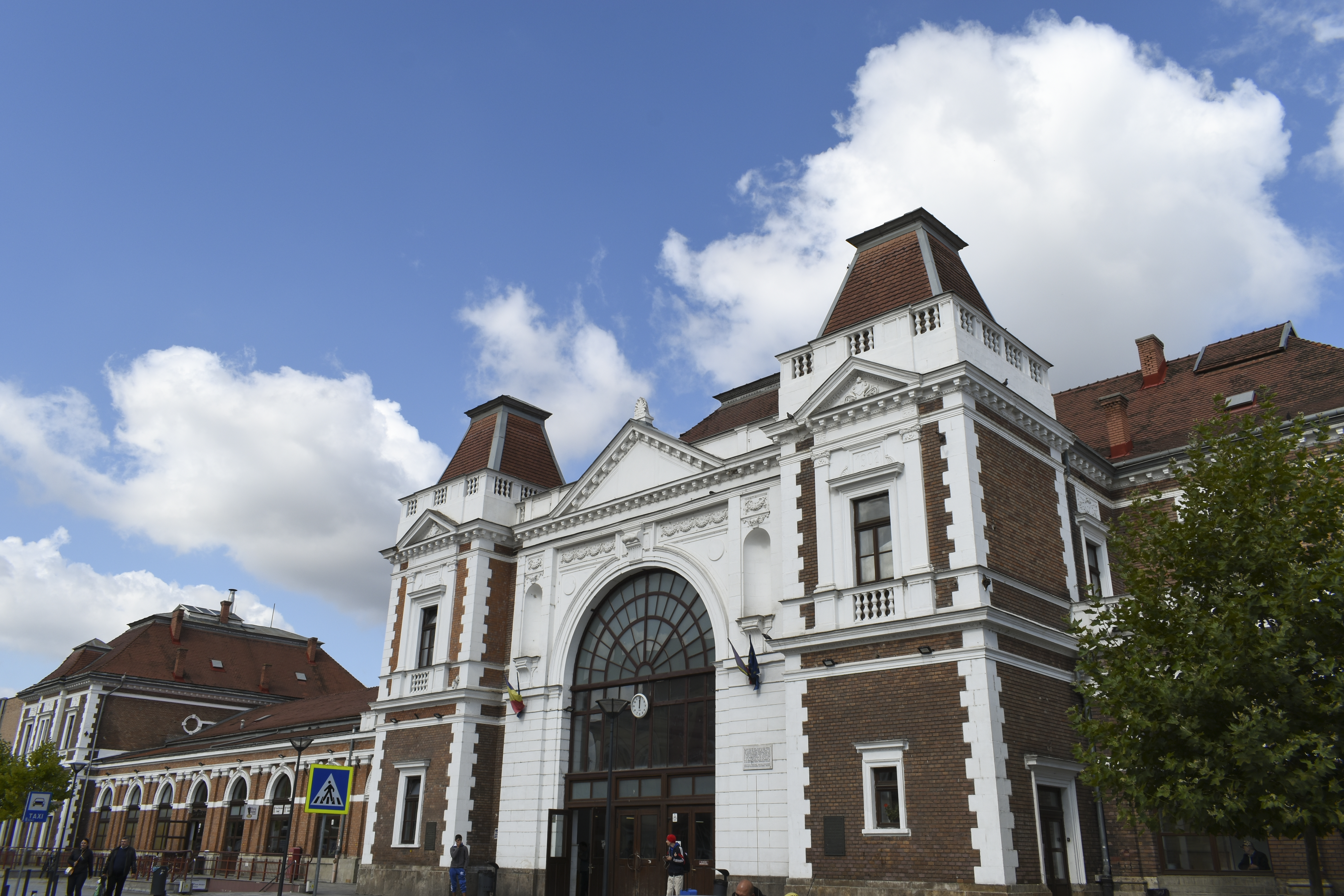
- View of the station building, in 2019

General information
- Location: Cluj-Napoca, Romania
- Coordinates: 46°47′3.717″N 23°35′10.99″E
- Owner: CFR

Services
Preceding station	CFR	Following station
Huedin towards Oradea	CFR Intercity 300	Câmpia Turzii towards București Nord
Location

Cluj-Napoca train station is the main railway station in Cluj-Napoca, Romania. It is located near the city center.

== History ==
Two plaques on the building commemorate the 100th and 125th anniversary of the opening of the station on September 7, 1870. The Cluj-Napoca railway station was designed and built by Hungarian architect Ferenc Pfaff, when the city was part of Kingdom of Hungary, Austro-Hungarian Empire.

== Current situation ==
The station is situated on the Căile Ferate Române line 300 Bucharest–Ploiești–Brașov–Teiuș–Cluj-Napoca–Oradea–Episcopia Bihor and the line Cluj-Napoca–Dej–Ilva Mică. As of 2008, Cluj-Napoca railway station serves about 100 passenger trains, including domestic trains operated by Căile Ferate Române. Cluj-Napoca offers connections with the majority of Romanian cities, as well as service to Budapest, Hungary and Vienna, Austria.

== Distance from other railway stations ==
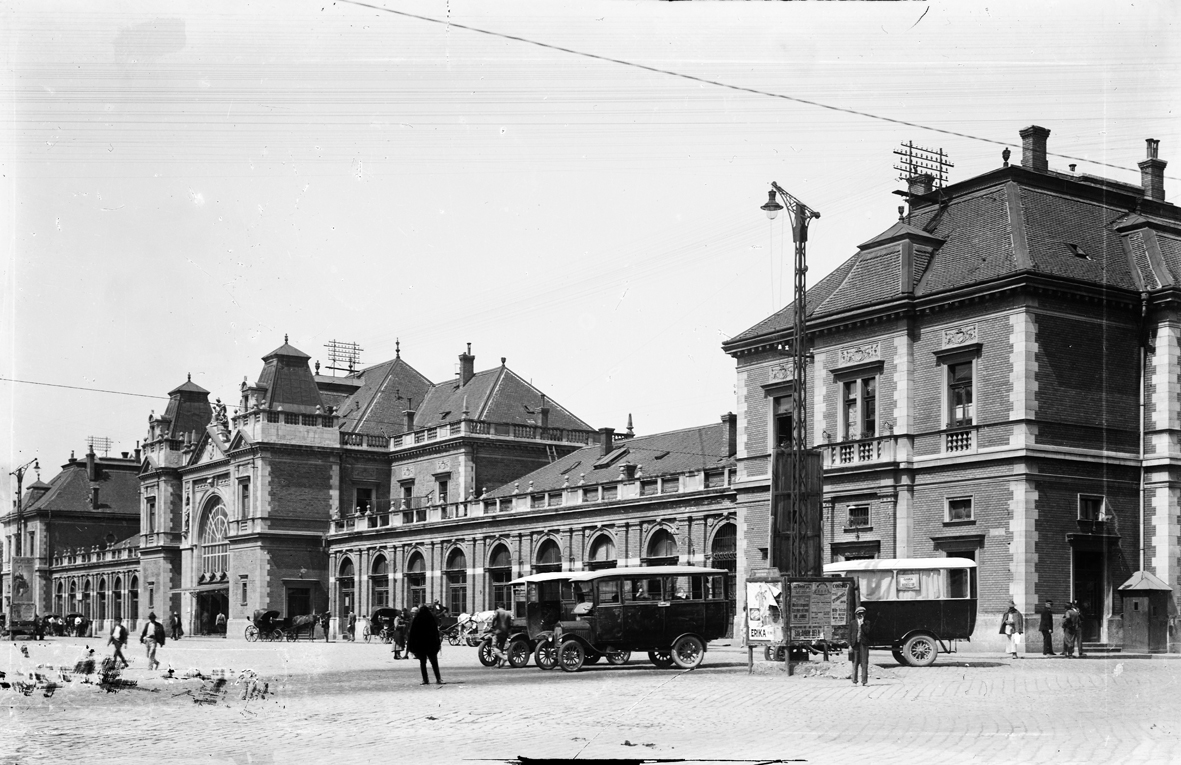
Early view of the station.

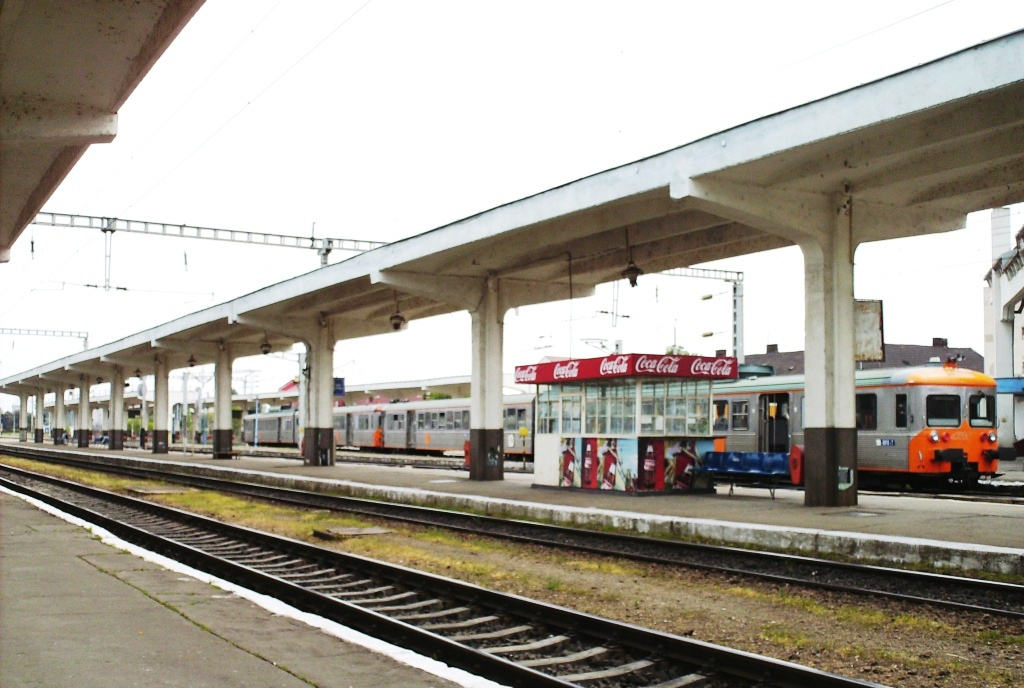
Train in Cluj Napoca railway station

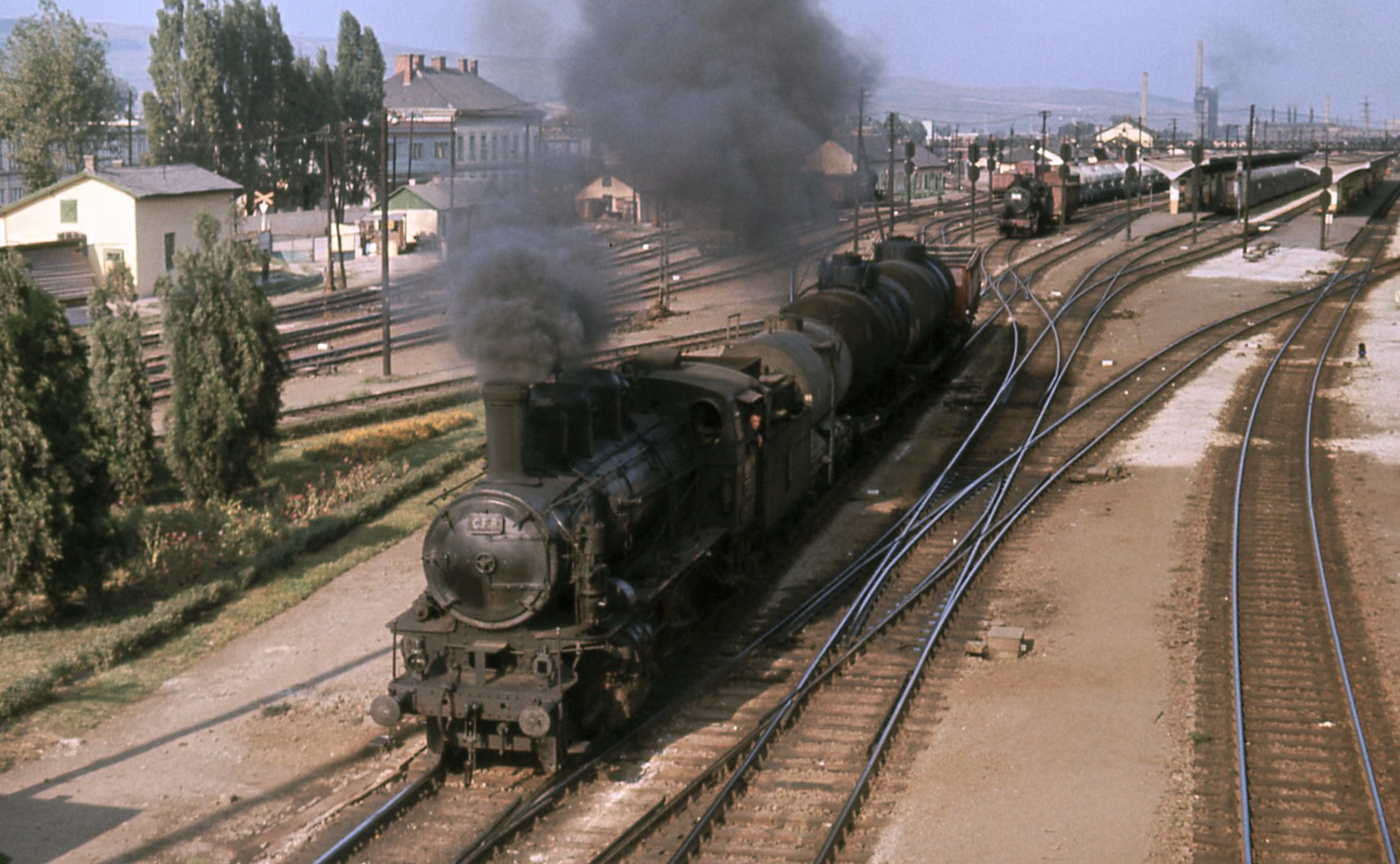
CFR classes 140 and 050 shunting at Cluj-Napoca, summer 1972

City	Country	km	Route
București Nord	Romania	497	
Arad	Romania	332	via Alba Iulia
Arad	Romania	279	via Oradea
Brașov	Romania	331	
Constanța	Romania	722	via București Nord
Constanța	Romania	718	via Buzău
Craiova	Romania	375	via Târgu Jiu
Galați	Romania	641	via Brașov
Galați	Romania	654	via Bacău, Suceava
Iași	Romania	458	
Oradea	Romania	152	
Satu Mare	Romania	252	via Baia Mare
Satu Mare	Romania	285	via Oradea
Suceava	Romania	322	
Timișoara Nord	Romania	330	via Oradea
Timișoara Nord	Romania	389	via Deva
Belgrade	Serbia	508	
Berlin	Germany	1,260	
Budapest	Hungary	400	
Chișinău	Moldova	588	
Frankfurt am Main	Germany	1,259	
Kyiv	Ukraine	1,116	via Suceava
Sofia	Bulgaria	1,033	via București Nord
Venice	Italy	1,252	
Vienna	Austria	672	
