= Wien Erzherzog-Karl-Straße railway station =

Railway station in Vienna, Austria

Wien Erzherzog-Karl-Straße
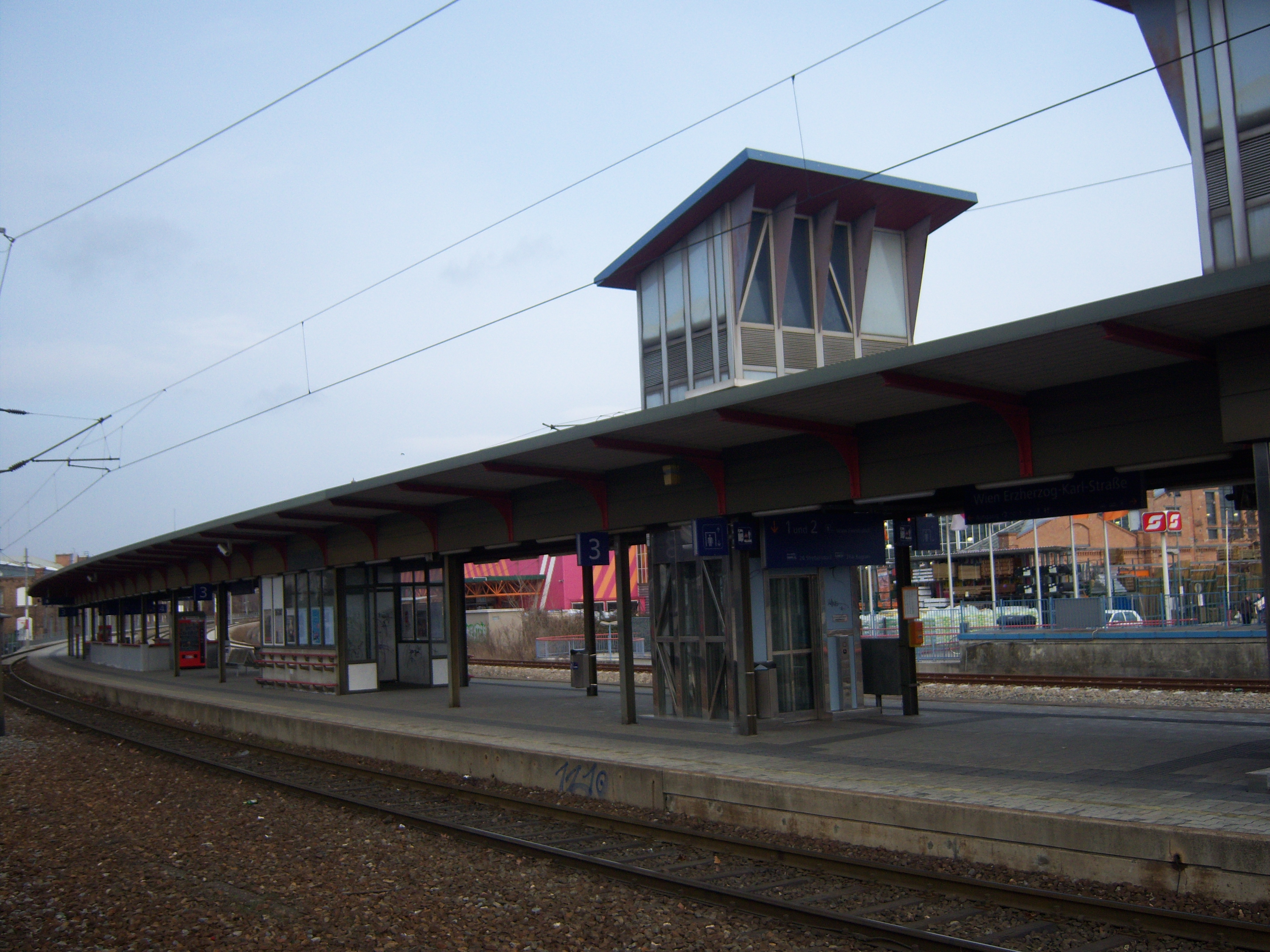
- The Marchegger Ostbahn platforms in 2009

General information
- Location: Vienna; Austria
- Coordinates: 48°13′47″N 16°27′11″E
- Owner: ÖBB
- Lines: Laaer Ostbahn; Marchegger Ostbahn
- Platforms: 2 island platforms
- Tracks: 4
- Train operators: ÖBB
- Connections: Bus

Services
Preceding station	ÖBB	Following station
Wien Stadlau towards Wien Hbf	R 81	Wien Hirschstetten towards Marchegg
Preceding station	Vienna S-Bahn	Following station
Wien Stadlau towards Wien Hütteldorf	S80	Wien Hirschstetten towards Wien Aspern Nord
Location

Wien Erzherzog-Karl-Straße is a railway station serving Donaustadt, the twenty-second district of Vienna. The station is a keilbahnhof located at the junction of the Laaer Ostbahn and Marchegger Ostbahn lines. It has an island platform on each line, although at present no passenger trains use the Laaer Ostbahn north of the station.

== Services ==
As of the December 2020 timetable change, the following services stop at Wien Erzherzog-Karl-Straße:

- Regionalzug (R): hourly service between Wien Hauptbahnhof and Marchegg.
- Vienna S-Bahn S80: half-hourly service between Wien Hütteldorf and Wien Aspern Nord.
