= Marchegger Ostbahn =

Railway line in Austria and Slovakia

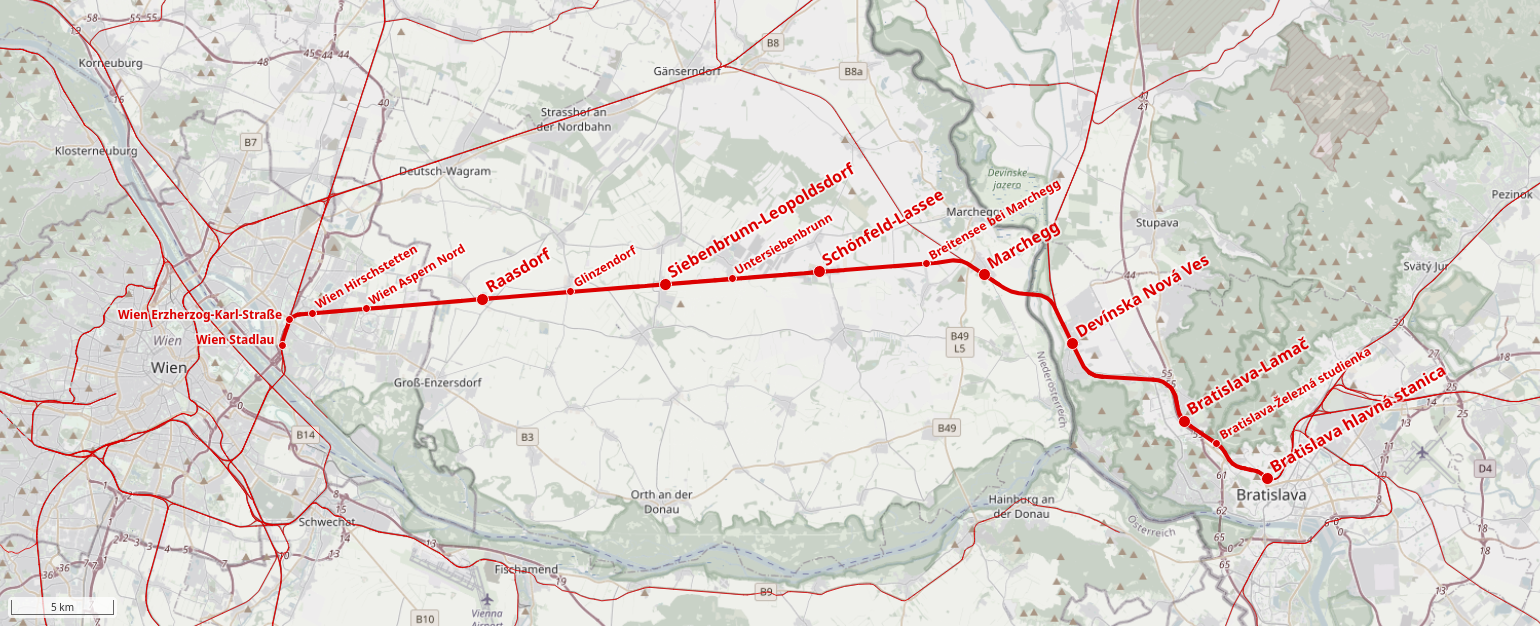
- Map showing the Marchegger Ostbahn within Austria

Technical
- Line length: 41.6 km (25.8 mi)
- Track gauge: 1,435 mm (4 ft 8 1/2 in) standard gauge
- Electrification: 15 kV 16.7 Hz AC (Wien Stadlau–Marchegg)

The Marchegger Ostbahn (lit. 'Marchegg Eastern railway line') is a railway line in Austria and Slovakia. It runs 41.6 kilometres (25.8 mi) from the Donaustadt district of Vienna to Marchegg, where it crosses the Morava river and enters Slovakia. At Devínska Nová Ves, it continues as the Bratislava–Marchegg railway line.

== History ==
The oldest section of the current Vienna-Bratislava line was constructed by the Hungarian Central Railway in 1848 and was one of the first sections of their planned Budapest-Vienna railway to enter service, alongside the initial sector from Budapest to Vácz. The locomotive "Bihár" hauled the inaugural train from Bratislava on the 10th of August 1848, continuing on to Vienna via the Gänserndorf–Marchegg line, opened a year earlier as a branch line of the Emperor Ferdinand Northern Railway's Nordbahn. Two years later, the company was nationalised as the Austrian Southeastern Railway, and the route to Budapest completed in 1854. At that time, trains ran at an average speed of 63kph, making the journey in six hours and ten minutes. At the start of 1855, the line was reprivatised under the Imperial Royal Privileged Austrian State Railway Company.

In 1866, the company extended their own trackage via a new air-line railroad that would take Budapest-Bratislava-Vienna trains straight from Marchegg into the city's Ostbahnhof via Stadlau, bypassing the detour to Gänserndorf and the need to pay track access charges to the Emperor Ferdinand Northern Railway; this new route opened in 1870 after complaints of unfair encroachment into the market area of the latter company were dismissed by the courts. The line was double-tracked in 1884, and taken into state ownership along with the rest of the company in 1909. Traffic decreased somewhat with the dissolution of Austria-Hungary after the First World War, and to a much greater degree between 1955 and 1989, when the Iron Curtain divided the line.

S-Bahn service was first introduced in 1976 with a temporary shuttle to Erzherzog-Karl-Straße station, substituting for cross-Danube bus and tram links severed by the collapse of the Reichsbrücke. Due to its popularity, the service was made permanent and extended to Hirschstetten-Aspern in 1980, and to Hausfeldstraße in 1987.

On December 9, 2012, all trains on the line began to use the then-unfinished Wien Hauptbahnhof.

The Marchegger Ostbahn was initially given low priority for upgrades, with a new corridor incorporating parts of the Pressburg Electric route, the planned Götzendorf Interconnect, and the Eastern Railway envisioned as the main Bratislava-Vienna intercity route in 2004-2013 revisions of the Trans-European Transport Networks Project 17 (Main Line for Europe). However, the potential value of the alternate air-line route was realised in the 2009-2013 policy review, and the Marchegger Ostbahn subsequently designated a high-priority component of the TEN-T Core Network and the Baltic-Adriatic Network for passenger traffic; through freight traffic will use the originally envisioned south-bank Danube route via Gramatneusiedl, Parndorf and Kittsee.

=== Former branch lines ===
The Marchegger Ostbahn once had a branch line from Siebenbrunn-Leopoldsdorf Station to Engelhartstetten, which in turn branched off at Breitstetten to Orth an der Donau. Passenger service to Orth was discontinued in 1933, and to Engelhartstetten in 2003. In 2013, the tracks were finally lifted.

Between 1916/1917 and 1926, the line was linked via a wye to the future Breitenlee Marshalling Yard; although the Great Depression caused the massive project to be shelved, the rights of way were reused as farm roads and are still clearly visible today.

== Route ==
The line splits from the Laaer Ostbahn near Wien Stadlau railway station, in the Donaustadt district of Vienna. It runs east from there to Marchegg. From Marchegg, the line crosses the Morava river and enters Slovakia. At Devínska Nová Ves, it continues as the Bratislava–Marchegg railway line.

Beginning in 2016, ÖBB has undertaken to double-track and electrify the line. Double-track and electrification opened between Wien Erzherzog-Karl-Straße and Wien Aspern Nord with the December 2018 timetable change. Electrification was extended to Marchegg in December 2022; work on double-tracking continues. Works to electrify the section from Marchegg to Devínska Nová Ves are going to start in March 2024 with the opening scheduled for December 2024. The project to double-track the section is under environmental review.

== Operation ==
S80 of the Vienna S-Bahn operates half-hourly between Wien Hütteldorf and Wien Aspern Nord. Some Regionalzug services operate between Wien Hauptbahnhof and Marchegg, while Regional-Express trains operate through between Wien Hauptbahnhof and Bratislava main.

Between the fall of the Iron Curtain and the late 2000s, the line was a little-used alternate route from Vienna to Bratislava, with infrequent through-service being provided in 2007 by single Class 5047 diesel railmotors or occasionally Class 5147 two-car units. By 2009, the route was reinstated as a main intercity corridor, with frequent loco-hauled regional expresses consisting of a Hercules diesel and at least four CityShuttle push-pull carriages replacing most of the DMUs. Starting in 2012, at least one air-conditioned ZSSK second-class carriage was added to all consists, and some trains also carried through-carriages from Kyiv. Since the full electrification of the line in 2025, the Regional Express has been operated by consists of Siemens Vectron locomotives and air-conditioned intercity carriages, either Slovak or Austrian, with the CityShuttle cab cars being retired by 2026.
