= Wien Simmering railway station =

Railway station in Vienna, Austria

Wien Simmering
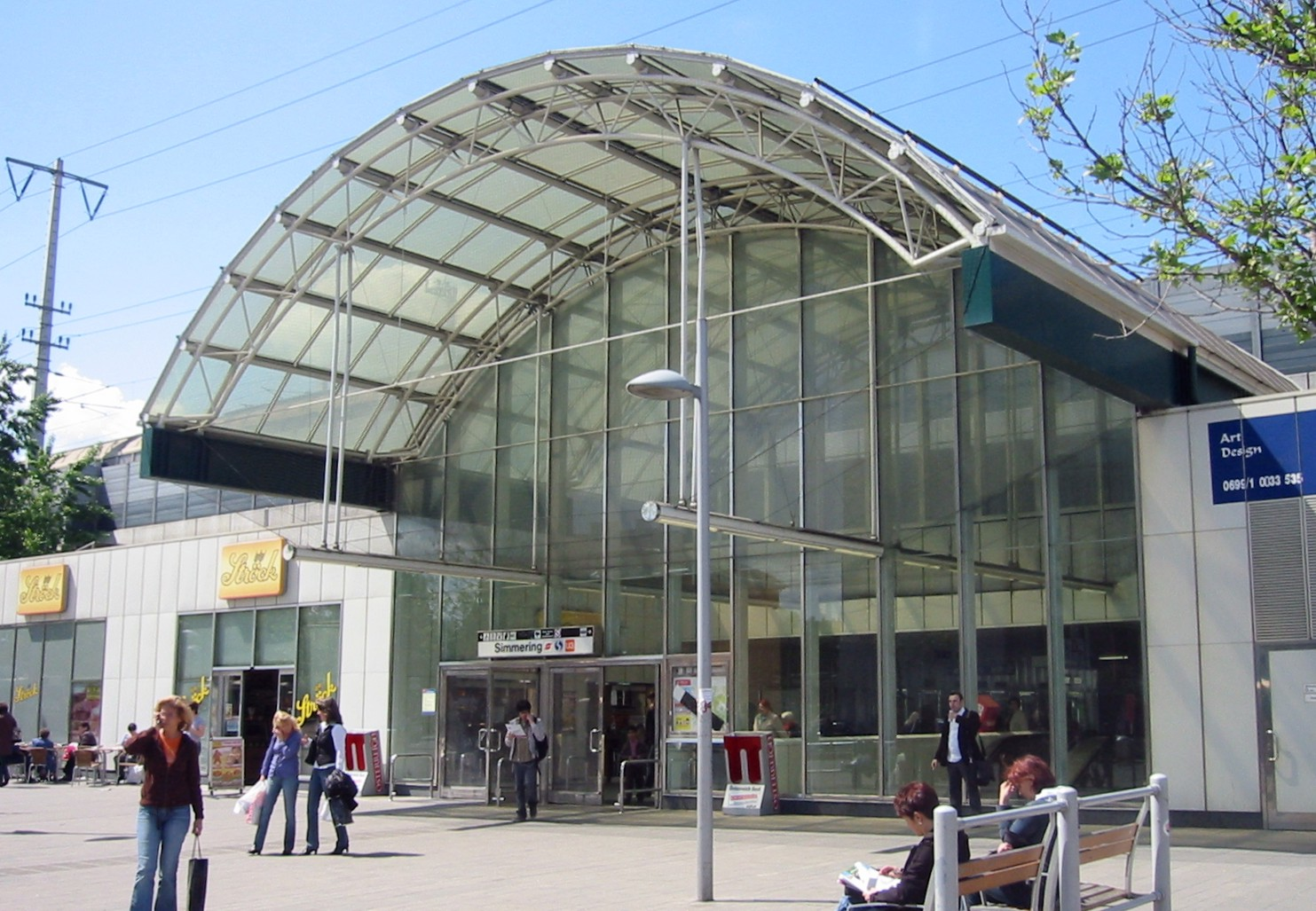
- The station entrance in 2008

General information
- Location: Simmeringer Hauptstraße; Vienna; Austria
- Coordinates: 48°10′N 16°25′E
- Owner: ÖBB
- Line: Laaer Ostbahn
- Platforms: 1 island platform
- Tracks: 2
- Train operators: ÖBB
- Connections: Bus

History
- Opened: 1976

Services
Preceding station	ÖBB	Following station
Wien Hbf Terminus	REX 8	Wien Stadlau towards Bratislava hl.st.
Wien Hbf Terminus	R 81	Wien Stadlau towards Marchegg
Preceding station	Vienna S-Bahn	Following station
Wien Hbf towards Wien Hütteldorf	S80	Wien Haidestraße towards Wien Aspern Nord
Location

Wien Simmering (German for Vienna Simmering) is a railway station located in the Simmering district of Vienna, Austria. Opened in 1976, it is owned and operated by the Austrian Federal Railways (ÖBB), and is served by international, regional and S-Bahn trains.

Underneath the station is the Simmering U-Bahn station, which is the southeastern terminus of U3 of the Vienna U-Bahn.

== Services ==
As of the December 2020 timetable change, the following services stop at Wien Simmering:

- REX: hourly service between Wien Hauptbahnhof and Bratislava.
- Regionalzug (R): hourly service between Wien Hauptbahnhof and Marchegg.
- Vienna S-Bahn S80: half-hourly service between Wien Hütteldorf and Wien Aspern Nord.
