= Verkehrsverbund Ost-Region =

Verkehrsverbund Ost-Region (VOR) Gesellschaft m.b.H.
- Abbreviation: VOR
- Formation: 1984
- Type: GmbH
- Headquarters: Wien Westbahnhof railway station Europaplatz 3/3; 1150 Wien; Austria
- Region served: Vienna, Lower Austria, Burgenland
- Owners: State governments of Vienna, Lower Austria, and Burgenland
- Leader: Alexander Schierhuber, Karin Zipperer
- Website: https://www.vor.at/

The Verkehrsverbund Ost-Region Gesellschaft m.b.H., abbreviated VOR, is the largest public transport association (Verkehrsverbund) in Austria, responsible for coordinating transport services in Vienna, Lower Austria, and Burgenland. While it does not operate any services of its own, its members such as Wiener Linien and ÖBB operate a variety of bus, tram, metro, S-Bahn, and regional rail services with a common fare structure and timetables coordinated by VOR.

== Participating operators ==
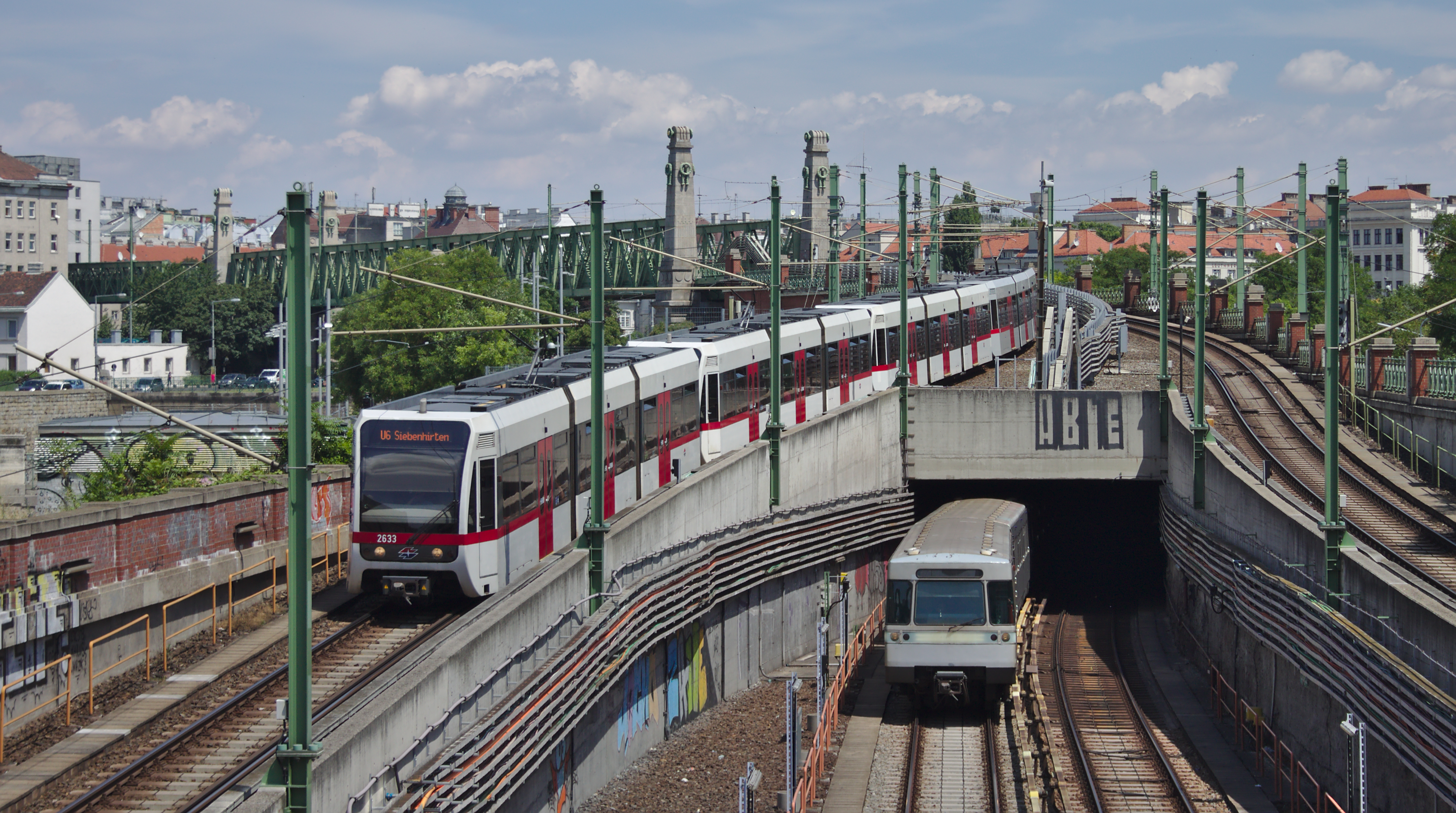
Vienna U-Bahn trains approaching Längenfeldgasse station

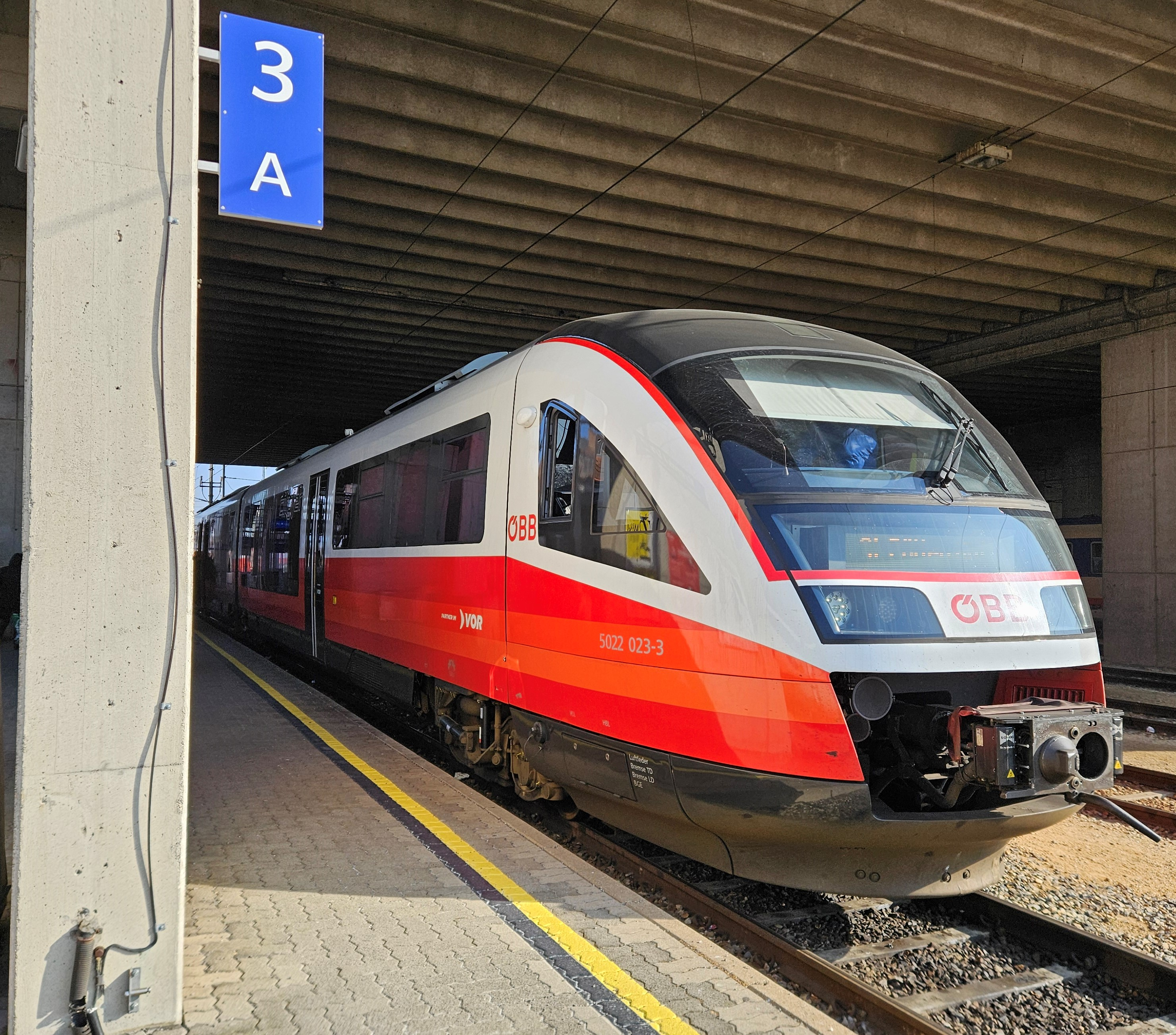
ÖBB regional train at Krems an der Donau station

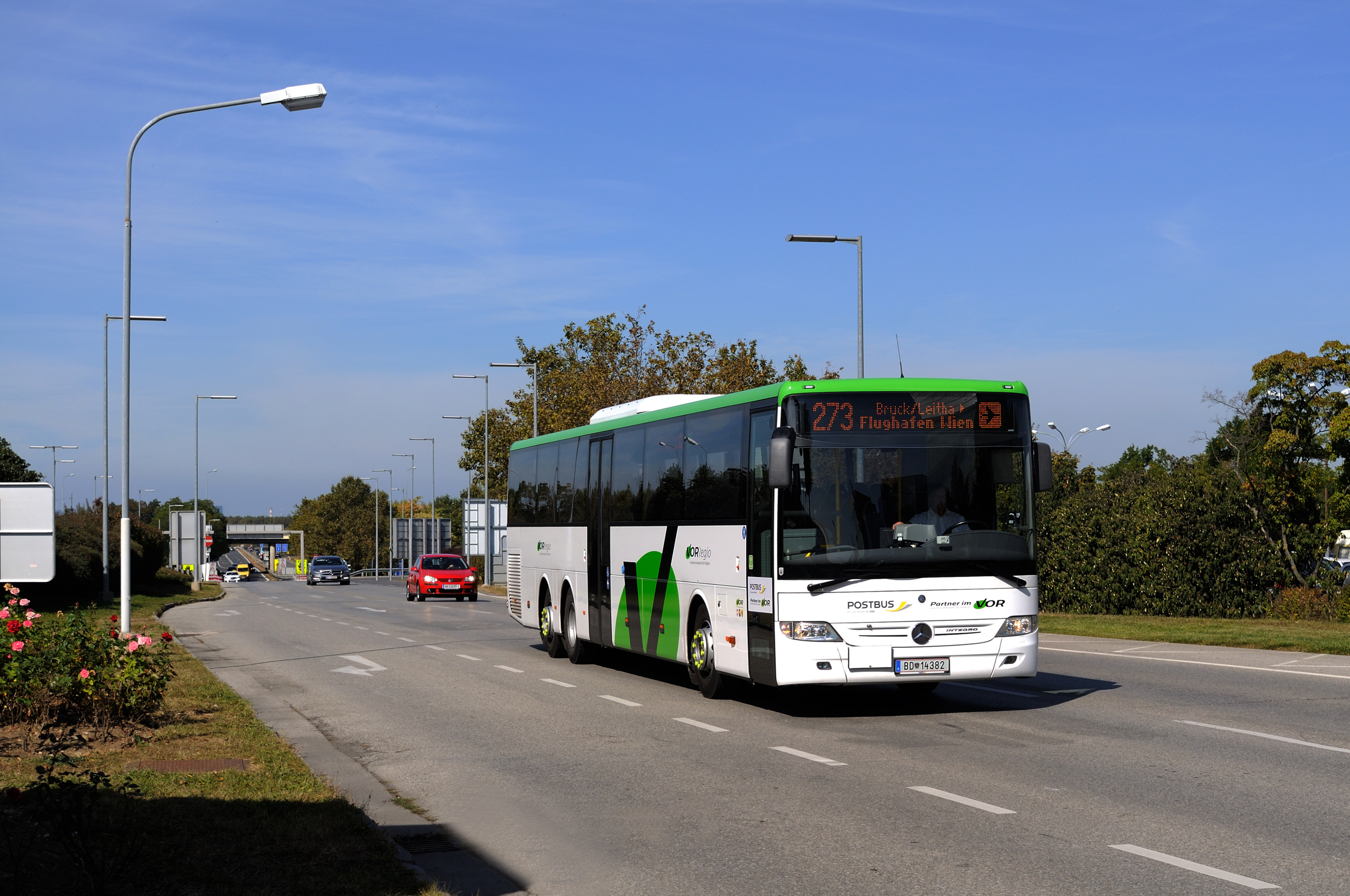
Mercedes-Benz Integro L of Postbus in VOR livery as line 273 at Vienna International Airport

The following agencies and companies operate services in VOR as of 2025:

- Blaguss
- Busam Reisen
- Dr. Richard
- Edtbrustner OG
- Frank Reisen
- Gschwindl
- Igler Autoreisen GmbH
- Jandrisevits Reisen GmbH
- Kerschner Reisen GmbH
- Knaus Reisen
- Köchl Ludwig Mietwagen und Linienverkehr
- Langthaler Transport GmbH & Co. KG
- Mitterbauer Reisen & Logistik GmbH
- N-Bus GmbH
- Niederösterreichische Verkehrsorganisations GmbH (NÖVOG)
- ÖBB Personenverkehr
- ÖBB-Postbus
- Oberger
- Partsch Verkehrsbetriebe GmbH
- Pichelbauer Reisen GmbH & Co. KG
- Raaberbahn
- Reisebüro Pölzl e.U.
- Retter Linien
- Sagmeister Reisen GmbH & Co. KG
- Schuch Autoreisen-Reisebüro GmbH
- Südburg Kraftwagen Betriebs-GmbH & Co. KG
- Temper Reisen
- Verkehrsbetriebe Burgenland
- Verkehrsbetriebe Stadtgemeinde Ybbs/Donau
- Wendl Josef
- WESTbahn
- Wiener Linien
- Wiener Lokalbahnen
- Wiener Neustädter Stadtwerke
- Winter Elisabeth Verkehrsbetriebe
- Wachau Touristik Bernhardt GmbH
- Ziegler Reisen GmbH (Südburg)
- Zuklin Bus GmbH

City Airport Train, Vienna Airport Lines (operated by Postbus), Flixbus, and Regiojet do not participate in VOR, nor do tourist or museum lines such as the Wachaubahn or Schneebergbahn.

== Fare system ==
Inside the Vienna core zone (formerly known as "Zone 100"), Wiener Linien's fare structure applies. Outside of Vienna, fares for single-trip and day tickets are based on distance, and are valid on any means of transport between the origin and destination. Tickets can be purchased online, with apps such as AnachB, or from ticket counters, ticket machines in some stations and vehicles, or drivers on regional buses. Fare enforcement is based on proof of payment, without any physical measures such as turnstiles. After several years of discussion, fare levels were standardized throughout VOR's entire service area in 2016.

The KlimaTicket Österreich is valid for all VOR services. VOR also offers the VOR KlimaTicket MetropolRegion for its entire service area, or the VOR KlimaTicket Region for Lower Austria and Burgenland, excluding Vienna.

== Services ==
=== Regional trains ===
Note: Stations listed in italics are not covered by VOR fares, as they are located in other states or countries.

Line	Stops
REX1	Břeclav – Bernhardsthal – Gänserndorf – Wien Floridsdorf – Wien Hauptbahnhof – Wien Meidling – Mödling – Baden – Wiener Neustadt
REX2	Laa an der Thaya – Mistelbach – Wolkersdorf – Wien Floridsdorf – Wien Rennweg; Note: REX2 continues from Wien Rennweg as S7.
REX3	Znojmo – Retz – Hollabrunn – Stockerau – Korneuburg – Wien Floridsdorf – Wien Hauptbahnhof – Wien Meidling – Mödling – Baden – Wiener Neustadt
REX4	Krems an der Donau – Absdorf-Hippersdorf – Tulln – Wien Franz-Josefs-Bahnhof
R40	St. Andrä-Wördern – Klosterneuburg-Kierling – Wien Franz-Josefs-Bahnhof
REX41	České Velenice – Gmünd NÖ – Sigmundsherberg – Absdorf-Hippersdorf – Tulln – Wien Franz-Josefs-Bahnhof
REX44	Horn – Krems an der Donau – St. Pölten Hauptbahnhof
R44	Sigmundsherberg – Horn – Krems an der Donau – St. Pölten Hauptbahnhof
CJX5	Amstetten – St. Pölten Hauptbahnhof – Tullnerfeld – Wien Westbahnhof
R52	Pöchlarn – St. Pölten Hauptbahnhof
R53	St. Valentin – Amstetten
R54	Hainfeld – Traisen – St. Pölten Hauptbahnhof
R55	Schrambach – Traisen – St. Pölten Hauptbahnhof
R56	Mariazell – Laubenbachmühle – St. Pölten Hauptbahnhof
R57	Scheibbs – Purgstall – Pöchlarn
R58	Kleinreifling – Weyer – Waidhofen an der Ybbs – Amstetten
R59	Citybahn Waidhofen
REX6	Deutschkreutz – Sopron – Ebenfurth – Wien Meidling – Wien Hauptbahnhof – Bruck an der Leitha – Bratislava-Petržalka
REX62	Wien Hauptbahnhof – Bruck an der Leitha – Nickelsdorf – Hegyeshalom (– Győr)
R62	Bruck an der Leitha – Nickelsdorf – Hegyeshalom (– Győr)
REX63	Wien Hauptbahnhof – Bruck an der Leitha – Neusiedl am See – Pamhagen (– Fertőszentmiklós)
REX64	Wien Hauptbahnhof – Bruck an der Leitha – Neusiedl am See – Eisenstadt – Wulkaprodersdorf
R64	Eisenstadt Schule – Wulkaprodersdorf
REX65	Wien Hauptbahnhof – Wien Meidling – Ebenfurth – Wulkaprodersdorf – Eisenstadt
REX7	Wien Floridsdorf – Wien Rennweg – Flughafen Wien – Wolfsthal
REX8	Wien Hauptbahnhof – Wien Stadlau – Wien Aspern Nord – Marchegg – Bratislava hlavná stanica
R81	Wien Hauptbahnhof – Wien Stadlau – Wien Aspern Nord – Marchegg
CJX9	Wien Floridsdorf – Wien Hauptbahnhof – Wien Meidling – Baden – Wiener Neustadt – Payerbach-Reichenau – Semmering – Mürzzuschlag
REX9	Wien Hauptbahnhof – Wien Meidling – Wiener Neustadt
R91	(Wiener Neustadt Hauptbahnhof –) Payerbach-Reichenau – Semmering – Mürzzuschlag
REX92; R92	Wiener Neustadt – Aspang – Friedberg
REX93	Wien Hauptbahnhof – Wien Meidling – Wiener Neustadt – Mattersburg – Sopron – Deutschkreutz
R93	Wiener Neustadt – Mattersburg – Sopron
R95	Wien Hauptbahnhof – Traiskirchen Aspangbahn – Wiener Neustadt
R96	Leobersdorf – Weissenbach-Neuhaus
REX97; R97	Wiener Neustadt – Bad Fischau-Brunn – Wöllersdorf – Pernitz-Muggendorf – Gutenstein
R98	Wiener Neustadt – Bad Fischau-Brunn – Puchberg am Schneeberg

== See also ==
- Vienna S-Bahn
- Transport in Austria
