= Wien Hirschstetten railway station =

Railway station in Vienna, Austria

Wien Hirschstetten
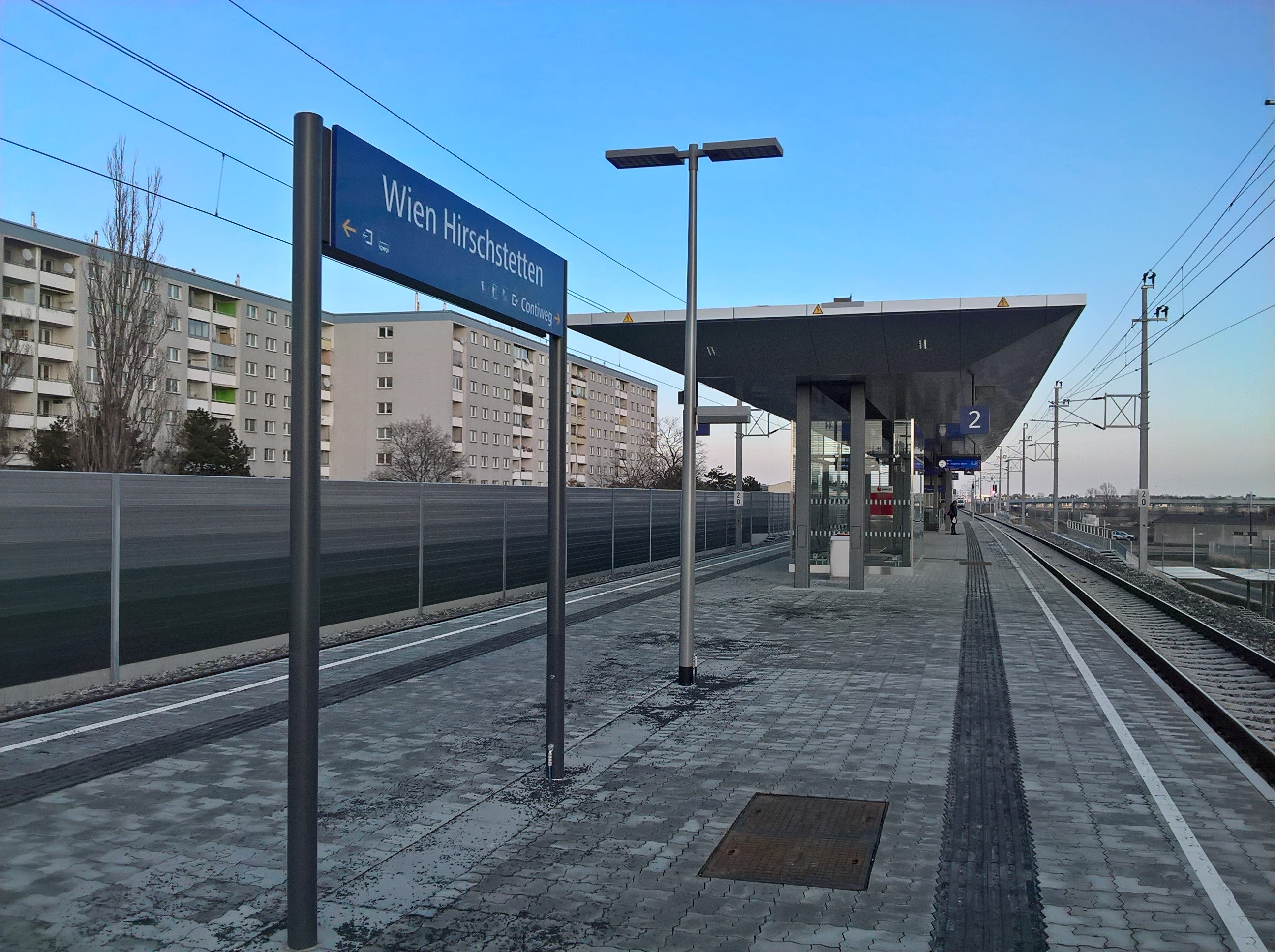
- The station platforms in 2019

General information
- Location: Vienna; Austria
- Coordinates: 48°13′58″N 16°28′09″E
- Owner: ÖBB
- Line: Marchegger Ostbahn
- Platforms: 1 island platform
- Tracks: 2
- Train operators: ÖBB
- Connections: Bus

Services
Preceding station	ÖBB	Following station
Wien Erzherzog-Karl-Straße towards Wien Hbf	R 81	Wien Aspern Nord towards Marchegg
Preceding station	Vienna S-Bahn	Following station
Wien Erzherzog-Karl-Straße towards Wien Hütteldorf	S80	Wien Aspern Nord Terminus
Location

Wien Hirschstetten is a railway station serving Donaustadt, the twenty-second district of Vienna.

== Services ==
As of the December 2020 timetable change, the following services stop at Wien Hirschstetten:

- Regionalzug (R): hourly service between Wien Hauptbahnhof and Marchegg.
- Vienna S-Bahn S80: half-hourly service between Wien Hütteldorf and Wien Aspern Nord.
