= Wien Praterkai railway station =

Railway station in Vienna, Austria

Wien Praterkai
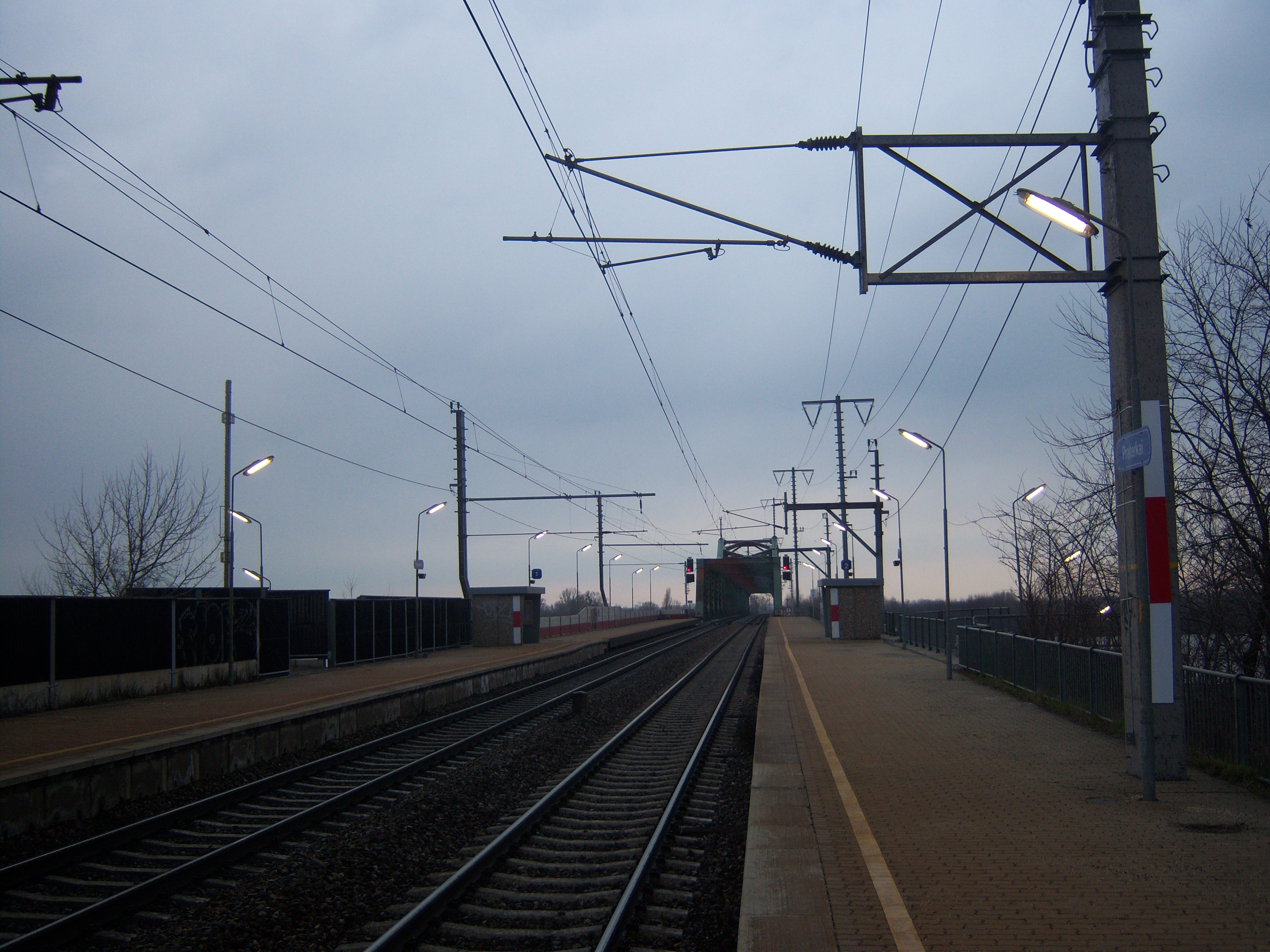
- The station platforms in 2009

General information
- Location: Vienna; Austria
- Coordinates: 48°11′58″N 16°26′28″E
- Owner: ÖBB
- Line: Laaer Ostbahn
- Platforms: 2 side platforms
- Tracks: 2
- Train operators: ÖBB

Services
Preceding station	Vienna S-Bahn	Following station
Wien Haidestraße towards Wien Hütteldorf	S80	Wien Stadlau towards Wien Aspern Nord
Location

Wien Praterkai is a railway station serving Leopoldstadt, the second district of Vienna.

== Services ==
As of the December 2020 timetable change, the following services stop at Wien Praterkai:

- Vienna S-Bahn S80: half-hourly service between Wien Hütteldorf and Wien Aspern Nord.
