= Wien Stadlau railway station =

Railway station in Vienna, Austria

Wien Stadlau
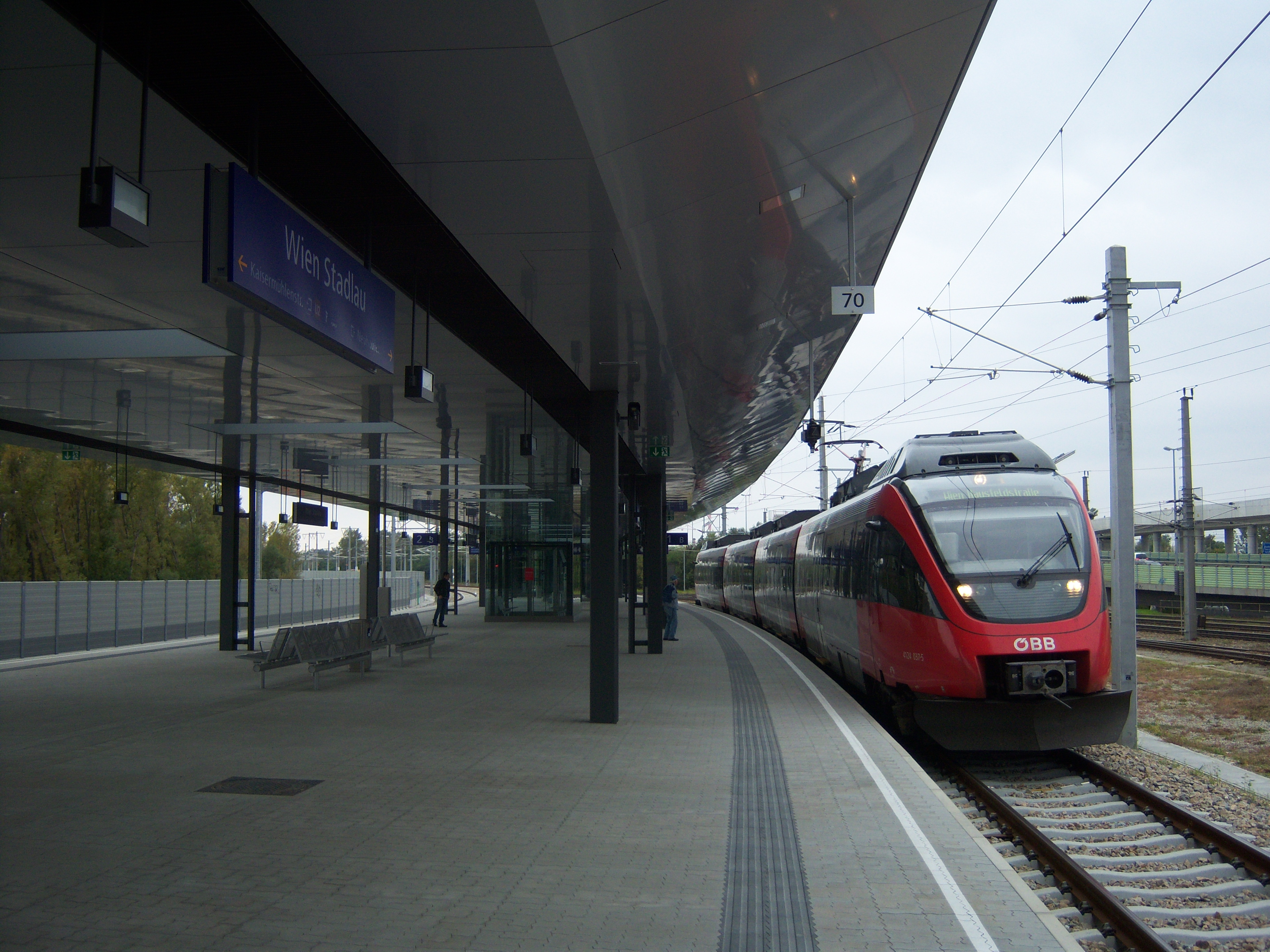
- An ÖBB train at the station in 2010

General information
- Location: Vienna; Austria
- Coordinates: 48°13′05″N 16°26′51″E
- Owner: ÖBB
- Line: Laaer Ostbahn
- Platforms: 1 island platform
- Tracks: 2
- Train operators: ÖBB
- Connections: 86A 87A 94A

Services
| Preceding station | ÖBB | Following station |
|---|---|---|
| Wien Simmering towards Wien Hbf | REX 8 | Wien Aspern Nord towards Bratislava hl.st. |
| Wien Simmering towards Wien Hbf | R 81 | Wien Erzherzog-Karl-Straße towards Marchegg |
| Preceding station | Vienna S-Bahn | Following station |
| Wien Praterkai towards Wien Hütteldorf | S80 | Wien Erzherzog-Karl-Straße towards Wien Aspern Nord |
Location

Wien Stadlau is a railway station serving Donaustadt, the twenty-second district of Vienna.

Above the station is the Stadlau U-Bahn station.

== Services ==
As of the December 2020 timetable change, the following services stop at Wien Stadlau:

- REX: hourly service between Wien Hauptbahnhof and Bratislava.
- Regionalzug (R): hourly service between Wien Hauptbahnhof and Marchegg.
- Vienna S-Bahn S80: half-hourly service between Wien Hütteldorf and Wien Aspern Nord.
