= Laaer Ostbahn =

Railway line in Austria

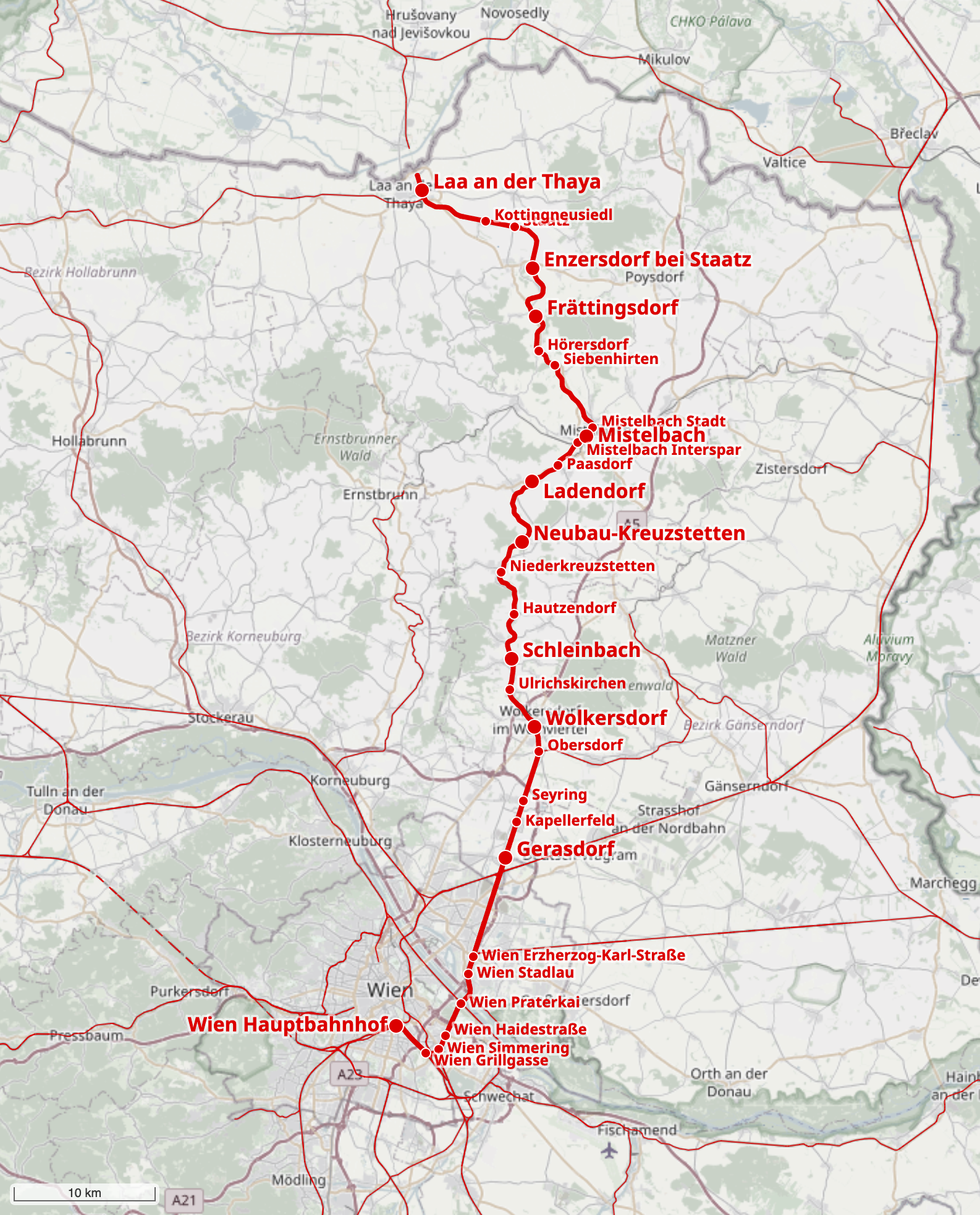

Overview
- Termini: Wien Hauptbahnhof; Laa an der Thaya

Service
- Services: Regional-Express; Regionalzug; Vienna S-Bahn:

Technical
- Line length: 82.6 km (51.3 mi)
- Track gauge: 1,435 mm (4 ft 8 1/2 in) standard gauge
- Electrification: 15 kV 16.7 Hz AC

The Laaer Ostbahn (lit. 'Laa Eastern railway line') is a railway line in Lower Austria. It runs 82.6 kilometres (51.3 mi) from Wien Hauptbahnhof to Laa an der Thaya, on the Czech–Austrian border. The line formerly continued to Brno. Austrian Federal Railways (ÖBB) owns and operates the line.

== Route ==
The Laaer Ostbahn begins at Wien Hauptbahnhof in Vienna and then turns north, splitting from the Eastern Railway and crossing the Donaukanal and Danube. At Wien Erzherzog-Karl-Straße, the Marchegger Ostbahn splits to the east while the Laaer Ostbahn continues north. Near Gerasdorf, the Laaer Ostbahn crosses and interchanges with the North railway. Continuing north, the line terminates at Laa an der Thaya, on the border with the Czech Republic. The line beyond Laa an der Thaya to Hevlín and Brno was severed in 1945, as a result of the Second World War.

== Operation ==
The southern end of the Laaer Ostbahn hosts the S1 and S80 of the Vienna S-Bahn, as well as Regional-Express and Regionalzug services, all of which leave the line at Wien Erzherzog-Karl-Straße and use the Marchegger Ostbahn for Wien Aspern Nord, Marchegg, or Bratislava main.

On the northern end, Regional-Express and S2 trains join the line at Gerasdorf, coming off the North railway. Services operate to Laa an der Thaya. There are no local services between Wien Erzherzog-Karl-Straße and Gerasdorf; some long-distance services such the EuroCity between Vienna and Katowice use that portion of the line to reach Břeclav.
