= Regionalbahn =

Regional rail in Germany

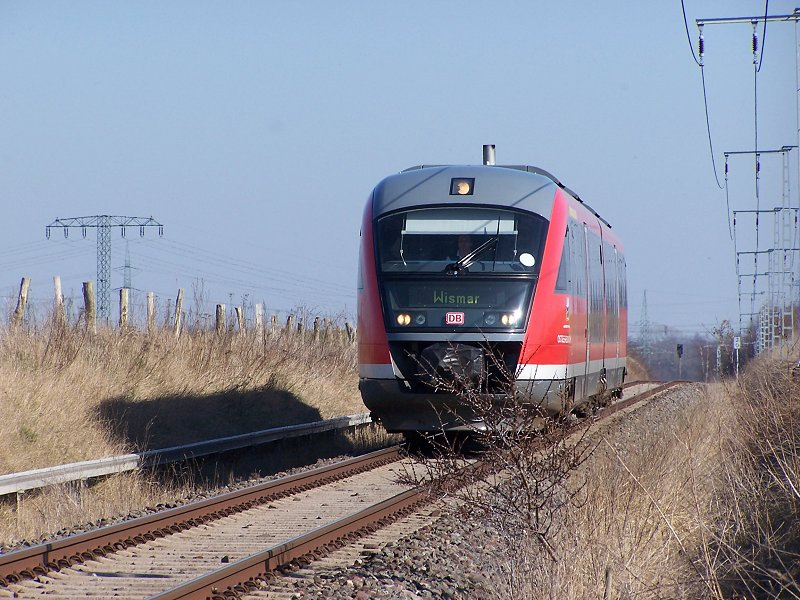
RB train (Class 642)

The Regionalbahn (German: [ʁeɡi̯oˈnaːlˌbaːn]; lit. Regional train; abbreviated RB) is a type of local passenger train (stopping train) in Germany. It is similar to the Regionalzug (R) and Regio (R) train categories in neighboring Austria and Switzerland, respectively.

== Service ==
Regionalbahn trains usually call at all stations on a given line, with the exception of RB trains within S-Bahn networks - these may only call at selected stations. Thus, they rank below the Regional-Express train, which regularly stops only at selected stations on its route.

== Operators ==
RB trains are subject to franchising by the federal states of Germany. Most services are operated by Deutsche Bahn under its DB Regio brand, but private companies such as Abellio Deutschland, Eurobahn and Transdev Germany operate services as part of franchise agreements.

There is no obligation to use the term Regionalbahn for basic local services; some private rail operators therefore use their own names to denote their trains.

== Stock ==
RB services make use of vastly different types of rolling stock; on electrified lines, double-deck cars or EMUs may be used, DMUs like the Bombardier Talent.

== See also ==
- List of regional rail lines in North Rhine-Westphalia
- Train categories in Europe
- Regional rail
