= Gänserndorf–Marchegg railway line =

Railway line in Austria

Gänserndorf–Marchegg
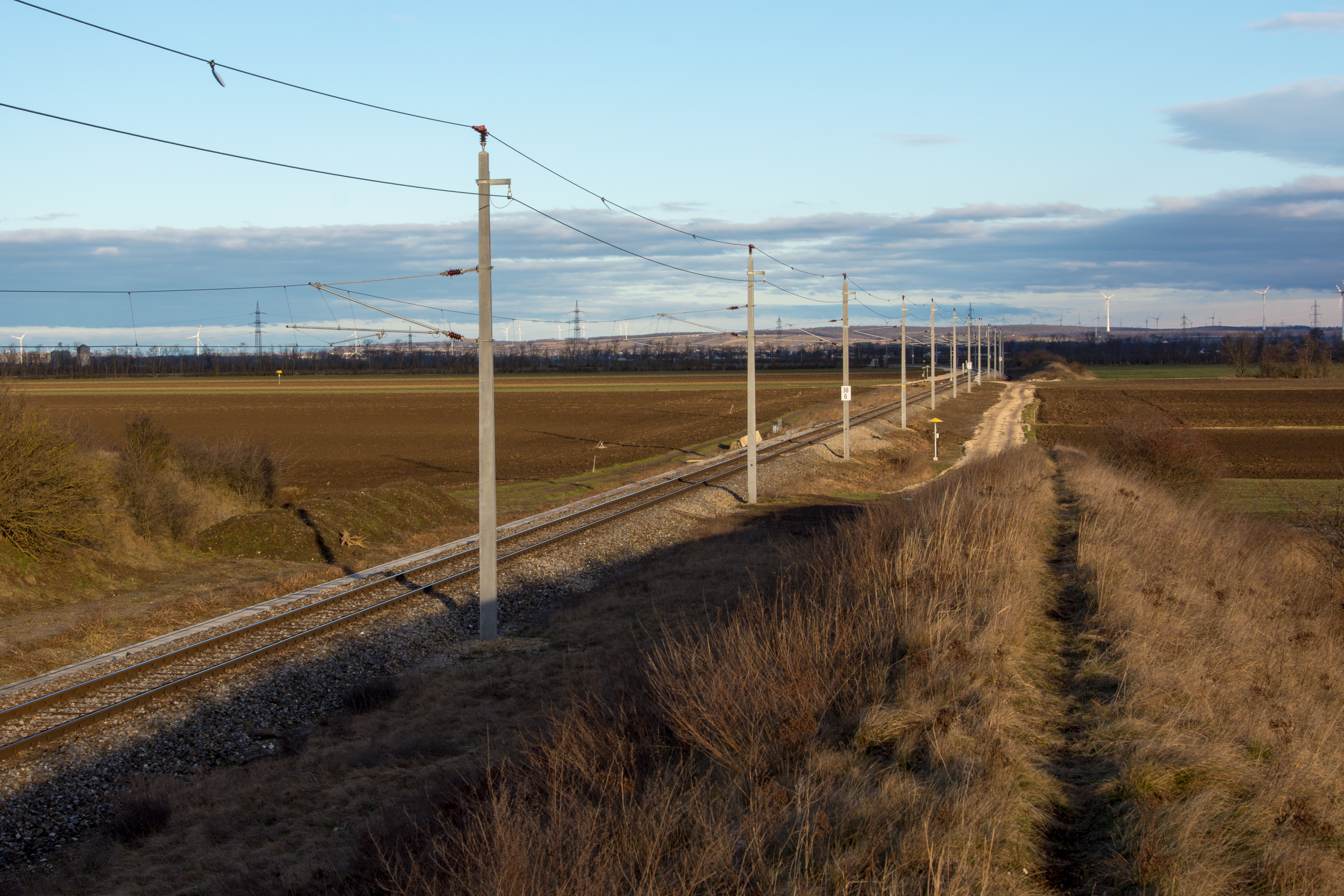
- The railway line near Oberweiden in 2021

Overview
- Line number: 115 01
- Termini: Gänserndorf; Marchegg
- Stations: 3

Service

History
- Opened: 20 August 1848

Technical
- Line length: 18.2 km (11.3 mi)
- Track gauge: 1,435 mm (4 ft 8 1/2 in) standard gauge
- Electrification: 15 kV 16.7 Hz AC

The Gänserndorf–Marchegg railway line is a single-tracked electrified railway line that runs 18.2 kilometres (11.3 mi) from Gänserndorf to Marchegg, in Austria. It connects the North railway line at Gänserndorf with the Marchegger Ostbahn at Marchegg, on the Austrian–Slovak border.

== Route ==
The Gänserndorf–Marchegg railway line begins at Gänserndorf, where it splits off from the North railway line, which runs between Wien Praterstern and Břeclav. The line runs southeast toward the border with Slovakia, with a single intermediate stop at Oberweiden. At Marchegg the line meets the Marchegger Ostbahn, which continues across the border.

== History ==
The railway line was built by the Emperor Ferdinand Northern Railway and opened on 20 August 1848. At the same time, the Hungarian Central Railway completed a connecting line from Marchegg to Pressburg (now Bratislava). On January 10, 2012, the route was declared a high-performance route and in 2012 an application was submitted to electrify the area between the Gänserndorf station and Marchegg.

The line was closed from July–December 2020 while electrification work took place. The line reopened with electrified service on 13 December 2020.

== Service ==
The S1 of the Vienna S-Bahn operates hourly between Gänserndorf and Marchegg.
