= Götzendorf Interconnect =

Proposed railway line for 2028–35

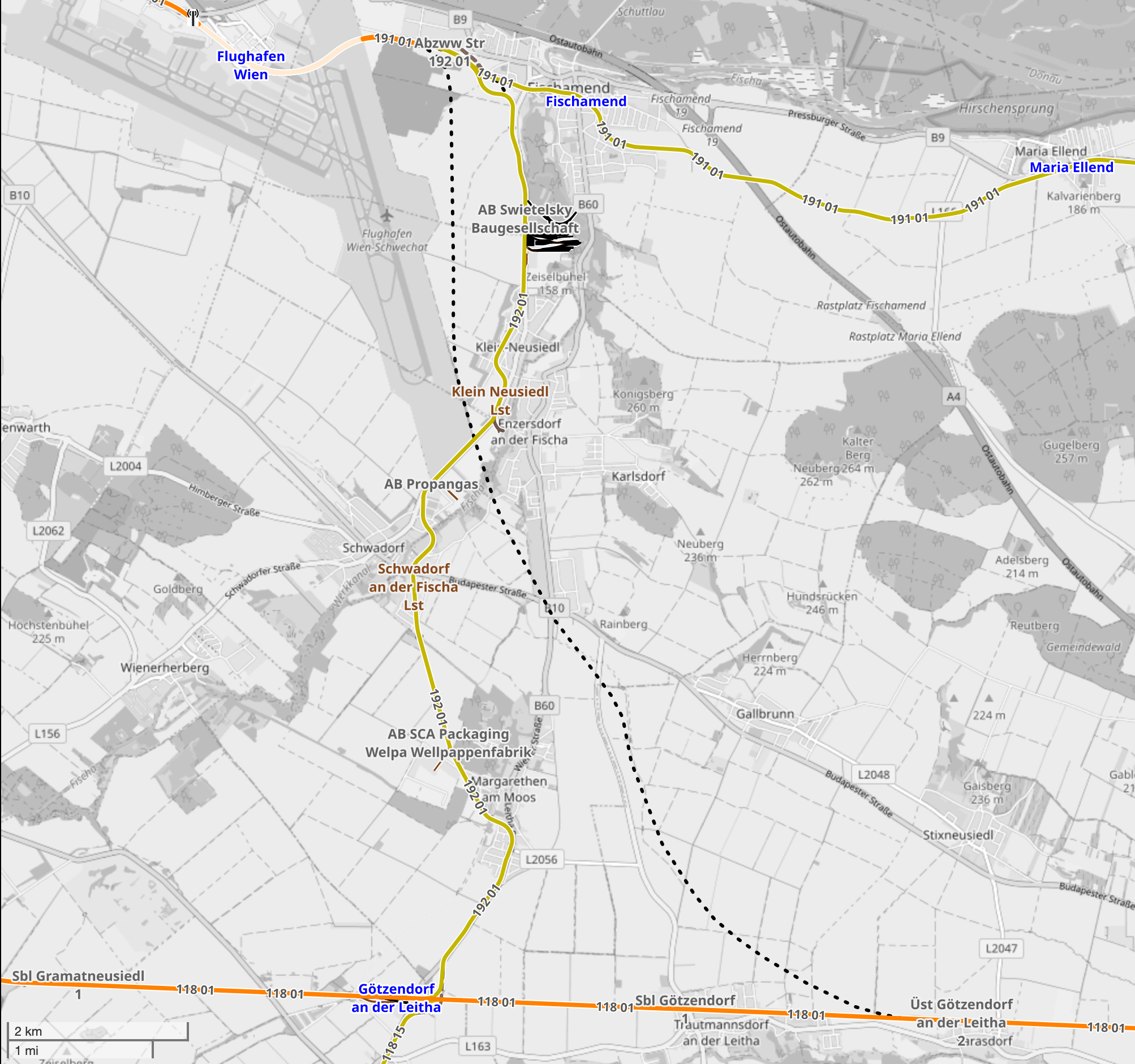
Overview of the current Airport Interconnect proposal (2023)

The Götzendorf Interconnect (German: Götzendorfer Spange) is a proposed railway line in Austria linking the Pressburg Electric Railway to the Eastern Railway. The original 14 kilometres (8.7 mi) long line, initially single track with provision for future double-tracking and a maximum design speed of 160 kilometres per hour (99 mph), was to begin west of Fischamend, turn sharply south through Schwadorf and Enzersdorf an der Fischa, cross highway B10, and join the Ostbahn at Götzendorf; construction was scheduled to take place from 2013 to 2016 at a cost of €140,000,000.

After budget cuts in 2012 put the project on hold for the foreseeable future, the proposal was altered and renamed the Airport Interconnect (German: Flughafenspange) in 2015. The current planned route, finalised from 2019 to 2021, will run next to the A4 freeway with a design speed of 250 kilometres per hour (160 mph); construction is currently scheduled to be completed between 2028 and 2035.

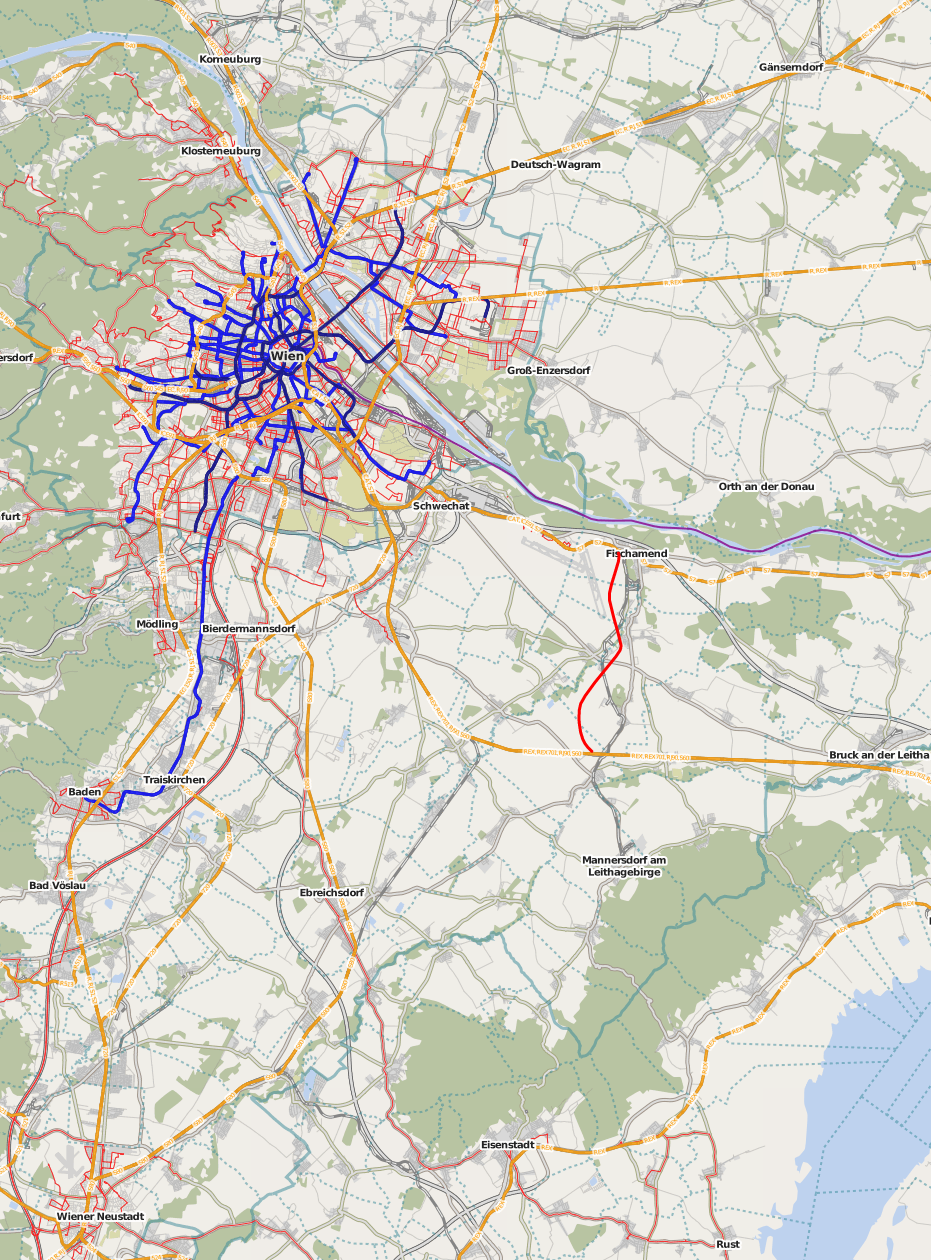
Overview of the pre-2015 proposal
