= S1 (Vienna) =

Railway line in Vienna, Austria

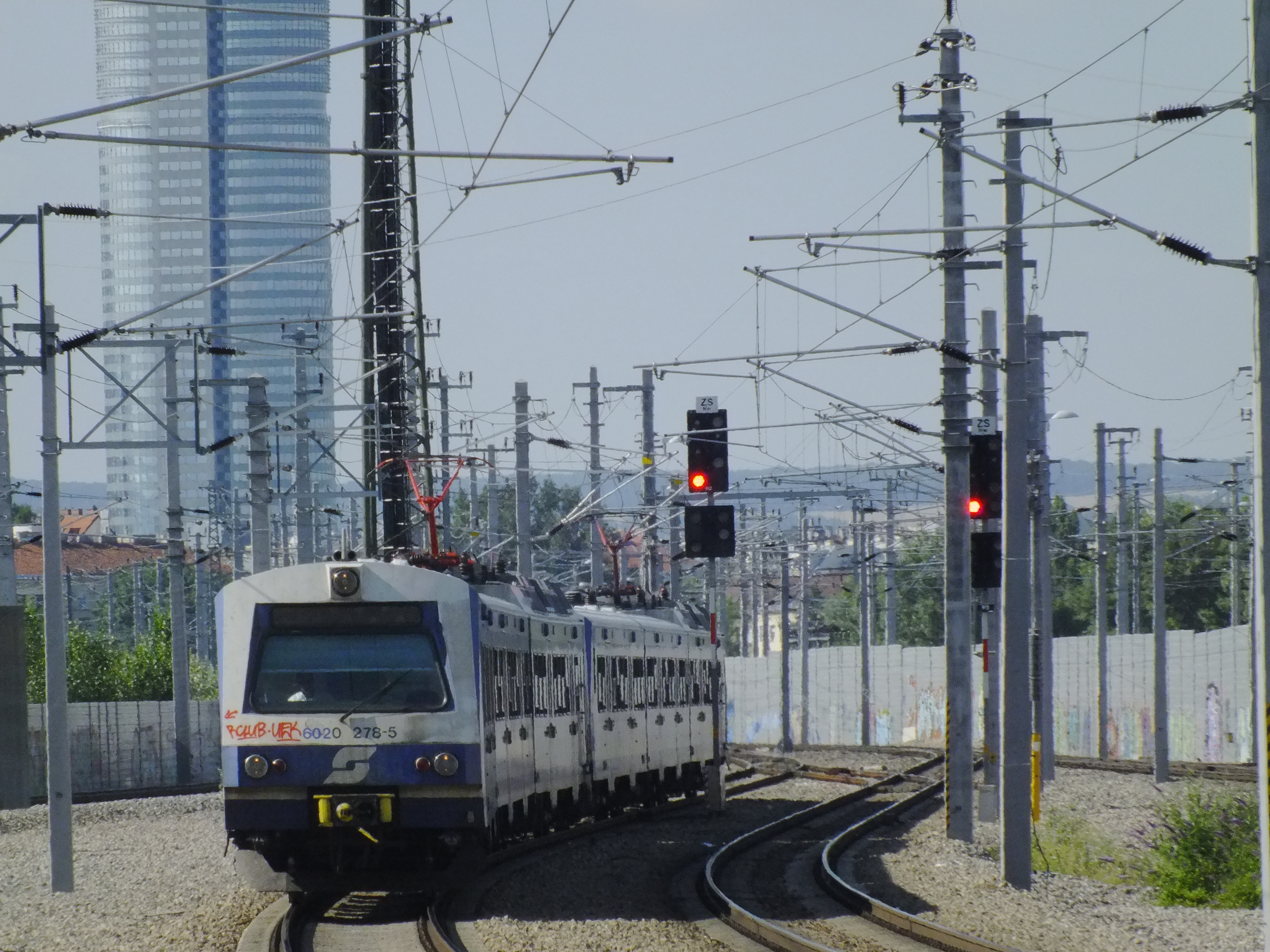
- An S1 train to Wien Meidling at Wien Praterstern.

Overview
- First service: 12 January 1962
- Current operator: ÖBB

Route
- Termini: Marchegg; Wien Meidling
- Stops: 20
- Lines used: Stammstrecke; North railway line; Gänserndorf–Marchegg railway line

The S1 is a railway service of the Vienna S-Bahn that operates between Marchegg and Wien Meidling. ÖBB operates the service.

== History ==
The first plan for the Vienna S-Bahn was drafted in 1954, however due to World War II, the tracks around Vienna were badly damaged. The Federal railways invested heavily in this project as Vienna's railway infrastructure was basically reconstructed. A trunk line connecting the northern railway with the southern railway was built through the city center. On 31 May 1959, the northern railway bridge was reopened allowing rail traffic from Floridsdorf to enter the city to Praterstern. In the beginning of 1960, a second track was added to the trunk line in anticipation of the new traffic however, in the same year, a funding crisis temporarily halted construction and delayed opening by more than a year. On 8 January 1962 the first trail runs were made by two 4061 class electric locomotives and on 17 January 1962, the S-Bahn officially opened. A big ceremony was held at South station as the inaugural train departed to Gänserndorf. Austrian president Adolf Schärf, Vice Chancellor Bruno Pittermann, Mayor Franz Jonas, ÖBB president Maximilian Schantl and Transport Minister Karl Waldbrunner took part in the ceremony along with over 900 invited guests. Revenue service started at 23:45 that evening.

The S-Bahn was an instant success. Many trains were overcrowded through the city center paving way for an agreement with VOR, the regional public transport company, allowing passengers to use city trams and S-Bahn trains with the same ticket. Service frequency was originally every hour but due to heavy ridership, frequency was increased to every half-hour on 28 May 1967. The tracks north of the Danube were renovated in 1972. In 1977 a park-and-ride facility was opened in Gänserndorf. Shortly after several more facilities were opened in other stations. On 23 May 1982 frequency was increased to Leopoldau to every 15 minutes in anticipation of the opening of the S2 line. Two new stations; Süßenbrunn and Helmahof were opened in 1980 and 1984 respectively. When the U1 line of the Vienna U-Bahn was completed to Leopoldau, a connection was built from the U-Bahn station to the S-Bahn station.

The S1 was extended from Gänserndorf to Marchegg in December 2020, following the electrification of the Gänserndorf–Marchegg railway line.
