= Wien Hauptbahnhof =

Railway station in Vienna, Austria

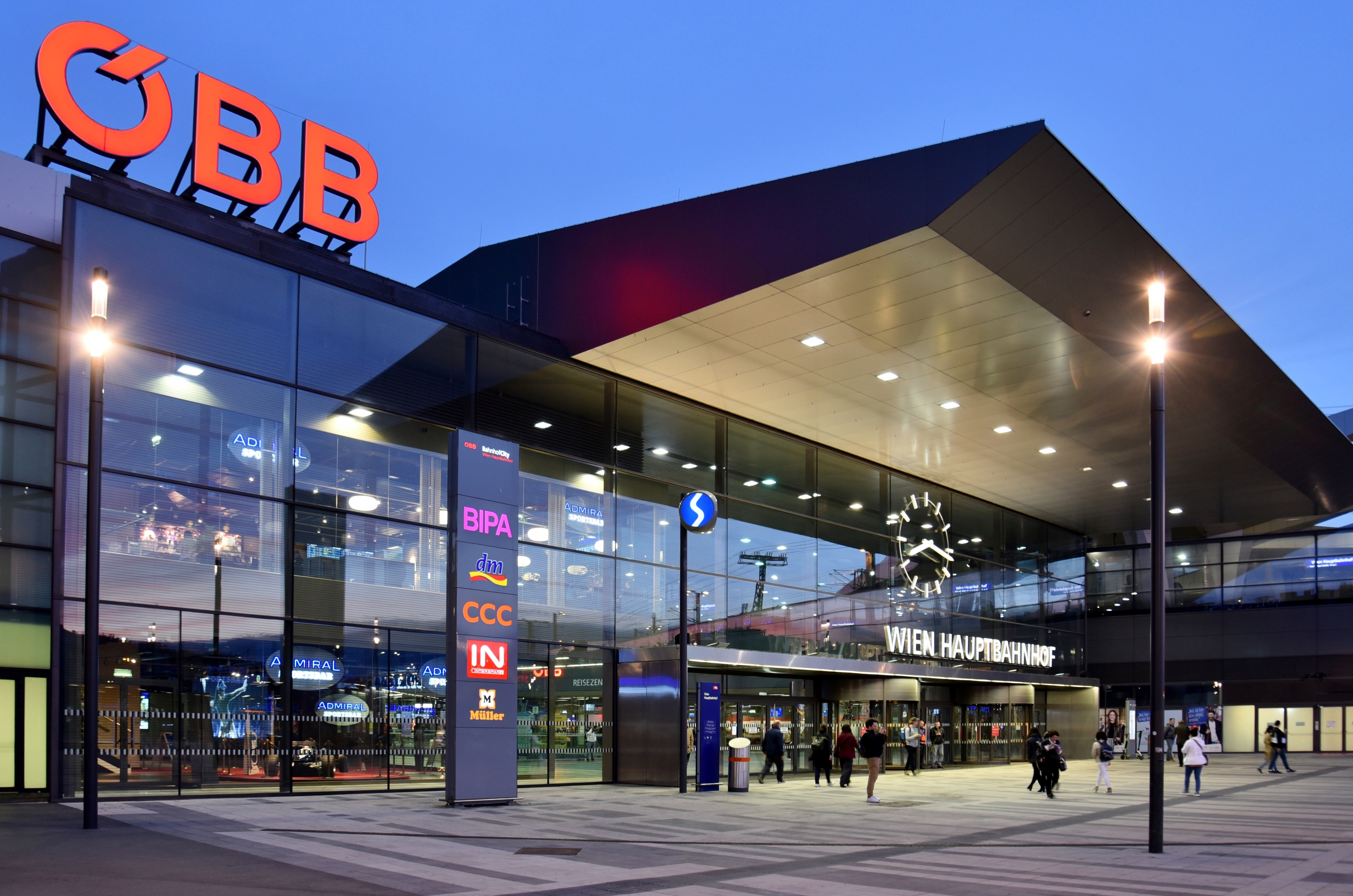
- The western entrance to the station concourse

General information
- Location: Favoritenstraße 51, Vienna; Austria
- Coordinates: 48°11′12″N 16°22′48″E
- Owner: Austrian Federal Railways (ÖBB)
- Lines: Eastern Railway; Laaer Ostbahn; Southern Railway; Verbindungsbahn
- Platforms: 12
- Tracks: 12 for ÖBB; 4 for loading cars (Wien Hauptbahnhof Autoreisezug); 2 for underground tram 2 for U-Bahn; 20 Total

Construction
- Structure type: at-grade
- Parking: yes

Other information
- IATA code: XWC
- Website: www.hauptbahnhof-wien.at (in German)

History
- Opened: December 2012; 13 years ago (partly operational); December 2015; 10 years ago (fully operational)

Passengers
- 268,000/day
Services
Preceding station	ÖBB	Following station
Wien Meidling towards Zürich HB	Railjet Express	Bratislava-Petržalka towards Bratislava hl.st.
Wien Meidling towards Zürich HB	Railjet Express	Hegyeshalom towards Budapest Keleti
Wien Meidling towards München Hbf	Railjet Express	Hegyeshalom towards Budapest Keleti
Wien Meidling towards München Hbf	Railjet Express	Terminus
Wien Meidling towards Zürich HB	Railjet Express	Vienna Airport Terminus
Wien Meidling towards Innsbruck Hbf	Railjet Express	Vienna Airport Terminus
Wien Meidling towards Bregenz	Railjet Express	Vienna Airport Terminus
Wien Meidling towards Graz Hbf	Railjet	Břeclav towards Berlin-Charlottenburg
Wien Meidling towards Graz Hbf	Railjet	Břeclav towards Praha hl.n.
Wien Meidling towards Villach Hbf	Railjet	Terminus
Wien Meidling towards Venezia Santa Lucia	Railjet	Terminus
Wien Meidling towards Salzburg Hbf	Railjet	Terminus
Wien Meidling towards Graz Hbf	Railjet	Vienna Airport Terminus
Wien Meidling towards Klagenfurt Hbf	Railjet	Vienna Airport Terminus
Terminus	EuroCity	Břeclav towards Katowice
Terminus	EuroCity	Břeclav towards Warszawa Wschodnia
Wien Meidling towards Graz Hbf	EuroCity	Břeclav towards Przemyśl Główny
Wien Meidling towards Trieste Centrale	EuroCity	Terminus
Terminus	EuroCity	Břeclav towards Gdynia Główna
Terminus	EuroCity	Hegyeshalom towards Budapest Keleti
Terminus	EuroCity	Hegyeshalom towards Cluj Napoca
Terminus	InterCity	Bratislava-Petrzalka towards Košice
Wien Meidling towards Stainach-Irdning	InterCity	Terminus
Wien Meidling towards Stuttgart Hbf	InterCity	Terminus
Wien Meidling towards Lienz	InterCity	Terminus
Wien Meidling towards Villach Hbf	InterCity	Terminus
Wiener Neustadt Hbf towards Graz Hbf	EuroNight	Břeclav towards Warszawa Wschodnia
Wien Meidling towards Zürich HB or Stuttgart Hbf	EuroNight	Hegyeshalom towards Budapest Keleti
Wien Meidling towards Roma Termini or La Spezia Centrale	Nightjet	Terminus
Wien Meidling towards Amsterdam Centraal or Hamburg-Altona	Nightjet	Terminus
Wien Meidling towards Bregenz	Nightjet	Terminus
Wiener Neustadt Hbf towards Graz Hbf	Nightjet	Břeclav towards Berlin-Charlottenburg or Warszawa Wschodnia
Wien Meidling towards Paris Est	Nightjet	Terminus
Wien Meidling towards Zürich HB or Venezia Santa Lucia	Nightjet	Terminus
Wien Meidling towards Bischofshofen	ÖBB-Urlaubsexpress Limited service	Terminus
Wien Matzleinsdorfer Platz towards Payerbach-Reichenau	REX 1	Wien Quartier Belvedere towards Břeclav
Wien Matzleinsdorfer Platz towards Wien Westbahnhof	REX 2	Wien Quartier Belvedere towards Laa an der Thaya
Wien Matzleinsdorfer Platz towards Wiener Neustadt Hbf	REX 3	Wien Quartier Belvedere towards Satov
Terminus	REX 6	Wien Grillgasse towards Bratislava-Petržalka
Terminus	REX 62	Wien Grillgasse towards Hegyeshalom
Terminus	REX 64	Wien Grillgasse towards Wulkaprodersdorf
Terminus	REX 8	Wien Simmering towards Bratislava hl.st.
Wien Meidling towards Payerbach-Reichenau	REX 9	Terminus
Terminus	R 81	Wien Simmering towards Marchegg
Terminus	R 95	Wien Grillgasse towards Wiener Neustadt Hbf
Preceding station	DB Fernverkehr	Following station
Wien Meidling towards Dortmund Hbf	ICE 91	Terminus
Preceding station	PKP Intercity	Following station
Wien Meidling towards München Hbf	EuroNight	Breclav towards Warszawa Wschodnia
Preceding station	Vienna S-Bahn	Following station
Wien Matzleinsdorfer Platz towards Wien Meidling	S1	Wien Quartier Belvedere towards Marchegg
Wien Matzleinsdorfer Platz towards Mödling	S2	Wien Quartier Belvedere towards Laa an der Thaya
Wien Matzleinsdorfer Platz towards Wiener Neustadt Hbf	S3	Wien Quartier Belvedere towards Hollabrunn
Wien Matzleinsdorfer Platz towards Wiener Neustadt Hbf	S4	Wien Quartier Belvedere towards Absdorf-Hippersdorf
Wien Meidling towards Wiener Neustadt Hbf	S60	Wien Grillgasse towards Bruck an der Leitha
Wien Meidling towards Wien Hütteldorf	S80	Wien Simmering towards Wien Aspern Nord
Location
- Location within Austria

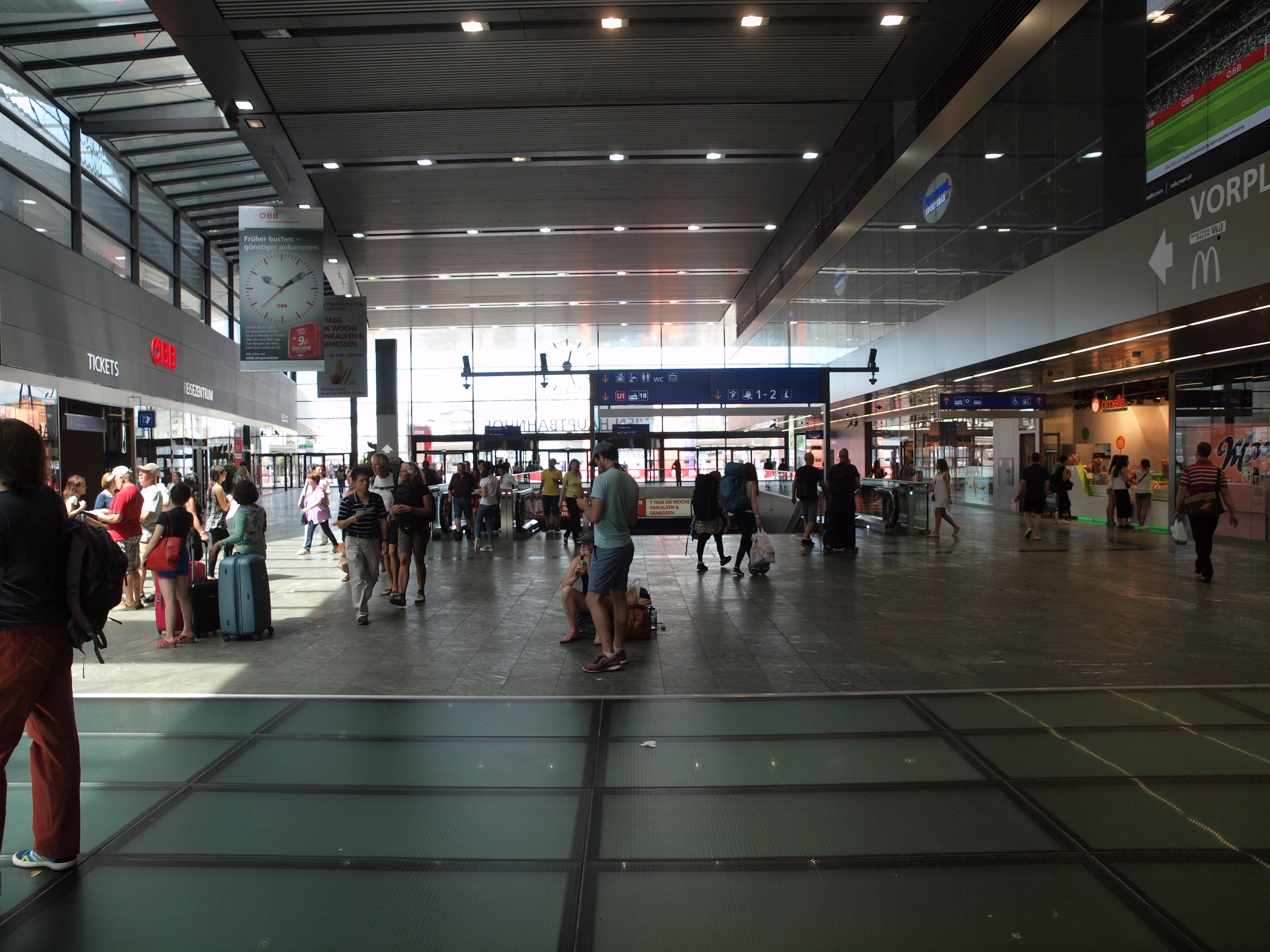
Interior of the station. June 2016

Wien Hauptbahnhof, Vienna Central Station or Vienna Main Station (Note: Also referred to in English as "Vienna Hauptbahnhof" and commonly abbreviated in German as "Wien Hbf".) is the main railway station in Vienna, Austria, located in the Favoriten district. It became fully operational in December 2015, linking major railway lines from the north, east, south and west, and replacing the old Wien Südbahnhof terminus. With 268,000 daily commuters it is Austria's busiest long-distance railway station. Aside from being voted "Austria's most beautiful railway station" (six times in total; five years in a row), it was also second in the ranking of "Top 10 Railway Stations for Passenger Convenience in Europe" by US-based lobby organization Consumer Choice Center.

== History ==
=== Background ===
During the 1990s, interest arose in the redevelopment of Vienna's railway stations, particularly the Südbahnhof and Ostbahnhof termini, which were at right-angles to one another. The concept of a new integrated station that served north–south and east–west routes, including three TEN corridors, to replace both of the existing stations, was mooted. Around this time, Zurich-based Theo Hotz Architects and Planners were awarded an initial design contract to develop a new station solution for the area. While the plans produced by Theo Hotz do not directly correspond with the subsequently-built structure, the architects were still responsible for a large proportion of the station that was later constructed, particularly the design for both the main concourse and the platforms.

The new station, known as Hauptbahnhof, has been designed as a single structure with through platforms, and is capable of handling more trains a day on much less space than its predecessors. It has direct links to the centre of Vienna via the U-Bahn network, while ÖBB state that the other principal stations in the city are to be reachable from the station within 30 minutes. The design of the new station also features extensive onsite retail opportunities, including a 20,000-square-metre (220,000 sq ft) shopping centre positioned below track level, which accommodate for around 100 shops and restaurants, as well as an on-site underground car park with spaces for up to 600 cars and 1,110 bicycles.

A major benefit of the scheme has been the release of land within the city centre which had previously been occupied by the two former termini. Plans for its reuse were incorporated into the development of the new station and it has become a major urban development in its own right to include various office, retail and educational facilities. Significant investment has been attracted from several sources. Specifically, the new headquarters for Erste Group Bank AG and ÖBB's corporate headquarters have both been built on this site, along with the new Sonnwendviertel residential district of 5,000 innercity apartments, accommodating up to 13,000 people.

On 15 December 2006, the city council of Vienna gave its consent to the construction of a new station in the city; at the time, the city authorities had assessed the project's cost to be around 850 million euros. An environmental assessment for the rail infrastructure begun during the following year; the design reportedly incorporated around 100 km (62 mi) of new track, as well as around 300 switches and crossing. The design of the station included measures to make it both energy-efficient and environmentally friendly; features such as integrated CO_{2}-controlled ventilation and geothermal energy systems have been incorporated, while both the windows and walls are furnished with soundproofing.

=== Construction ===
During June 2007, construction work formally commenced in the form of preliminary works, such as the remodelling of the existing S-Bahn station Südtiroler Platz. In 2008, the S-Bahn and the U-Bahn stations at Südtiroler Platz were connected to one another, while the Südbahnhof was demolished, a process which took until 2010 to complete. The bulk of Südbahnhof's services (platforms 11–19) were closed with the timetable change of 13 December 2009; during this transition period, Wien Meidling railway station temporarily took on many of Südbahnhof's services until the new station could be completed.

During 2009, ÖBB Infrastruktur awarded a €220 million contract for the station's construction to a consortium led by Strabag; at this point, it was intended for the first stage of the project to have been completed by 2013, while the finalisation of the overall project was due to occur during 2015. The railway infrastructure for the project was largely built by a joint venture between Arge Östu-Stettin and HOCHTIEF Construction, while the station's diamond-shaped roof was installed by UNGER Steel. The total cost of building the new station has been stated to have been around €987 million; it was financed via ÖBB, the city authorities, the European Union, and property development opportunities.

During April 2010, the construction programme entered into full swing. That year, work began on building the rail infrastructure at the station. In excess of 45,000 cubic metres (1,600,000 cu ft) of concrete was used in the construction of the structure's baseplate as well as the entrance to the underground garage. By the end of 2010, both the bridge support structures and the platforms had been completed. In 2011, construction of office buildings in the Belvedere district commenced. During the construction process, a wooden viewing platform, known as the Bahnorama, was erected to the west of the new station building. According to its planners, RAHM Architects, the viewing platform was the highest walkable wooden tower in Europe at the time, measuring 66 metres from base to tip. The structure was composed of around 150 tonnes of spruce timber, reinforced with steel elements, and assembled from four pre-fabricated modules which were lifted into place using cranes.

=== Opening ===
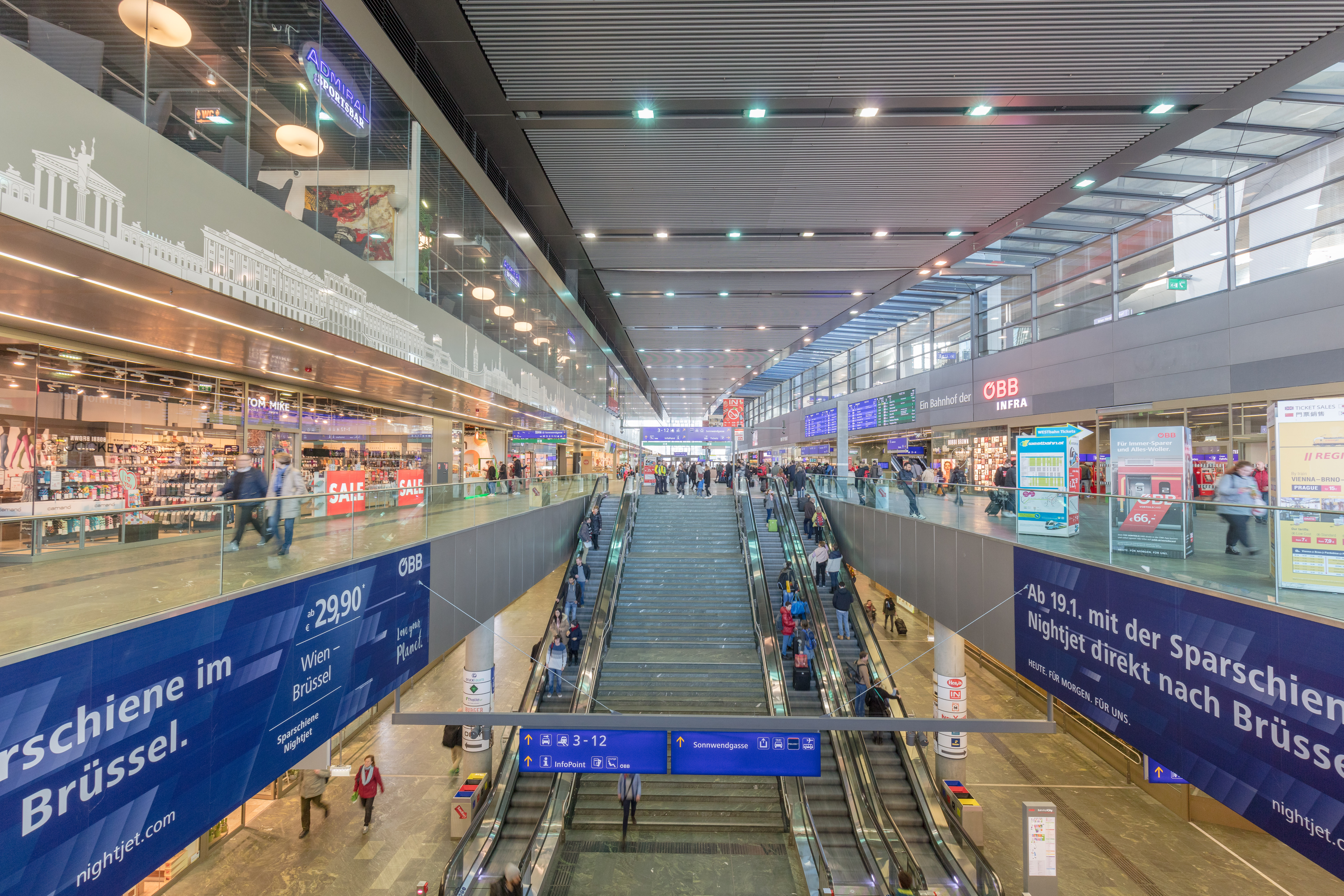
View of the main hall. February 2020

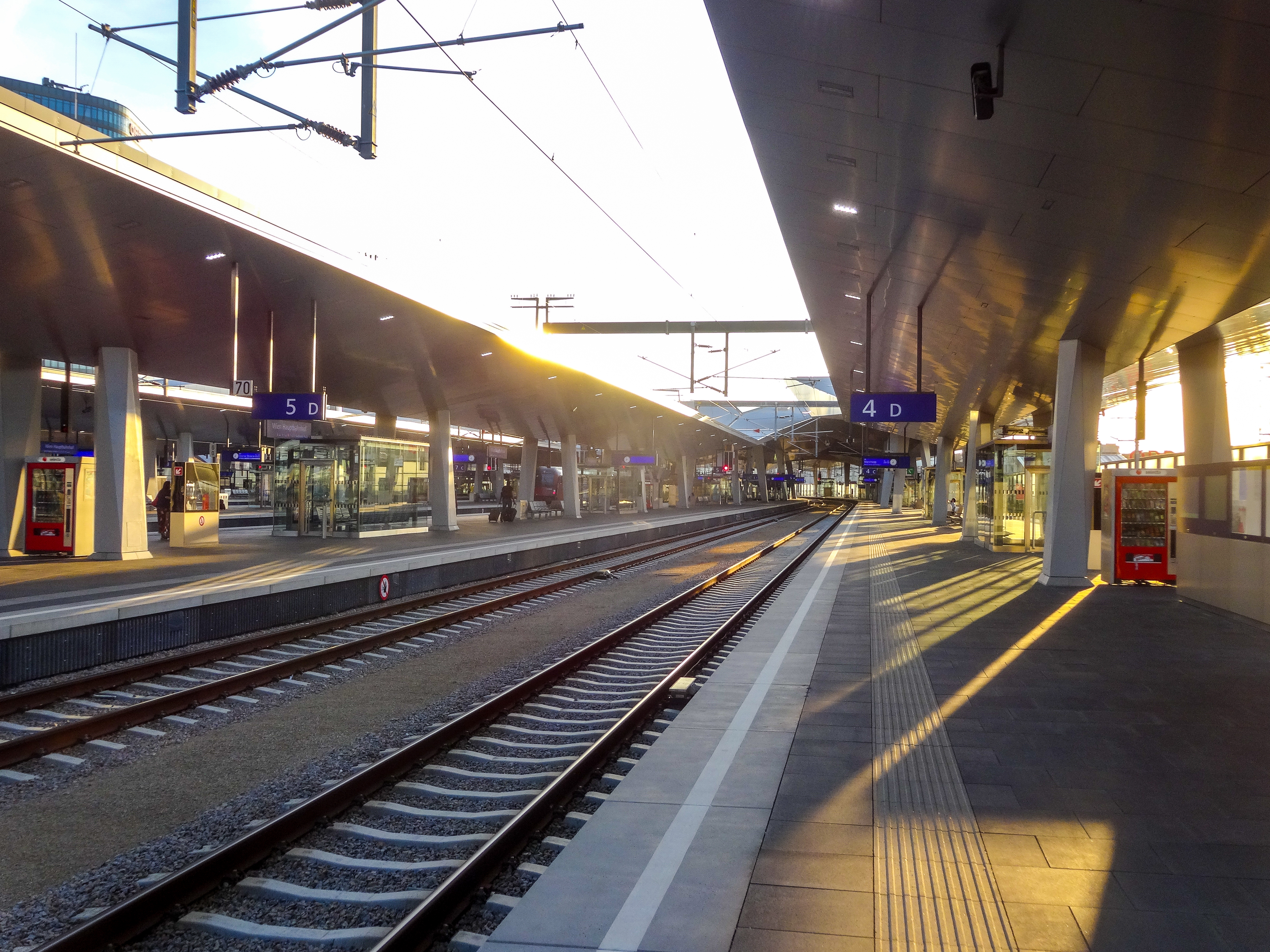
View to 4th and 5th platforms of Vienna main station at sunset. June 2016

On 6 August 2012, trains began passing through the new Hauptbahhof station without stopping. During December 2012, the station attained a partial operational status, coinciding with a timetable shakeup on 9 December and the induction of some new alignments; as a result, both regional and S-Bahn services began using platforms 9–12, while long-distance trains continued to not stop at the station.

On the morning of 10 October 2014, Wien Hauptbahnhof was formally inaugurated in a ceremony held at the station, officiated by Austrian President Heinz Fischer. At one point, it was expected that the Hauptbahnhof would be able to fully open during December 2014, however delays were encountered, attributed to difficulties in the completion of a key footbridge, which meant the station was not fully operational until December 2015. Upon attaining full operational status, the station has been anticipated to handle 145,000 passengers and 1,000 trains per day. In terms of its mainline connection, the new station serves as a key meeting point in Vienna for four individual major railway lines; it also provided access to other local services including the Vienna S-Bahn, a tramway and several bus lines.

The station has a total of five island platforms, each with 2 sides, for a total of 10 platforms. These five islands are complete with striking canopies, measuring roughly 210 metres in length and between 6 and 15 metres (20 and 49 ft) in height; the canopies are built on top of a welded and bolted steel framework, covered by Alucobond composite panels, and supported at 38 metres (125 ft) intervals by transverse solid concrete frames, which are clad in sheet steel. To facilitate a high rate of pedestrian movement across the station, a total of 29 escalators and 14 elevators are present to provide full step-free access to all areas. Passengers are provided with various onsite amenities, along with 800 seats spread throughout the station, while free Wi-Fi is available in certain designated areas. A dedicated 'Kids Corner' facility is present for the benefit of families with younger passengers. A Lion of St Mark sculpture from the former Südbahnhof is also present, which symbolises the restoration of the route through to Venezia, Italy.

The new station offers significantly improved connectivity, principally focused upon international routes. By moving the main access to Südtiroler Platz, the new station is better connected to the Vienna U-Bahn system, and is also accessible by Vienna S-Bahn, tram and bus lines. The Südtiroler Platz S-Bahn station was renamed Wien Hauptbahnhof (platforms 1 and 2) in December 2012.

== Train services ==
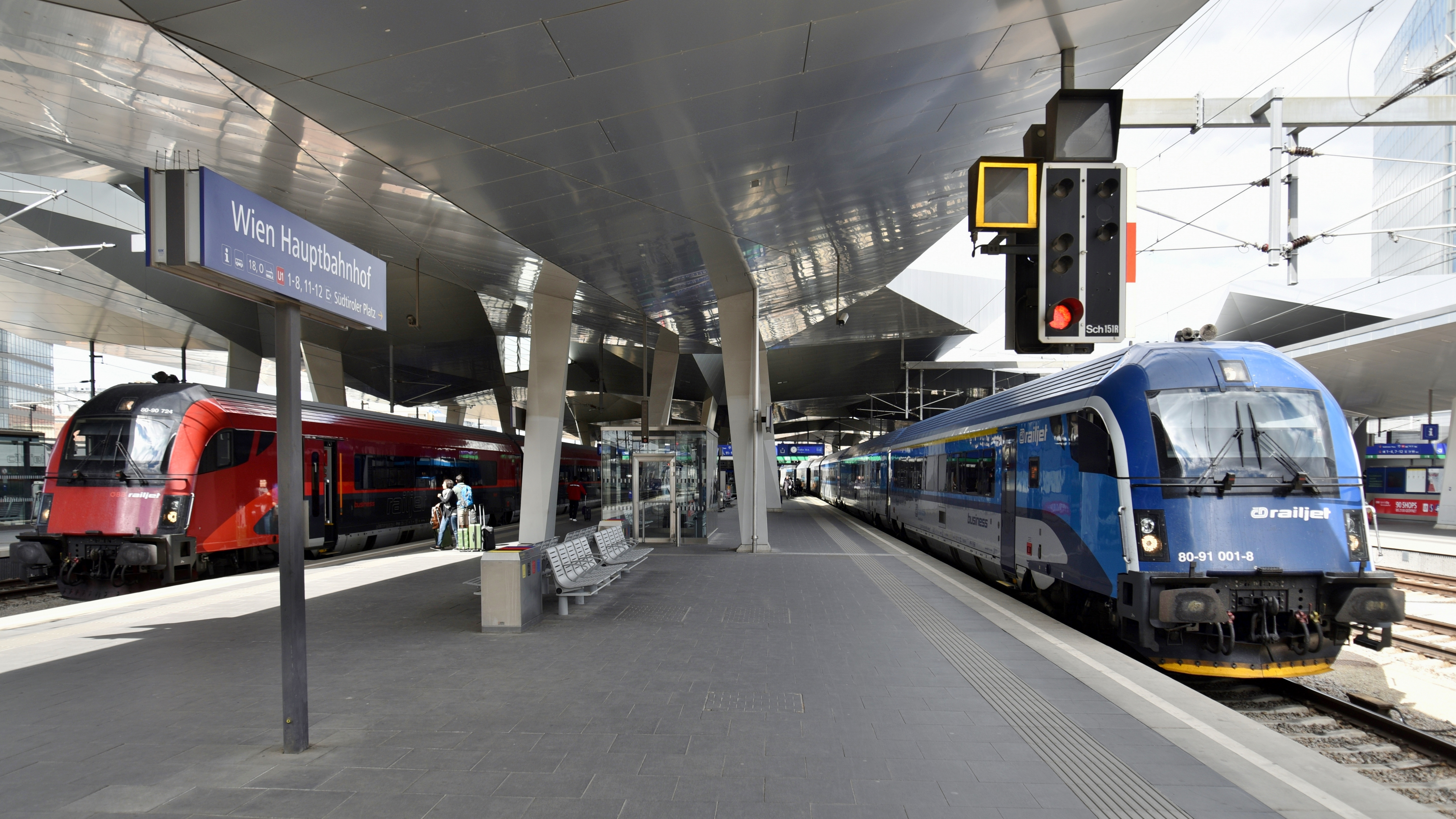
Railjet trains at Wien Hauptbahnhof in 2019

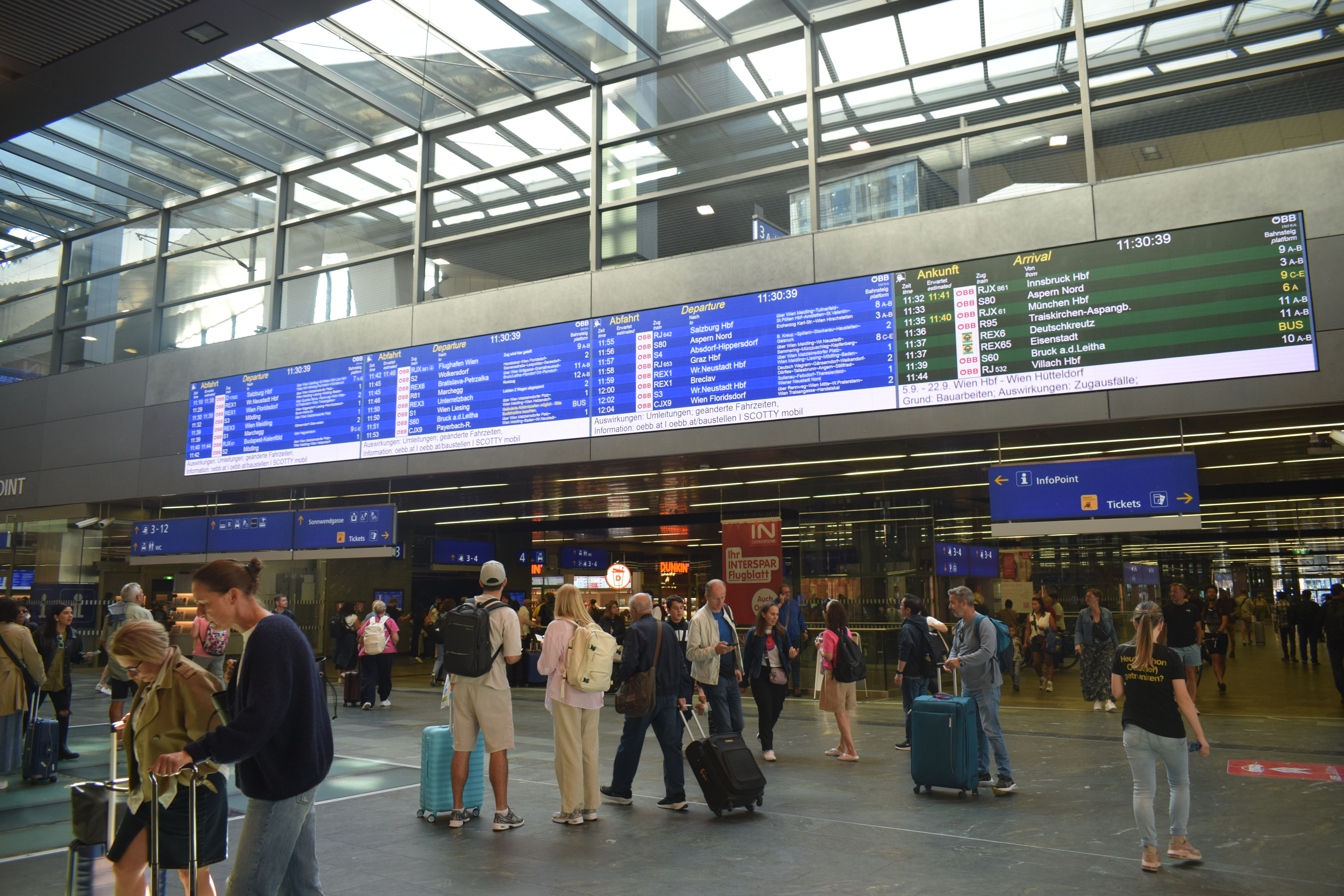
A departure board at Wien Hauptbahnhof

The station is served by the following services:

- Intercity Express services (ICE) Hamburg - Hanover - Kassel - Nürnberg - Passau - Linz - St Pölten - Vienna
- Intercity Express services (ICE) Dortmund - Essen - Düsseldorf - Cologne - Koblenz - Frankfurt - Nürnberg - Passau - Linz - St Pölten - Vienna
- Intercity Express services (ICE) Berlin - Halle - Erfurt - Coburg - Nürnberg - Passau - Linz - St Pölten - Vienna
- Railjet services (RJ) Zurich - (Bregenz -) Innsbruck - Salzburg - Linz - St Pölten - Vienna - (Vienna International Airport) - Győr - Budapest
- Railjet services (RJ) (Frankfurt - Stuttgart -) Munich - Salzburg - Linz - St Pölten - Vienna - Győr - Budapest
- Railjet services (RJ) Frankfurt - Stuttgart - Ulm - Friedrichshafen - Lindau-Reutin - Bregenz - Innsbruck - Salzburg - Linz - St Pölten - Vienna (- Vienna International Airport)
- Railjet services (RJ) Graz - Vienna (- Vienna International Airport) - Breclav - Brno - Pardubice - Prague - Dresden - Berlin
- Railjet services (RJ) Villach - Klagenfurt - Vienna (- Vienna International Airport)
- Railjet services (RJ) Vienna - Klagenfurt - Villach - Udine - Treviso - Venice
- Railjet Express services (RJX) Vienna - St Pölten - Linz - Salzburg - (Innsbruck - Bregenz - Zürich)/(Munich)
- EuroCity services Vienna - Győr - Budapest - Kiskunmajsa - Novi Sad - Belgrade
- EuroCity services Vienna - Győr - Budapest - Szolnok - Oradea - Cluj-Napoca
- EuroCity services Vienna - Győr - Budapest - Debrecen - Zahony ( - Kyiv [Sleeping Cars])
- EuroCity services Vienna - Győr - Budapest
- EuroCity services Vienna - Breclav - Prerov - Ostrava - Bohumín - Katowice - Warsaw (- Gdansk - Gdynia)
- EuroCity services Vienna - Graz - Maribor - Ljubljana (- Trieste)
- EuroCity services Vienna - Graz - Maribor - Zagreb
- Nightjet services Vienna - Ostrava - Wroclaw - Frankfurt/Oder - Berlin
- Nightjet services Vienna - Klagenfurt - Villach - Bologna - Florence - Rome
- Nightjet services Vienna - Klagenfurt - Villach - Padova - Verona - Milan
- Nightjet services Vienna - Linz - Salzburg - Villach - Udine - Venice
- Nightjet services Vienna - Klagenfurt - Villach - Bologna - Florence - Pisa - Livorno
- Nightjet services Vienna - Innsbruck - Feldkirch - Buchs - Zurich
- Nightjet services Vienna - Linz - Hanover - Hamburg
- Nightjet services Vienna - Linz - Frankfurt - Koblenz - Cologne - Düsseldorf (- Amsterdam / Brussels)
- Nightjet services Vienna - Innsbruck - Feldkirch - Bregenz
- Nightjet services Vienna - Linz - Salzburg - Munich Ost - Paris Est
- EuroNight services Zurich - Buchs - Feldkirch - Innsbruck - Vienna - Budapest
- EuroNight services Stuttgart - Munich - Salzburg - Linz - Vienna - Budapest
- EuroNight services Vienna - Breclav - Prerov - Ostrava - Bohumín - Katowice - Warsaw / Krakow
- EuroNight services Vienna - Kosice
- EuroNight services Bratislava - Vienna - Graz - Maribor - Zagreb - Split
- InterRegio Night (Romanian Railways) Vienna - Győr - Budapest - Lokoshaza - Arad - Sighişoara - Braşov - Bucharest
- Regiojet Vienna - Breclav - Brno - Pardubice - Prague

	Wien Meidling	– Wien Hauptbahnhof (platform 1–2)	– Wien Floridsdorf – Gänserndorf
	Mödling – Wien Meidling	– Wien Hauptbahnhof (platform 1–2)	– Wien Floridsdorf – Wolkersdorf – Mistelbach – Laa an der Thaya
/	Wiener Neustadt Hbf – Baden – Mödling – Wien Meidling	– Wien Hauptbahnhof (platform 1–2)	– Wien Floridsdorf – Stockerau – Hollabrunn (S3)/Absdorf-Hippersdorf (S4)
	Wiener Neustadt Hbf – Ebenfurth – Wien Meidling	– Wien Hauptbahnhof (platform 3–12)	– Bruck an der Leitha
	Wien Erzherzog-Karl-Straße – Wien Stadlau - Wien Simmering	– Wien Hauptbahnhof (platform 3–12)	– Wien Meidling – Wien Hütteldorf – Unter Purkersdorf
R	to Deutschkreutz, Bratislava, Marchegg, Pamhagen, Wulkaprodersdorf, Győr, Payerbach-Reichenau, Břeclav, Znojmo and Wiener Neustadt Hauptbahnhof

== Local public transport ==
The station is served by the following municipal public transport services:

- U-Bahn:
- Tram: 18, D, O
- Bus: 13A, 69A N66 VAL Flixbus

Tram D is a small walk from the main entrance and can be accessed from section E of platforms 3 to 12. The D station is called "Hauptbahnhof Ost".

== Construction ==
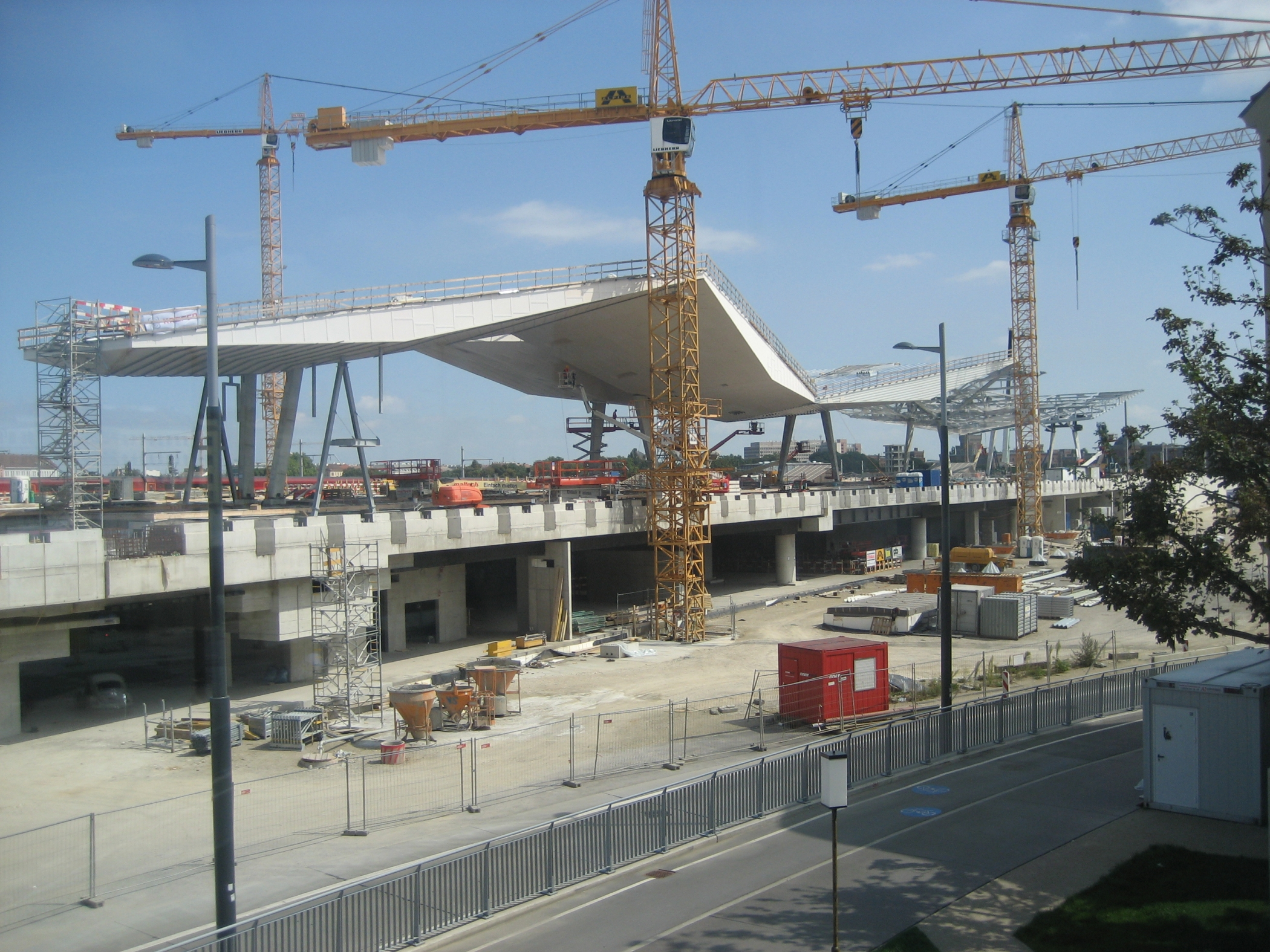
Started in 2011

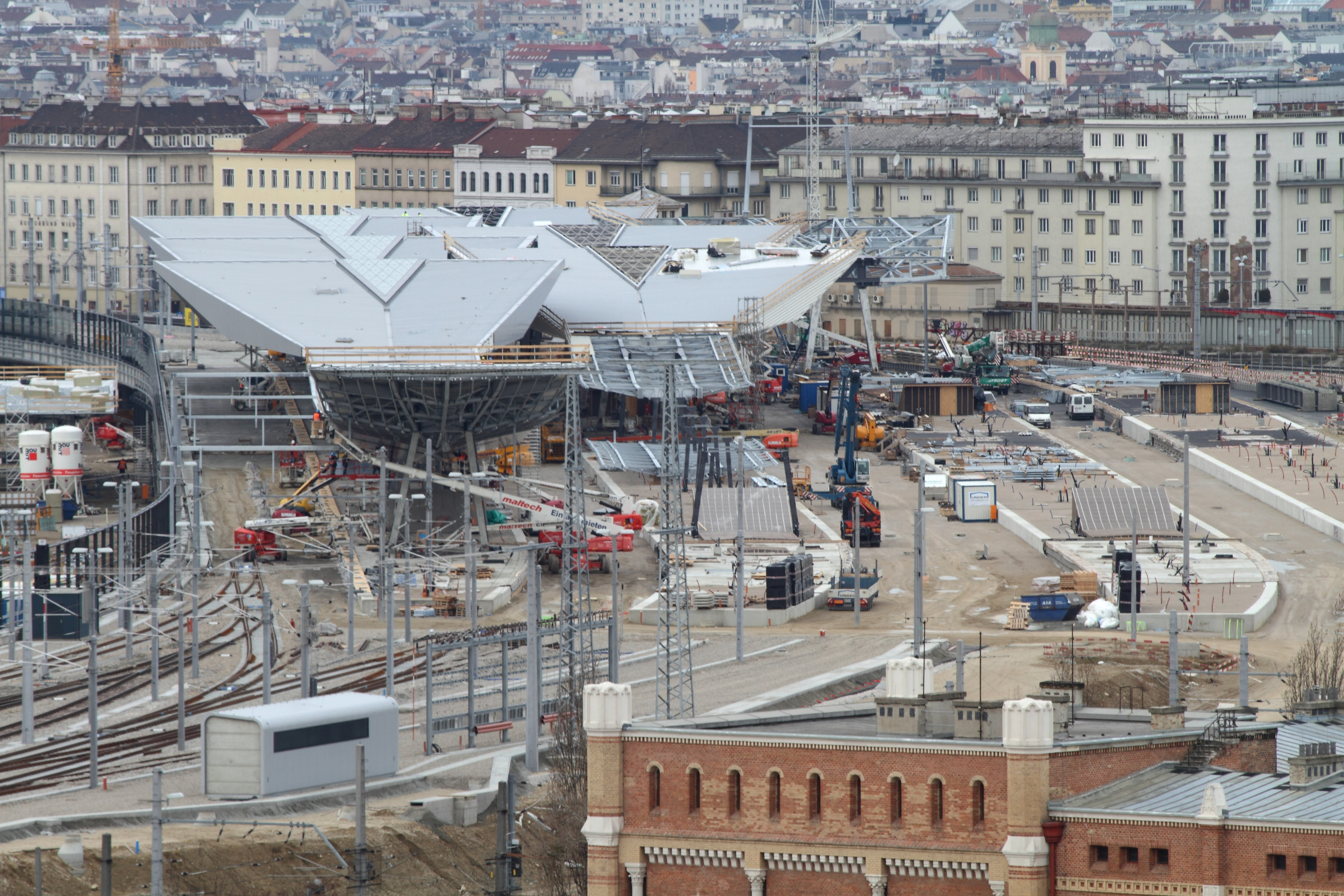
In January 2012

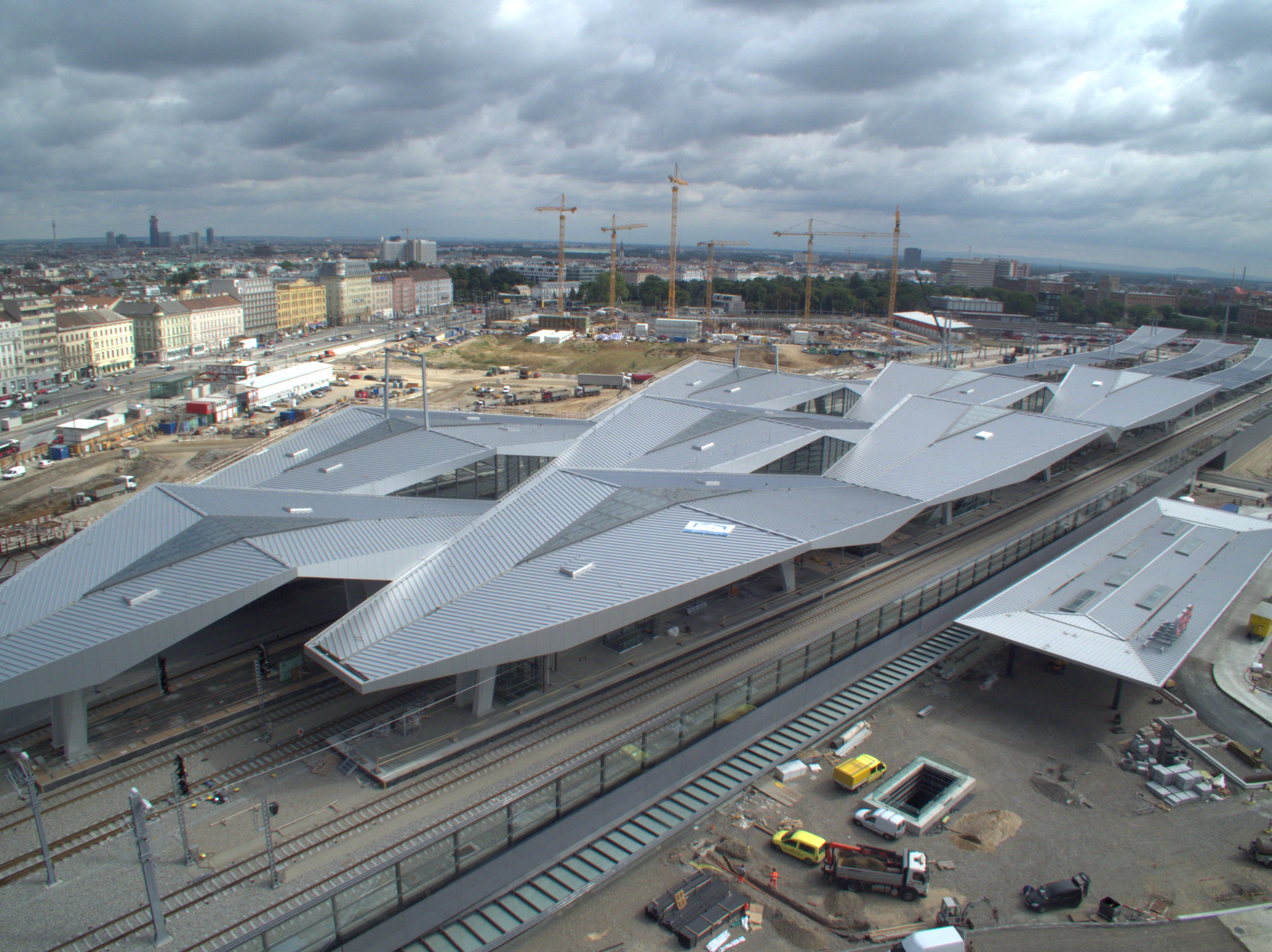
In August 2012

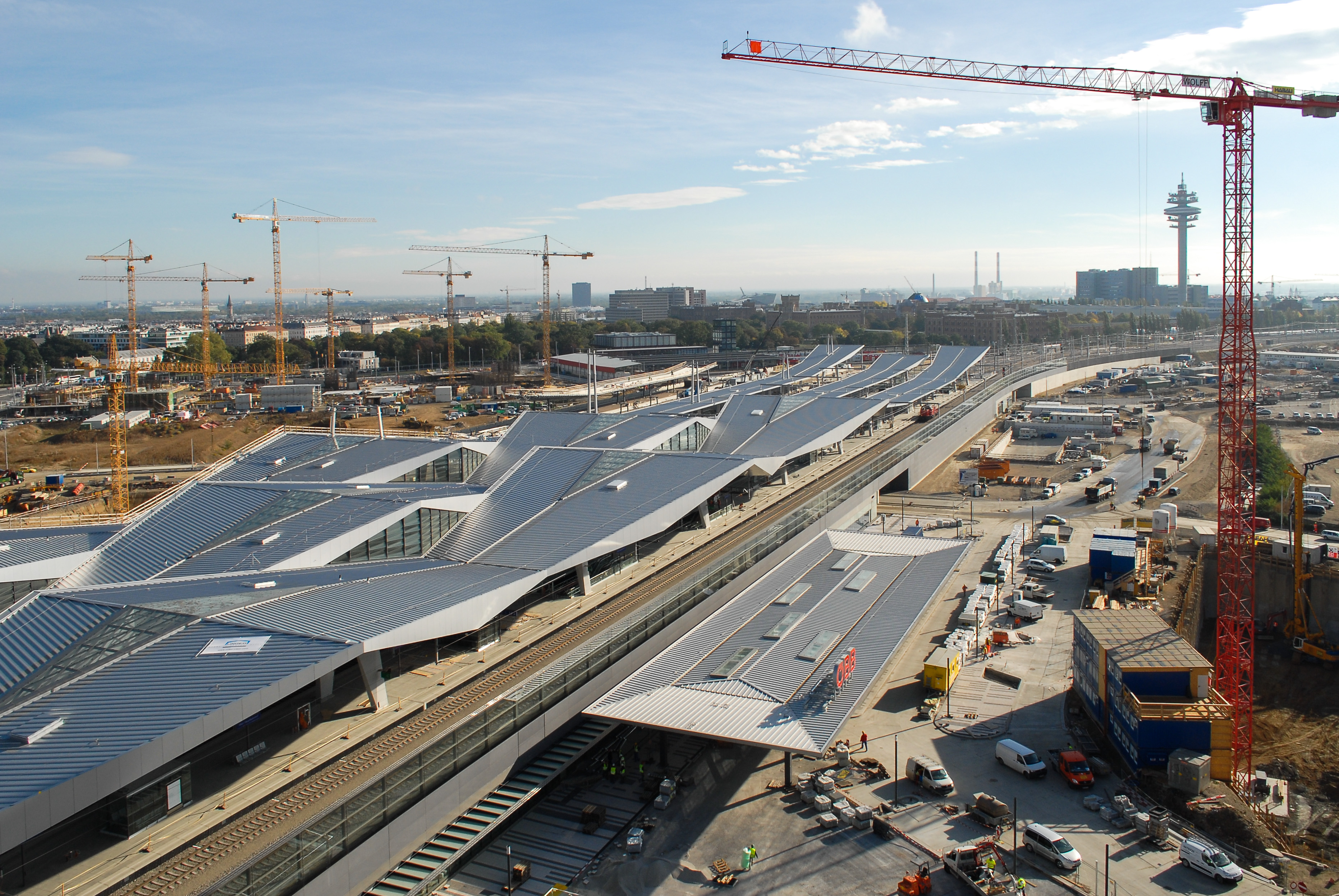
In October 2012

== See also ==
- Rail transport in Austria
- Wien Westbahnhof
- Wien Südbahnhof
