= Wien Aspern Nord railway station =

Railway station in Vienna, Austria

Wien Aspern Nord
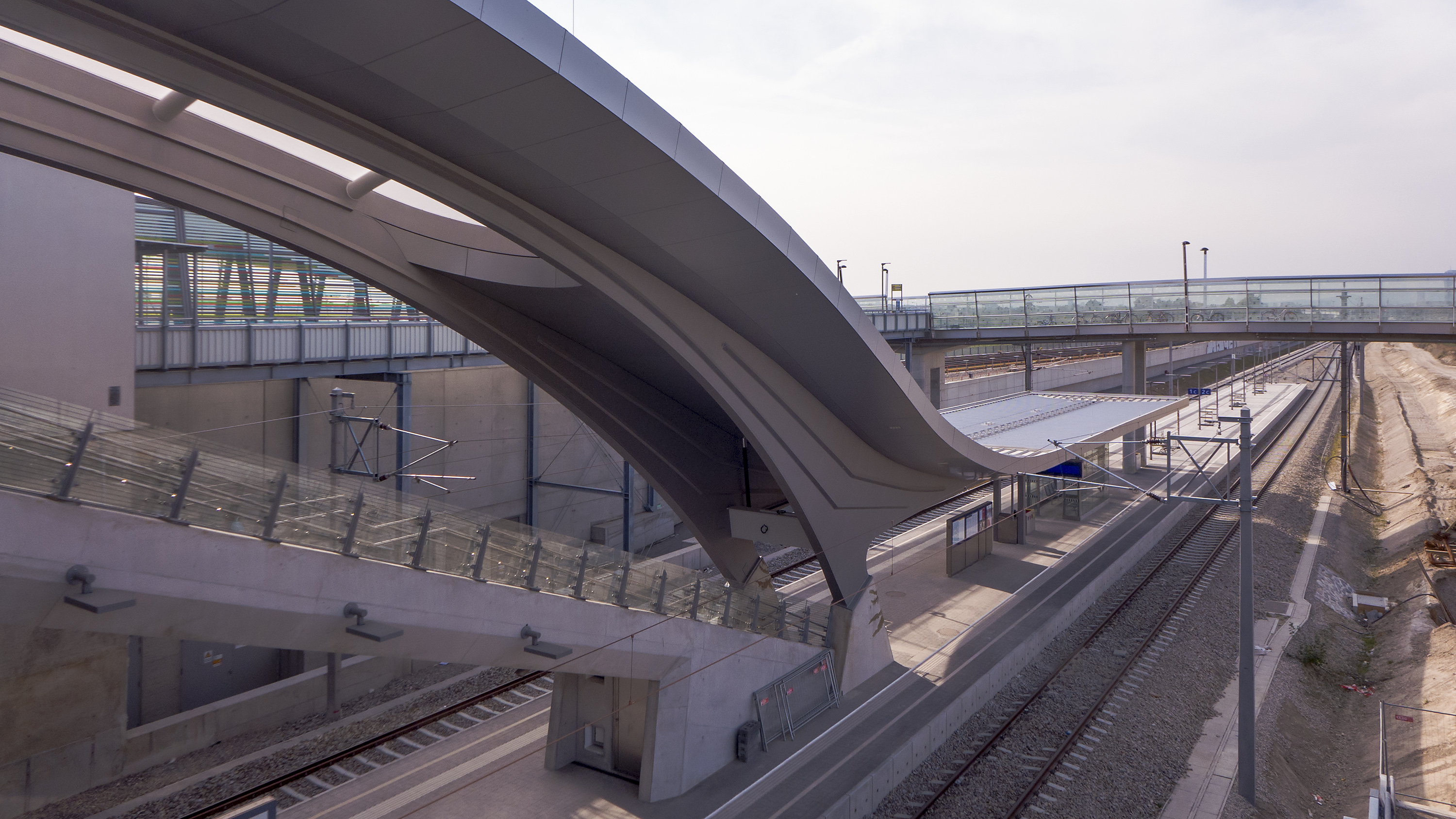
- The station platforms in 2018

General information
- Location: Vienna; Austria
- Coordinates: 48°14′05″N 16°30′16″E
- Owner: ÖBB
- Line: Marchegger Ostbahn
- Platforms: 1 island platform
- Tracks: 2
- Train operators: ÖBB
- Connections: Bus

Services
Preceding station	ÖBB	Following station
Wien Stadlau towards Wien Hbf	REX 8	Siebenbrunn-Leopoldsdorf towards Bratislava hl.st.
Wien Hirschstetten towards Wien Hbf	R 81	Raasdorf towards Marchegg
Preceding station	Vienna S-Bahn	Following station
Wien Hirschstetten towards Wien Hütteldorf	S80	Terminus
Location

Wien Aspern Nord is a railway station serving Donaustadt, the twenty-second district of Vienna. It is the eastern terminus of the Vienna S-Bahn line S80 and adjacent to the Aspern Nord U-Bahn station.

== Services ==
As of the December 2020 timetable change, the following services stop at Wien Aspern Nord:

- REX: hourly service between Wien Hauptbahnhof and Bratislava.
- Regionalzug (R): hourly service between Wien Hauptbahnhof and Marchegg.
- Vienna S-Bahn S80: half-hourly service to Wien Hütteldorf.
