= Marchegg railway station =

Railway station in Marchegg, Austria

Marchegg
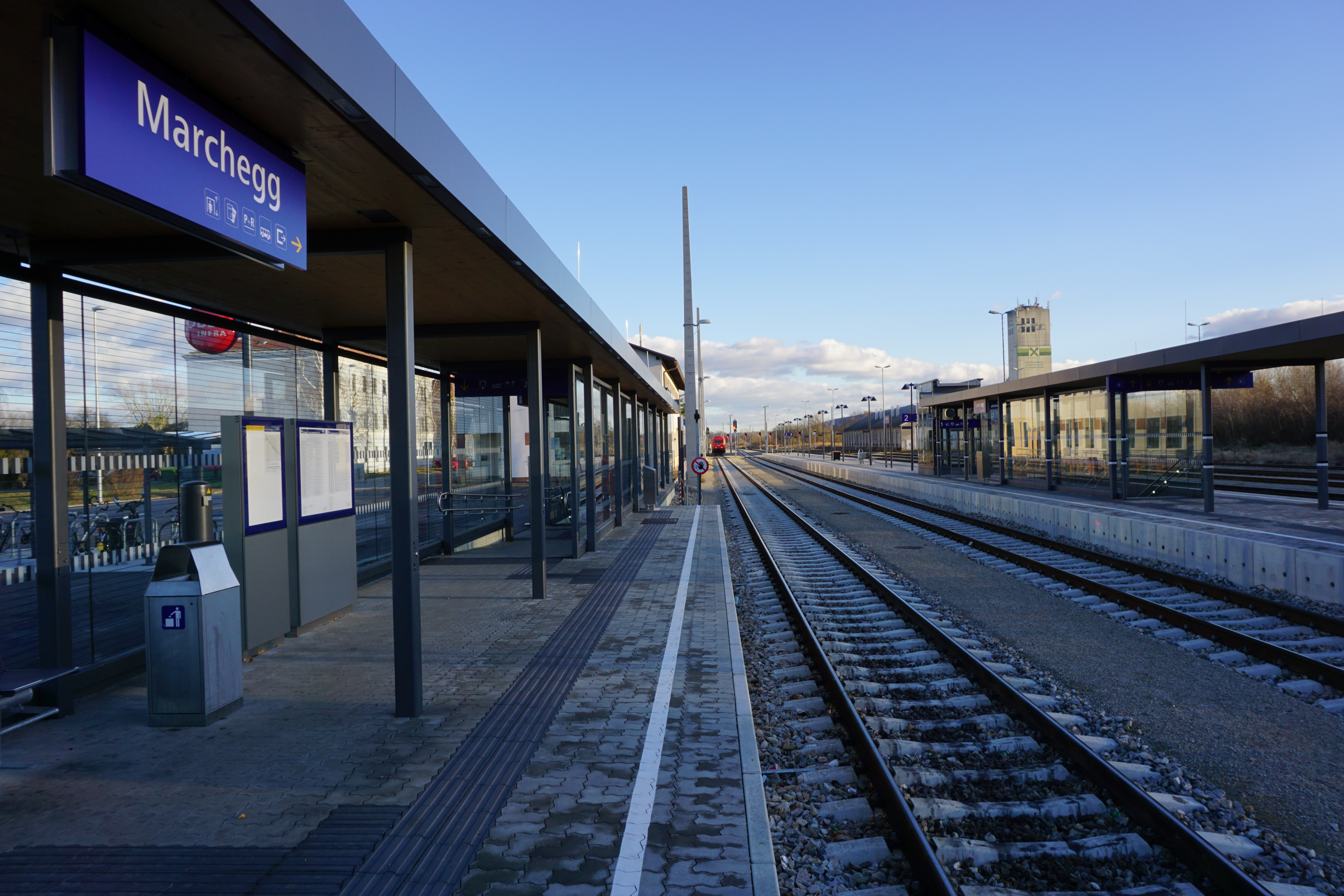
- The station in 2016, after renovation

General information
- Location: Marchegg; Austria
- Coordinates: 48°15′00″N 16°55′03″E
- Lines: Marchegger Ostbahn; Gänserndorf–Marchegg
- Distance: 35.6 kilometres (22.1 mi) from Wien Stadlau; 49.5 kilometres (30.8 mi) from Wien Praterstern
- Train operators: ÖBB

Construction
- Accessible: Yes

Services
| Preceding station | ÖBB | Following station |
|---|---|---|
| Schönfeld-Lassee towards Wien Hbf | REX 8 | Devínska Nová Ves towards Bratislava hl.st. |
| Breitensee NÖ towards Wien Hbf | R 81 | Terminus |
| Preceding station | Vienna S-Bahn | Following station |
| Oberweiden towards Wien Meidling | S1 | Terminus |
Location

Marchegg railway station (German: Bahnhof Marchegg) is a railway station in the town of Marchegg, in the Austrian state of Lower Austria. It is located at the junction of the Marchegger Ostbahn and Gänserndorf–Marchegg railway line. It is the last station in Austria before the Austrian–Slovak border.

== History ==
The station was substantially renovated in 2015 for improved physical accessibility including barrier-free access, elevators, and high-level platforms. The renovation also added a 120-space park and ride lot. The Marchegger Ostbahn, although the most direct route between Vienna and Bratislava, was not electrified until December 2022. ÖBB is also double-tracking the route.

== Services ==
As of the December 2022 timetable change, the following services stop at Marchegg:

- REX 8: hourly service between Wien Hauptbahnhof and Bratislava main.
- R 81: hourly service to Wien Hauptbahnhof.
- Vienna S-Bahn S1: hourly service to Wien Meidling.

== See also ==
- Rail transport in Austria
