= Regionalzug =

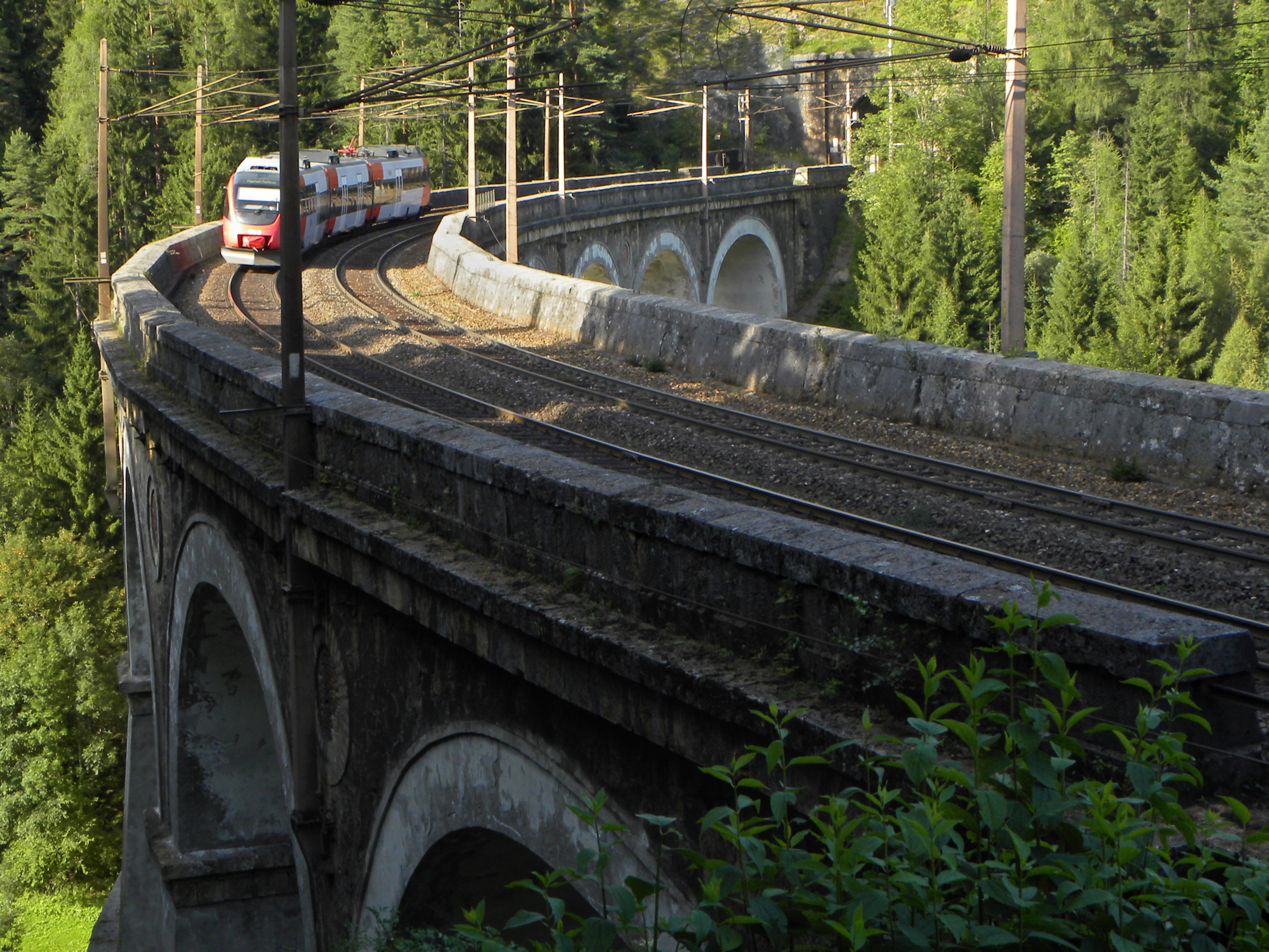
A regional train on the Semmering railway in 2013

Regionalzug (German: [ʁeɡi̯oˈnaːlˌt͡suːk]; lit. 'Regional train'), abbreviated as R (and numbered), is a type of local passenger train in Austria.

In general, a Regionalzug service will make all station stops, as opposed to trains such as the Regional-Express (REX). The Austrian Regionalzug is similar to the Regionalbahn (RB) in Germany and Regio (R) in Switzerland, respectively. S-Bahn (S) trains have a similar stopping pattern, but are centered around cities.

== See also ==
- Rail transport in Austria
- Train categories in Europe
