= Neukirchen-Gampern railway station =

Railway station in Upper Austria

Neukirchen-Gampern

General information
- Location: 4851 Gampern; Austria
- Coordinates: 48°01′12″N 13°32′59″E
- Owner: ÖBB
- Operator: ÖBB
- Line: Western Railway

Services
Preceding station	ÖBB	Following station
Redl-Zipf towards Freilassing	R 2	Timelkam towards Linz Hbf
Location
- Location within Austria

Neukirchen-Gampern (German: Bahnhof Neukirchen-Gampern) is a small railway station near the town of Neukirchen an der Vöckla, Upper Austria, Austria. The train services are operated by ÖBB. The station receives a limited service, in the early morning and late evening.

== Train services ==
The station is served by the following services:

Train Type	Operator	Route
Regional	ÖBB	Salzburg Taxham Europark - Salzburg Hbf - Steindorf bei Straßwalchen - Neukirchen-Gampern - Vöcklabruck - Attnang-Puchheim - Wels Hbf - Linz Hbf
Regional	ÖBB	Freilassing - Salzburg Hbf - Steindorf bei Straßwalchen - Neukirchen-Gampern - Vöcklabruck - Attnang-Puchheim - Wels Hbf - Linz Hbf
