= Vöcklamarkt railway station =

Railway station in Upper Austria

Vöcklamarkt
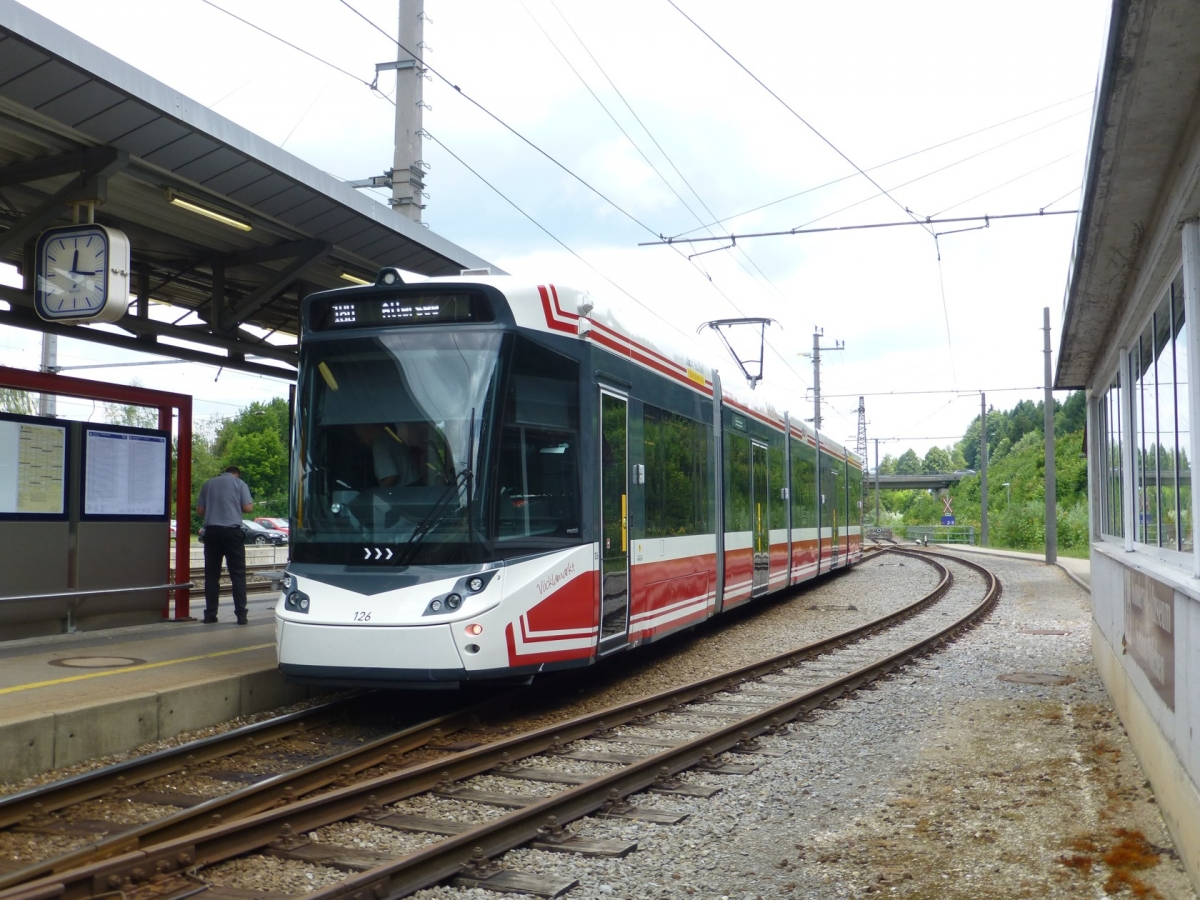
- Stern & Hafferl operated Stadler Tramlink on the metre gauge Atterseebahn in the Vöcklamarkt station. (2017)

General information
- Location: Bahnhofstrasse 36; 4870 Vöcklamarkt; Austria
- Coordinates: 47°59′54″N 13°29′22″E
- Owner: Austrian Federal Railways (ÖBB)
- Operator: ÖBB; Stern & Hafferl Verkehr
- Lines: Western Railway; Vöcklamarkt–Attersee railway
- Distance: 264.1 kilometres (164.1 mi) from Wien Westbahnhof; 13.3 kilometres (8.3 mi) from Attersee
- Platforms: 5

Services
Preceding station	ÖBB	Following station
Frankenmarkt towards Freilassing	R 2	Redl-Zipf towards Linz Hbf
Preceding station	Stern und Hafferl Verkehr	Following station
Terminus	Regionalzug	Haid bei Vöcklamarkt towards Attersee
Location
- Location within Austria

Vöcklamarkt railway station (German: Bahnhof Vöcklamarkt) is a railway station in the town of Vöcklamarkt, Austria, EU. The train services are operated by ÖBB and Stern & Hafferl. The ÖBB station has two passing tracks for express and freight trains.

The station is an intermediate stop on the Western Railway and the northern terminus of the Atterseebahn.

== Train services ==
The station is served by the following services:

Train Type	Operator	Route
Regional	ÖBB	Salzburg Taxham Europark - Salzburg Hbf - Steindorf bei Straßwalchen - Vöcklamarkt - Vöcklabruck - Wels Hbf - Linz Hbf
Regional	Stern und Hafferl	Vöcklamarkt - St.Georgen im Attergau - Attersee
