= Timelkam railway station =

Railway station in Upper Austria

Timelkam
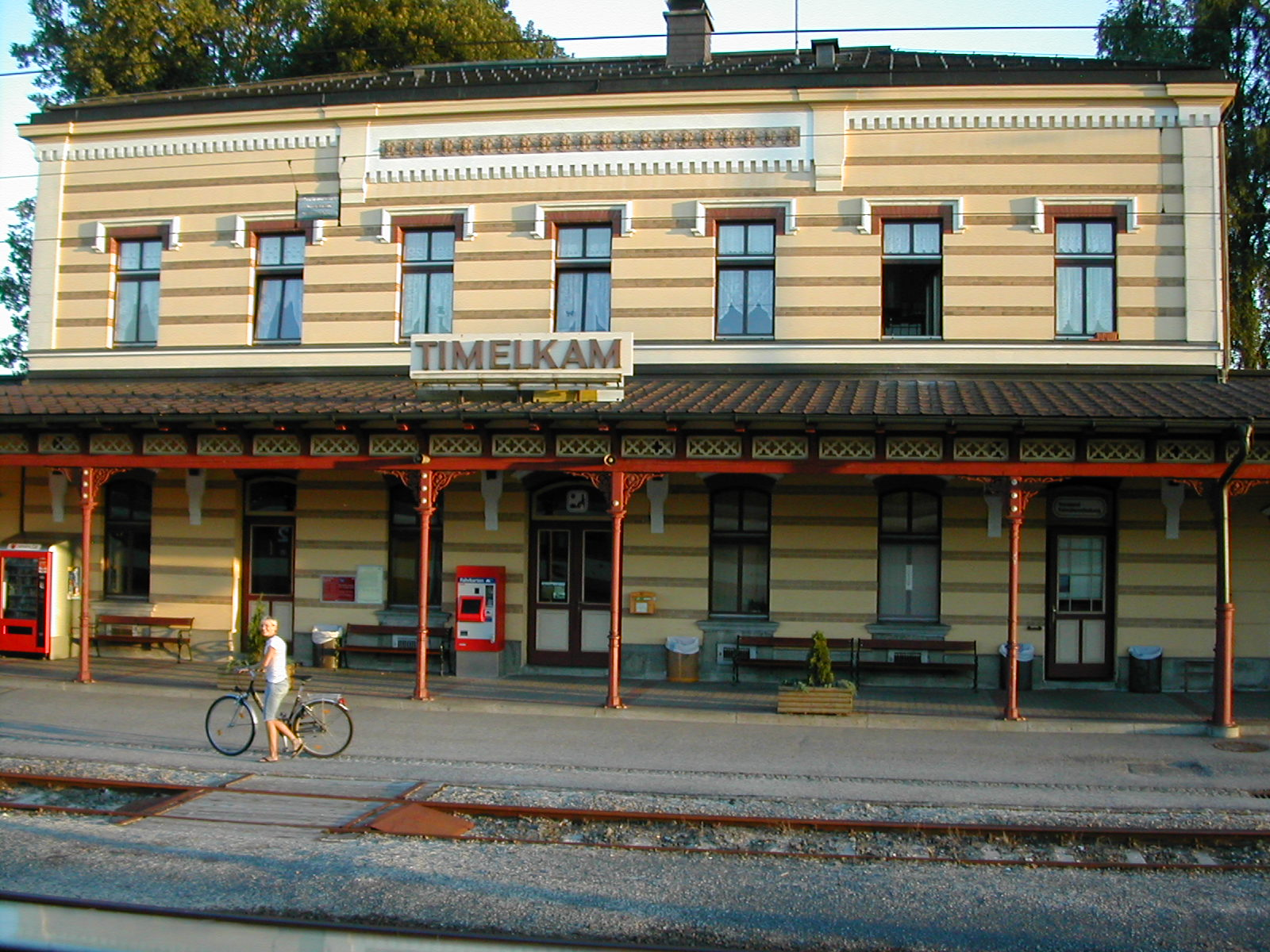
- Timelkam railway station

General information
- Location: Leidern 17; 4850 Timelkam; Austria
- Coordinates: 48°00′29″N 13°35′44″E
- Owner: ÖBB
- Operator: ÖBB
- Line: Western Railway

Services
| Preceding station | ÖBB | Following station |
|---|---|---|
| Neukirchen-Gampern towards Freilassing | R 2 | Vöcklabruck towards Linz Hbf |
Location
- Location within Austria

Timelkam (German: Bahnhof Timelkam) is a railway station in the town of Timelkam, Upper Austria, Austria. The train services are operated by ÖBB.

Founded in 1974, the Austrian Railway History Society shows the largest private collection of steam locomotives and coaches in Austria. The society runs two museum lines in Upper Austria: Ampflwang – Timelkam and Steyr – Gruenburg

== Train services ==
The station is served by the following services:

| Train Type | Operator | Route |
|---|---|---|
| Regional | ÖBB | Salzburg Taxham Europark – Salzburg Hbf – Steindorf bei Straßwalchen – Timelkam – Vöcklabruck – Attnang-Puchheim – Wels Hbf – Linz Hbf |
| Regional | ÖBB | Freilassing – Salzburg Hbf – Steindorf bei Straßwalchen – Timelkam – Vöcklabruck – Attnang-Puchheim – Wels Hbf – Linz Hbf |
