= Redl-Zipf railway station =

Railway station in Upper Austria

Redl-Zipf
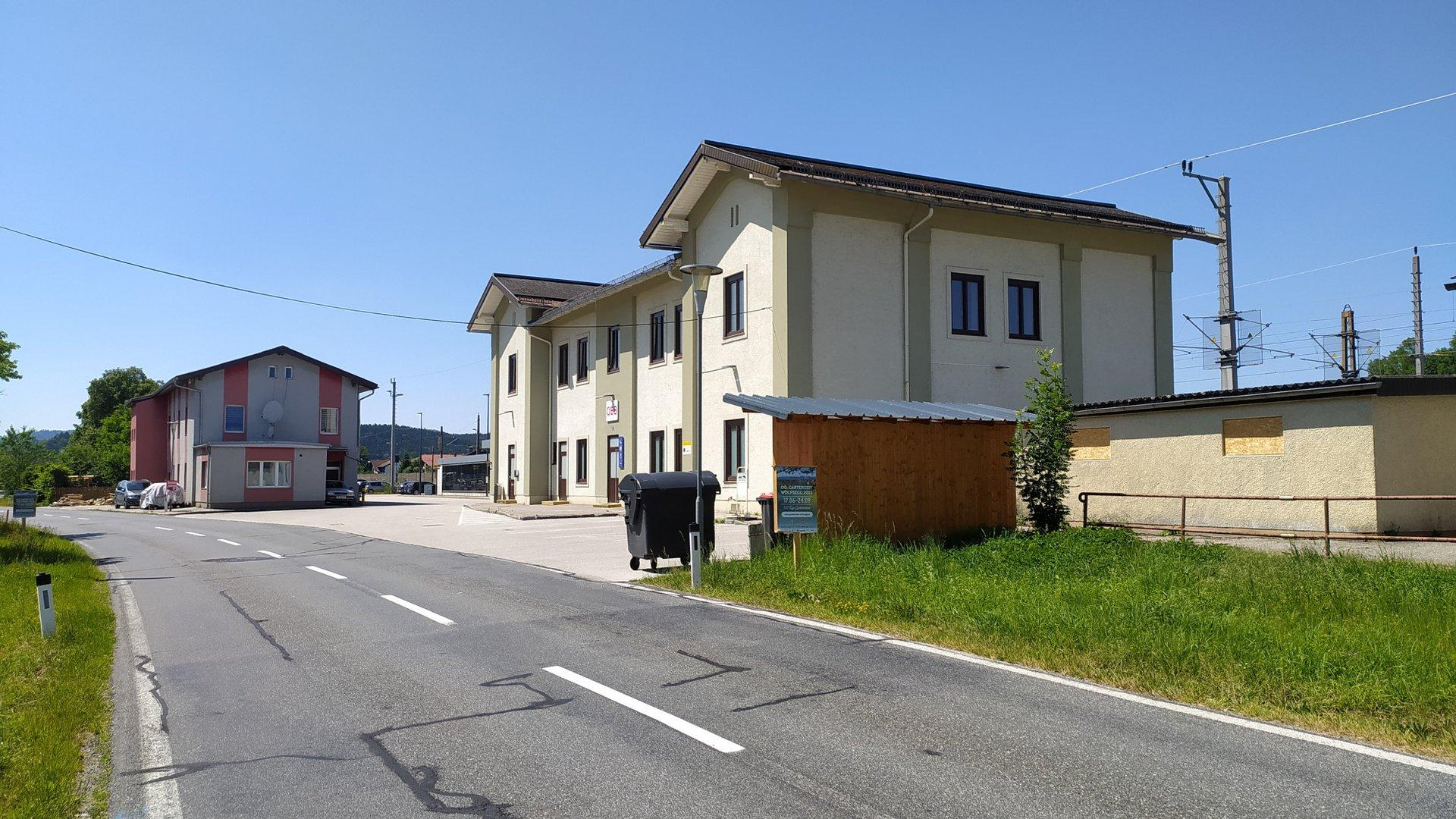
- Redl-Zipf railway station

General information
- Location: Langwies 16; 4871 Zipf; Austria
- Coordinates: 48°01′34″N 13°30′53″E
- Owner: ÖBB
- Operator: ÖBB
- Line: Western Railway
- Distance: 259.7 kilometres (161.4 mi) from Wien Westbahnhof
- Platforms: 3

Services
Preceding station	ÖBB	Following station
Vöcklamarkt towards Freilassing	R 2	Neukirchen-Gampern towards Linz Hbf
Location
- Location within Austria

Redl-Zipf railway station (German: Bahnhof Redl-Zipf) is a railway station near the village of Zipf, Upper Austria, Austria. It is located on the Western Railway. The train services are operated by ÖBB.

== Services ==
As of the December 2024 timetable change, the following services stop at Redl-Zipf:

- ÖBB: regional service between Freilassing and Linz Hbf.
