= Vöcklabruck railway station =

Railway station in Upper Austria

Vöcklabruck
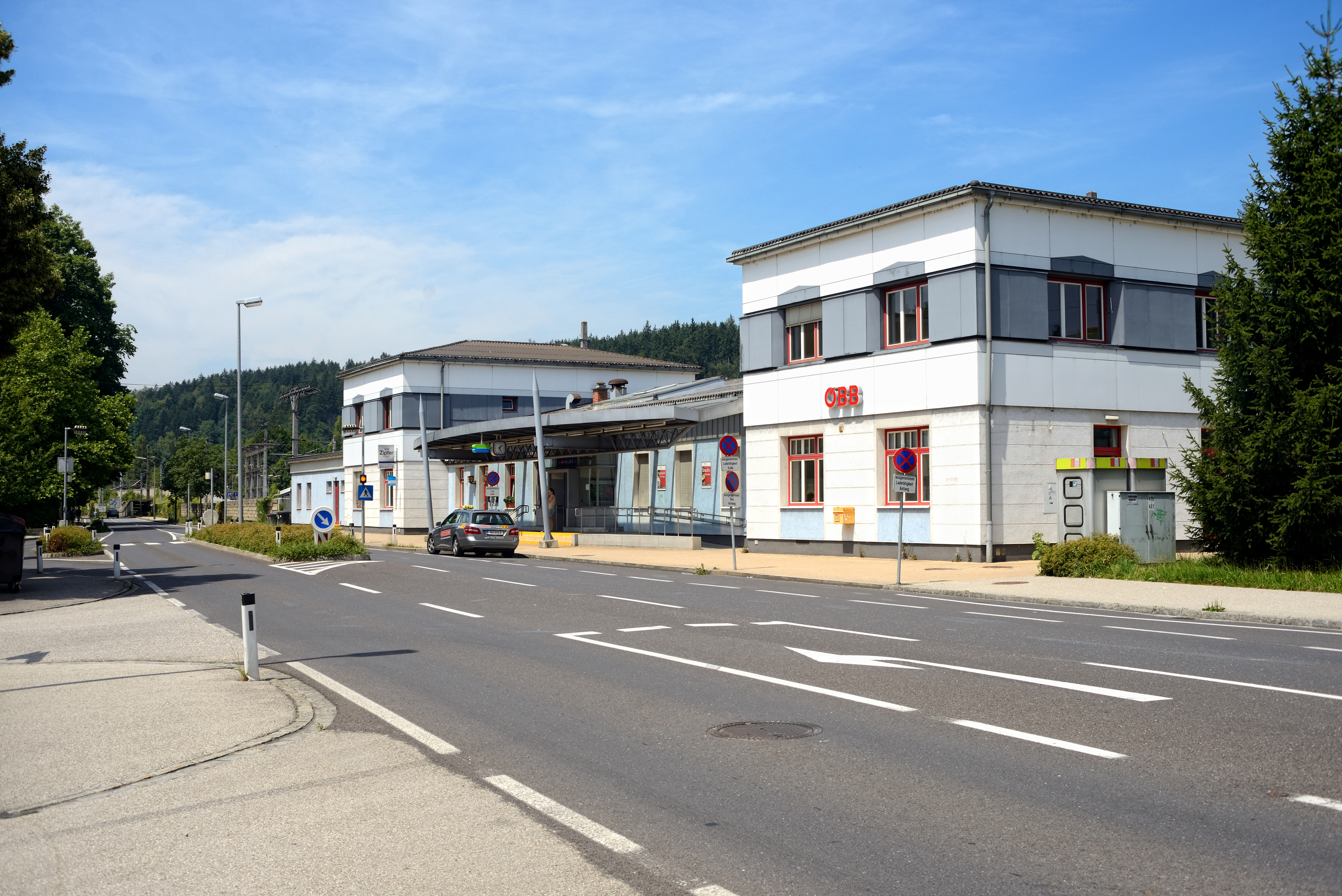
- Vöcklabruck railway station

General information
- Location: Bahnhofstrasse 17; 4840 Vöcklabruck; Austria
- Coordinates: 48°00′35″N 13°39′52″E
- Owner: ÖBB
- Operator: ÖBB; WESTbahn
- Line: Western Railway

Services
Preceding station	ÖBB	Following station
Neumarkt am Wallersee towards Salzburg Hbf	Railjet	Attnang-Puchheim towards Wien Hbf
Neumarkt am Wallersee towards Stuttgart Hbf	InterCity	Attnang-Puchheim towards Wien Hbf
Salzburg Hbf towards Bregenz	Nightjet	Attnang-Puchheim towards Wien Hbf
Timelkam towards Freilassing	R 2	Attnang-Puchheim towards Linz Hbf
Oberthalheim-Timelkam towards Kammer-Schörfling	Regionalzug	Attnang-Puchheim Terminus
Salzburg Hbf towards Bregenz	Nightjet	Attnang-Puchheim towards Wien Hbf
Preceding station		Following station
Salzburg Hbf toward München Hbf	WESTgreen	Attnang-Puchheim toward Wien Westbahnhof
Salzburg Hbf toward Innsbruck Hbf	WESTblue	Attnang-Puchheim toward Wien Westbahnhof
Location
- Location within Austria

Vöcklabruck (German: Bahnhof Vöcklabruck) is a railway station in the town of Vöcklabruck, Upper Austria, Austria. The station is located on the Western Railway. The train services are operated by ÖBB and WESTbahn.

== Train services ==
The station is served by the following services:

Train Type	Operator	Route
EuroCity	ÖBB	Frankfurt Hbf - Stuttgart Hbf - München Hbf - Freilassing - Salzburg Hbf - Vöcklabruck - Wels Hbf - Linz Hbf
InterCity	ÖBB	Salzburg Hbf - Vöcklabruck - Wels Hbf - Linz Hbf - St. Valentin - Amstetten - St. Pölten Hbf - Wien Westbf
InterCity	ÖBB	Saalfelden - Zell am See - Bischofshofen - Salzburg Hbf - Vöcklabruck - Wels Hbf - Linz Hbf - St. Valentin - Amstetten - St. Pölten Hbf - Wien Westbf
InterCity	ÖBB	Klagenfurt Hbf - Villach Hbf - Bischofshofen - Salzburg Hbf - Vöcklabruck - Wels Hbf - Linz Hbf - St. Valentin - Amstetten - St. Pölten Hbf - Wien Westbf
InterCity	ÖBB	Innsbruck Hbf - Salzburg Hbf - Vöcklabruck - Wels Hbf - Linz Hbf - St. Valentin - Amstetten - St. Pölten Hbf - Wien Westbf
InterCity	ÖBB	Innsbruck Hbf - Jenbach - Wörgl Hbf - Kufstein - Saalfelden - Zell am See - Bischofshofen - Salzburg Hbf - Vöcklabruck - Wels Hbf - Linz Hbf - St. Valentin - Amstetten - St. Pölten Hbf - Wien Westbf
InterCity	ÖBB	Bregenz - St. Anton am Arlberg - Landeck-Zams - Innsbruck Hbf - Salzburg Hbf - Vöcklabruck - Wels Hbf - Linz Hbf - St. Valentin - Amstetten - St. Pölten Hbf - Wien Westbf
Night Sleeper	EuroNight	Venice - Villach Westbf - Salzburg Hbf - Vöcklabruck - Wien Westbf
Regional	ÖBB	Salzburg Taxham Europark - Salzburg Hbf - Steindorf bei Straßwalchen - Vöcklabruck - Attnang-Puchheim - Wels Hbf - Linz Hbf
Regional	ÖBB	Kammer-Schörfling - Lenzing - Vöcklabruck - Attnang-Puchheim
Regional	ÖBB	Freilassing - Salzburg Hbf - Steindorf bei Straßwalchen - Vöcklabruck - Attnang-Puchheim - Wels Hbf - Linz Hbf
