= Wienerwald Tunnel =

Austrian railway tunnel

Coordinates: 48°10′45″N 16°12′26″E

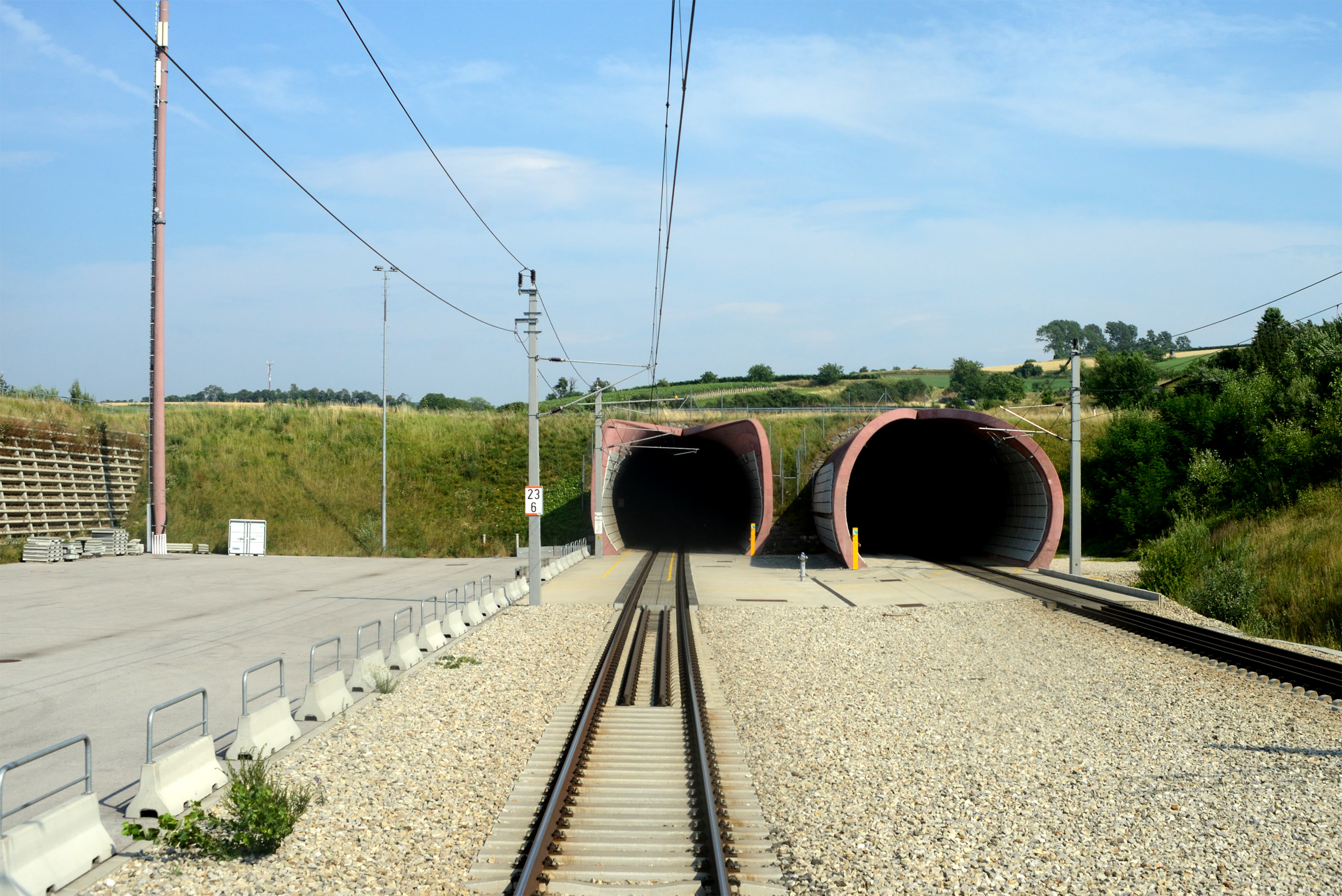
- Entrance to the Wienerwald Tunnel from the Tullnerfeld side

- Location within Austria

Overview
- Status: Active

Operation
- Opened: 9 December 2012

Technical
- Line length: 13,356 m (8.299 mi)
- Track gauge: 1,435 mm (4 ft 8 1/2 in) standard gauge

The Wienerwald Tunnel (German: Wienerwaldtunnel) is a 13.35 km (8.30 mi) long railway tunnel near Vienna, passing underneath the northern part of Wienerwald. It is part of a 250-kilometre-per-hour (160 mph) section between Vienna and St. Pölten which is part of Austria's Western Railway.

The Wienerwald Tunnel was constructed as part of a major expansion of Austria's most important rail corridor, it was intentionally built as a measure to minimise gradients and facilitate high speed traffic, as well as for better accessibility to the newly constructed Wien Hauptbahnhof central station in Vienna. It is divided into two distinct sections, comprising a single bore accommodating a pair of tracks and two parallel bores each carrying a single track; it also meets up with several other neighbouring tunnels, including the Lainzer Tunnel. Construction of the Wienerwald Tunnel commenced in autumn 2004, largely relying on conventional methods. Breakthrough was achieved in early 2010, after which fitting out commenced. The tunnel has been in operational use since 9 December 2012.

== Background and configuration ==
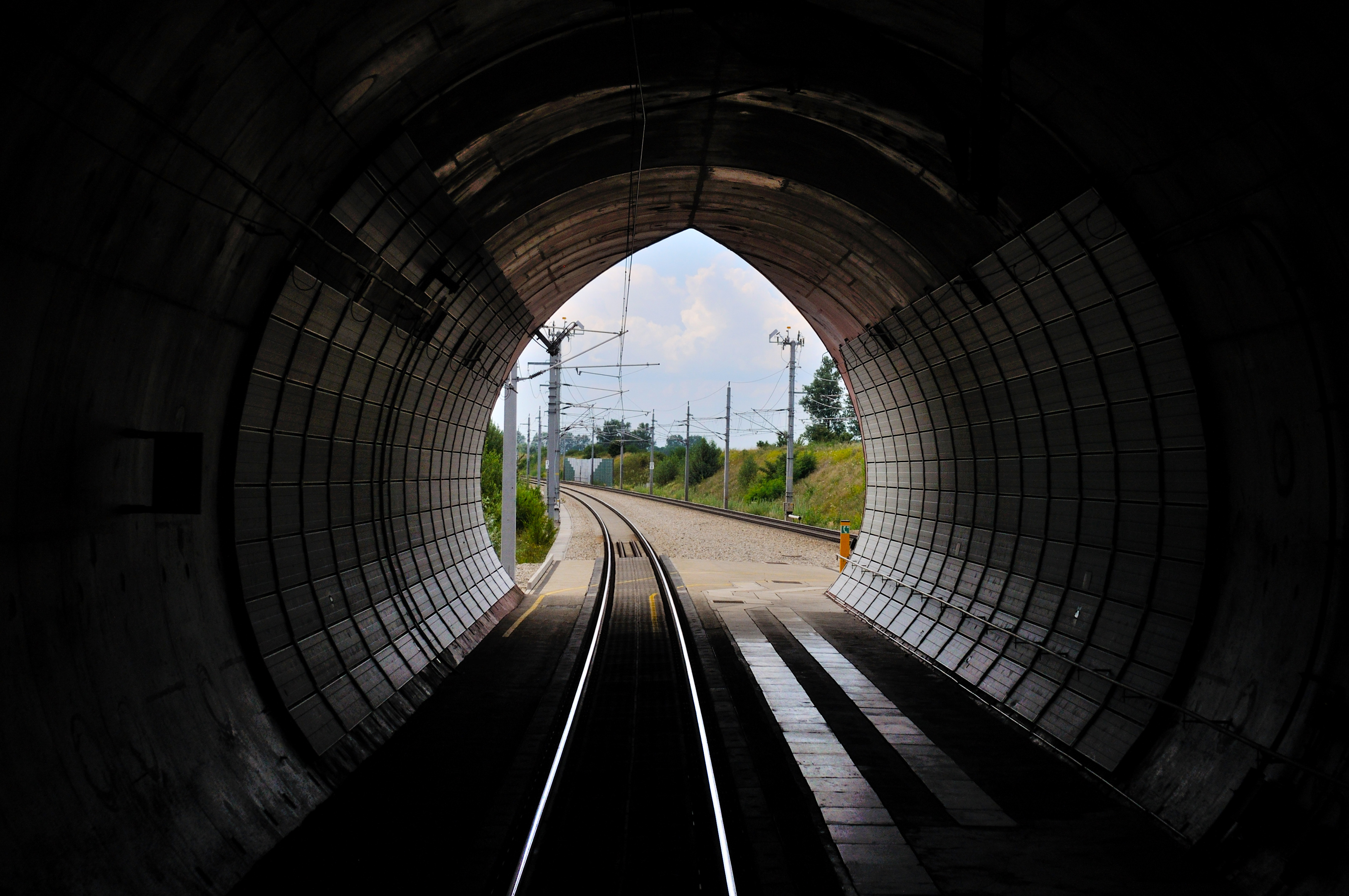
View from just inside the tunnel, facing towards Tullnerfeld

During the early twenty-first century, the Austrian government authorised the four-tracking of the Westbahn, which was the nation's most important rail corridor. Accordingly, the section between Vienna and St. Pölten saw the construction of two new tracks on an alignment free from challenging gradients and suitable for high speed operations, which deviated far to the North of the original line. It was along this new route that the Wienerwald Tunnel, which is the single biggest engineering structure, was constructed to convey the line across the Wienerwald mountain range. Its construction facilitate the movement of trains traversing the Westbahn to call at Wien Hauptbahnhof, the recently completed central station serving Vienna.

In relation to the rest of the line, the Wienerwald Tunnel formed only one element of a wider complex of tunnels. Towards the eastern end (nearest Vienna), it meets with an underground junction with another 2.2 km tunnel, carrying two extra tracks for the old Westbahn, which has been operational since December 2008, and direct tracks across the junction continue in the Lainzer Tunnel, a 12.3 km long twin-track single tube tunnel that was constructed in parallel with the Wienerwald Tunnel. When combined with the adjacent Lainzer Tunnel, the Wienerwald Tunnel results in trains covering an underground distance of 26 km, making it Austria's longest tunnel at the time.

== Construction ==
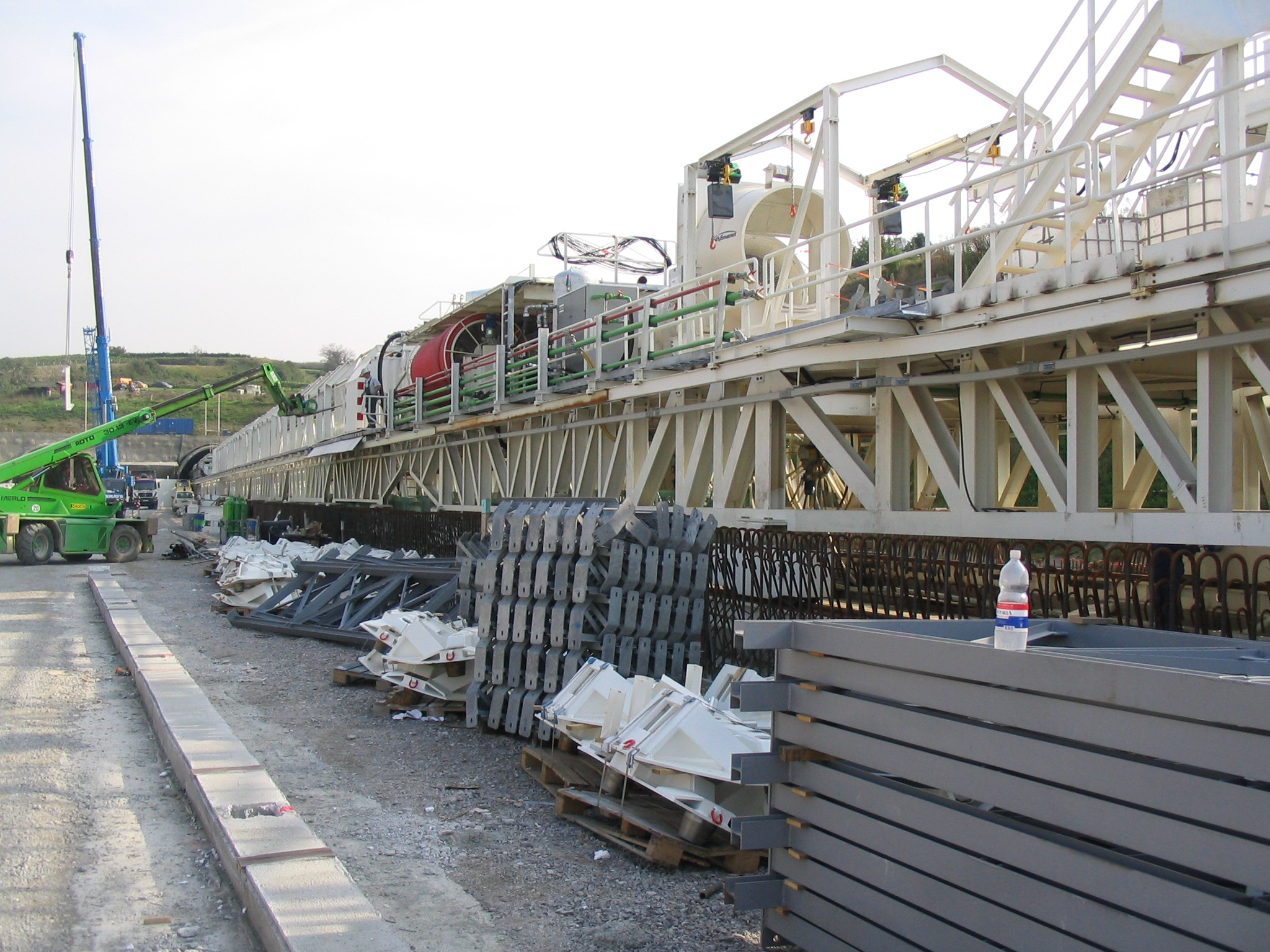
A tunnel boring machine (TBM) outside the under-construction Wienerwald Tunnel

During autumn 2004, work commenced on the boring of the tunnel's single tube section. From its western portal, the first 11 km of the Wienerwald Tunnel was constructed as a bi-tube tunnel (a tunnel consisting of two connected single-track tubes), which the remainder was constructed as a single tube accommodating the two tracks. The early excavation work predominantly used conventional drilling and blasting techniques. Roughly one year later, the boring of the bi-tube section commenced using a pair of tunnel boring machines (TBMs); this was the first tunnel in Austria to use TBMs outside conurbations. The route of the tunnel passed through layers of siltstone, mudstone, and sandstone, as well as more challenging geology such as marlstone; water ingress of up to 0.5 liters per second proved to be a particular challenge for the project.

The excavation phase progressed steadily, reaching a peak rate of 254 meters in a single week. To minimise unfavourable movement associated with settlement, sidewall heading were driven at the start of the bi-tube section. The spoil generated by the excavation, estimated to be roughly 2 million m³ of material in all, was predominantly used as fill for an embankment running along a 10km section of the line. Residual waste, earthworks, roadworks, and sewers were also redeveloped or treated appropriately. For structural strength, the walls were lined with reinforced concrete segments, which are considered to be impermeable to water, throughout the tunnel's length. Secondary elements of the tunnel include 25 cross-passages, an emergency exit shaft, and a 490 m long muck heading.

On 16 August 2007, breakthrough in the tunnel was announced, a major milestone in the construction; use of the TBMs was discontinued in the same year as a result. During February 2010, all structural work was declared to be complete, work progressed to the fitting out phase, during which elements such as the traditional slab-based track and various safety measures were installed, from the summer of 2010. On 9 December 2012, the tunnel and line were both inaugurated. The completed route has not only increased freight capacities but enabled a reduction in travel time.
