= Vöcklamarkt =

Vöcklamarkt Vöcklamoakt
- Municipality
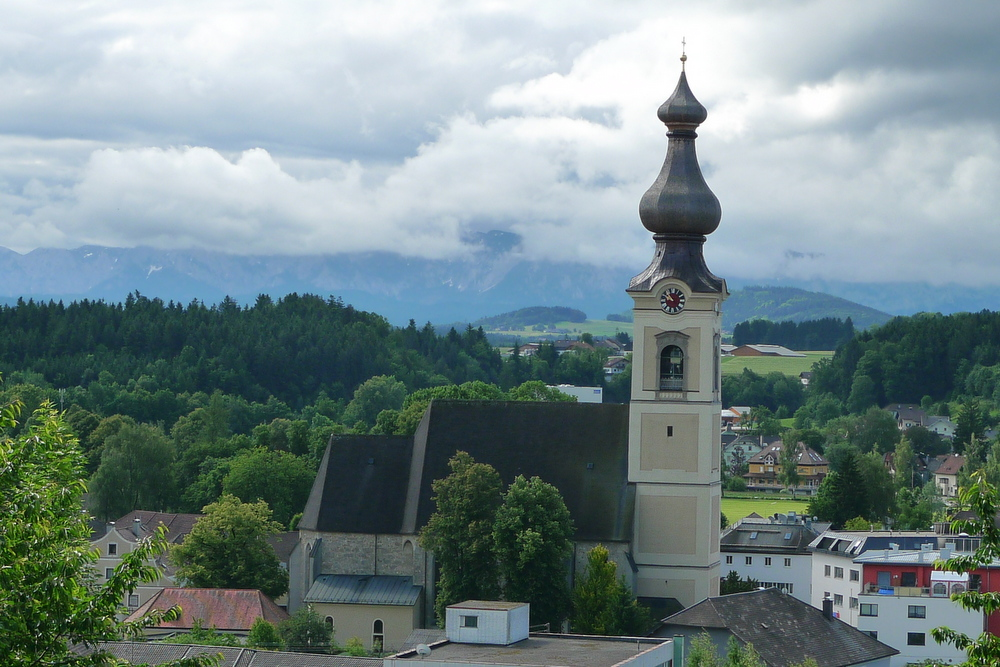

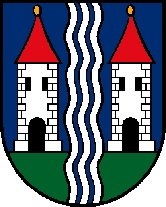
- Coat of arms

- Location within Austria
- Coordinates: 48°00′11″N 13°29′07″E
- Country: Austria
- State: Upper Austria
- District: Vöcklabruck

Government
  - Mayor: Josef Six (ÖVP)

Area
  - Total: 27.43 km^{2} (10.59 sq mi)
- Elevation: 488 m (1,601 ft)

Population (2018-01-01)
  - Total: 4,924
  - Density: 179.5/km^{2} (464.9/sq mi)
- Time zone: UTC+1 (CET)
  - Summer (DST): UTC+2 (CEST)
- Postal code: 4870
- Area code: 07682
- Vehicle registration: VB
- Website: www.voecklamarkt.ooe.gv.at

Vöcklamarkt (Central Bavarian: Vöcklamoakt) is a municipality in the district of Vöcklabruck in the Austrian state of Upper Austria.

== Population ==
Historical population
Year	Pop.	±%
1991	4,513	—
2001	4,765	+5.6%
2010	5,063	+6.3%

== Transport ==
The town is served by Vöcklamarkt railway station.
