= Lainz Tunnel =

Coordinates: 48°10′12″N 16°19′12″E

The Lainz Tunnel (German: Lainzer Tunnel) is a 12.8-kilometre-long, double-track railway tunnel in Vienna. It forms one part of a wider tunnel network that includes the neighbouring Wienerwald Tunnel, it connects Austria's Western, Southern, Eastern and Donauländebahn railways and greatly simplifies international and national connectivity in Vienna. The Lainz Tunnel has been in service since 9 December 2012.

The Lainz Tunnel was constructed during the 2000s and early 2010s as part of a major expansion of Austria's most important rail corridor, it was intentionally built as a measure to minimise gradients and facilitate high speed traffic, as well as for better accessibility to the newly constructed Wien Hauptbahnhof central station in Vienna. It is divided into two distinct sections, comprising a single bore accommodating a pair of tracks and two parallel bores each carrying a single track; it also meets up with several other neighbouring tunnels, including the Wienerwald Tunnel.

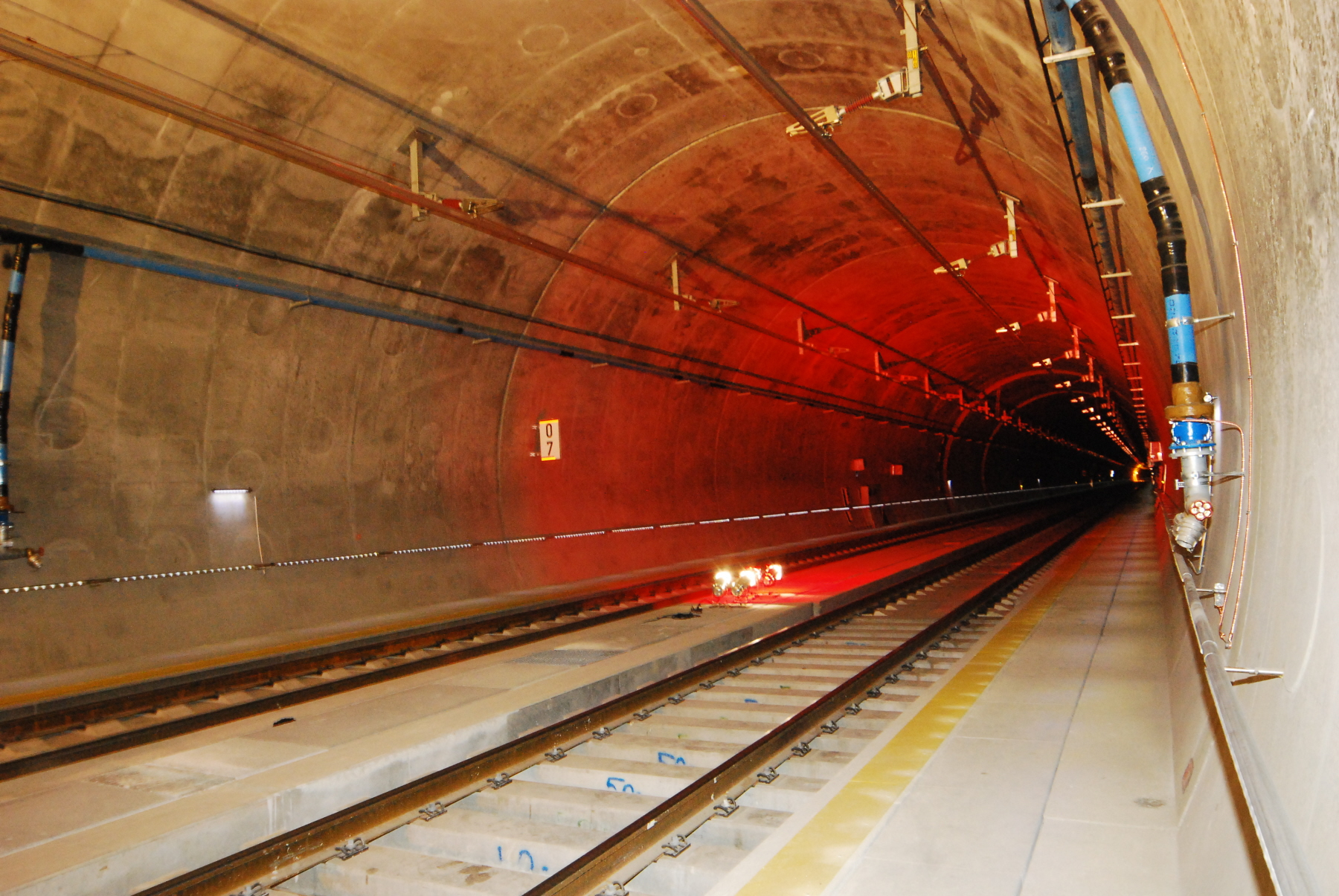
section Altmannsdorfer Strasse

== Background and configuration ==
During the early twenty-first century, the Austrian government authorised the four-tracking of the Westbahn, which was the nation's most important rail corridor. Accordingly, the section between Vienna and St. Pölten saw the construction of two new tracks on an alignment free from challenging gradients and suitable for high speed operations, which deviated far to the North of the original line. It was along this new route that the Wienerwald Tunnel, which is the single biggest engineering structure, was constructed to convey the line across the Wienerwald mountain range. Its construction facilitated the movement of trains traversing the Westbahn to call at Wien Hütteldorf railway station.

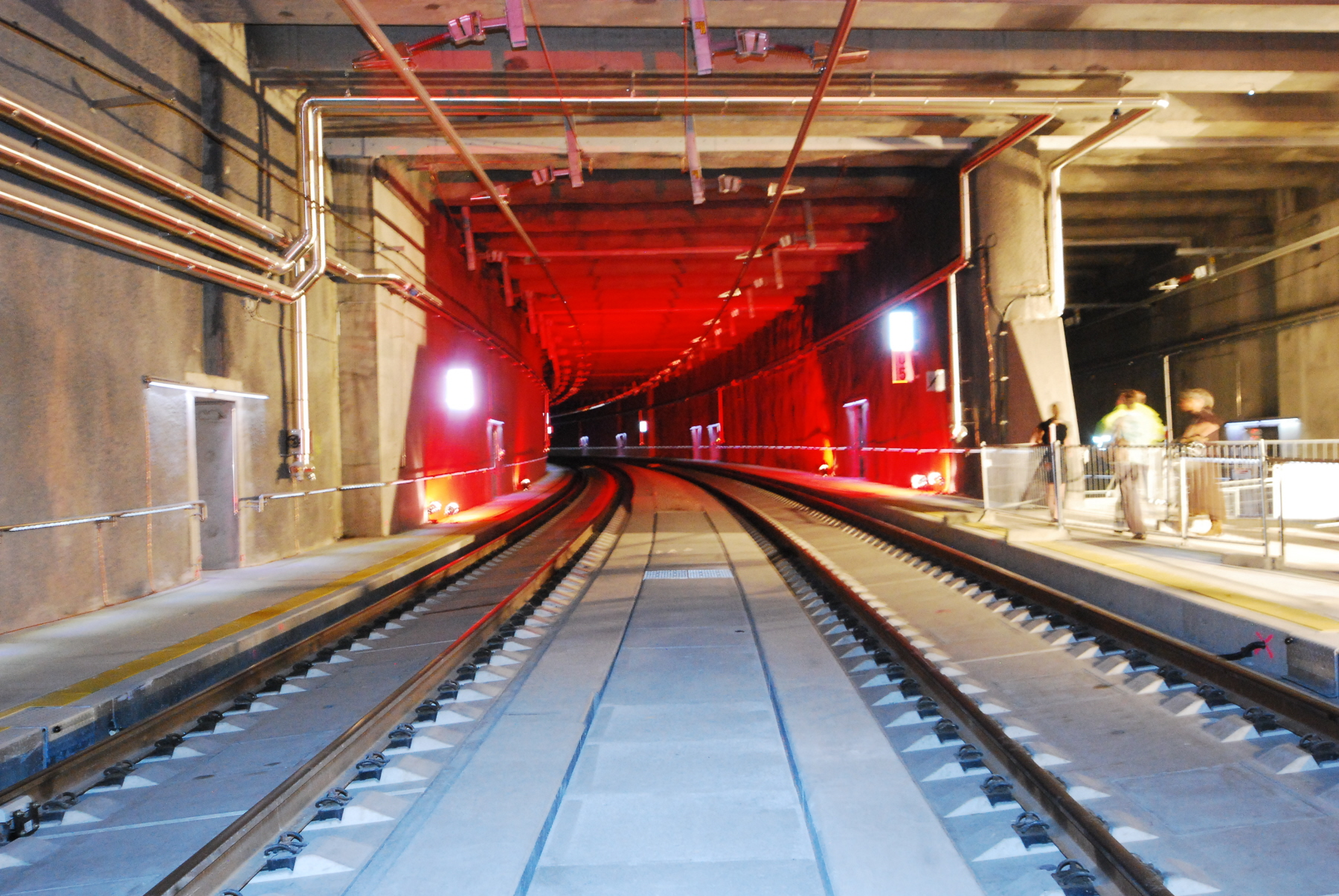
Lainz Tunnel during construction

In relation to the rest of the line, the Lainz Tunnel formed only one element of a wider complex of tunnels. Towards the western end, roughly 2 km west of Wien Hütteldorf and the furthest end from Vienna, it meets with an underground junction with another 2.2 km tunnel, carrying two extra tracks for the old Westbahn, which has been operational since December 2008, and direct tracks across the junction continue in the Wienerwald Tunnel, a 13.35 km long twin-track single tube tunnel that was constructed in parallel with the Lainz Tunnel. When combined with the adjacent Lainzer Tunnel, the Wienerwald Tunnel results in trains covering an underground distance of 26 km, making it Austria's longest tunnel.

From the western end, the Lainz Tunnel turns southeast and passes under a stormwater retention basin and the forested area of Lainzer Tiergarten in Vienna's 13th district Hietzing. Throughout its length, it various in, including single or double track tubes, pillar galleries, and wider sections for changeovers are included. To address safety concerns, various adits, galleries, and shafts have been provisioned. As it nears the western terminus, the tunnel divides into two sections, with one double-track connection emerging just before Wien Meidling railway station on the Southern Railways and the other further south connecting to the Donauländebahn railway and the intermodal terminal at Inzersdorf opened in 2016. Passenger trains are able to traverse it at speeds of up to 160 km/h, while freight trains are limited to 120 km/h instead. It is 12.3 km long (15.4 including connecting ramps) and equipped with ETCS level 2 as well as the legacy PZB control system

== Construction and operations ==
During the late 1990s, geological surveys were conducted in preparation for the tunnel's construction; these determined that the intended route was feasible in multiple respects, including the local geology, geohydraulogy, and environmental impact. The geology it passes through is primarily composed of layered silt and clay, accompanied by thin layers of sand and gravel. Ahead of the primary excavation activity, numerous vertical wells were driven for the purpose of lowering the local water table. Construction activity on the Lainz Tunnel commenced during 2000.

The excavation phase of the Lainz Tunnel's construction involved considerably different methods of construction; while the majority of its length was excavated the New Austrian Tunnelling Method of underground boring, limited portions that featured unfavourable prevailing conditions used the cut-and-cover approach instead. The double track tunnel tube sections of the tunnel were excavated via sidewall galleries followed by core drive activity; backhoes were used extensively. Support was primarily delivered through a combination of shotcrete, wire mesh, and lattice girders; additional rebar reinforcement was applied to areas which were deemed to necessitate additional reinforcement. While the installation of a pipe roof had been considered, this was found to be unnecessary. Spoil was removed by rail for disposal via landfills.

Throughout the construction, sensors were active to monitor conditions such as ground settlement; these were observed to be below set limits throughout the project. On 9 December 2012, both the Lainz Tunnel and the wider line were inaugurated. The completed route has facilitated not only a considerable increase in freight capacity but a noticeable reduction in travel times as well.

Since its completion, the Lainz Tunnel has formed a key civil engineering element for the east–west transit of railway traffic as part of the Magistrale for Europe. Previously, international passenger trains either terminated at Wien Westbahnhof station and passengers travelling eastbound had to make their way to Wien Südbahnhof station, or had to be reversed in Westbahnhof and travelled along a single-track connection through residential areas. In 2014, the new Wien Hauptbahnhof through station replaced this former terminus, and in 2015 most long-distance services were concentrated at Hauptbahnhof, with trains originating from or bound for the Western railway travelling through the high-speed Wienerwald Tunnel and continuing on through the Lainz Tunnel towards Hauptbahnhof and to destinations beyond. The tunnel is also heavily used by freight trains bound for Vienna's central classification yard by way of a branch turning near the eastern end.
