= Franz Rauscher =

Austrian Social Democrat politician

Franz Rauscher, born in Vienna, Austria, (30 July 1900 – 11 March 1988) was an Austrian Social Democrat politician.

== Life ==
=== Provenance and early years ===
Rauscher's father was a railway worker. He himself embarked on an apprenticeship as a mechanic and found work in a munitions factory. Despite his youth he was elected a trades union official. He took part in the wave demonstrations and strikes that broke out in Vienna directly after the First World War. Then, in 1919, he switched to the railways, now employed as an office worker at the Westbahnhof (main railway station). He again became active as a trades unionist. Workers' education would be a recurring theme in Rauscher's career, and at the Westbahnhof he set up the Railwaymen's Library. In 1926 he teamed up with Rosa Jochmann to found the Workers' Academy ("Arbeiterhochschule") in Vienna 19 (Döbling). It is not clear when or whether the two of them actually married, but they now became life-partners.

Rauscher was involved in setting up the Vienna Party School, of which he was the principal between 1927 and his arrest in 1934.

=== Years of political polarisation ===
In the late 1920s he was among the co-organizers, in Lower Austria, of the Republikanischer Schutzbund, an SDAPÖ paramilitary movement set up to counter the growth in political extremism that was spilling onto the streets. The Self-elimination of the Austrian Parliament took place on 4 March 1933 and was interpreted by Chancellor Dollfuss as an unexpected but not unwelcome invitation to suspend parliamentary democracy. Social Democratic members were escorted from the parliament in Vienna by the police. Over the next few months the Social Democratic Party was progressively repressed and outlawed, formally on 12 February 1934. Trades unions were also banned: Franz Rauscher remained politically engaged and went "underground" (which involved living without being registered at the city hall). Then, as part of the backwash from the brief but intense Austrian Civil War, Rauscher was arrested in October 1934. He then appeared as one of 28 defendants in the so-called "trial of the socialists" ("Sozialistenprozess") which opened at the Vienna district court on 16 March 1936. One of his co-defendants was Bruno Kreisky who would go one to become, many years later, Austria's longest-serving federal chancellor since the creation of the republic in 1919. The trial received widespread coverage in the foreign press. In the context of Austrifascism the convictions were a foregone conclusion, but the sentences, handed down on 24 March 1936, were significantly milder than many had anticipated. Franz Rauscher received a ten month jail sentence for "sedition and high treason" ("Aufruhr und Hochverrat") which he served in the Anhaltelager Wöllersdorf (loosely, "Wöllersdorf holding camp"). He also lost his job with the railways. It is not clear from sources whether Rauscher spent time in pre-trial detention between his arrest in October 1934 and the trial in March 1936. Any time already served would normally have been off-set against the sentence he received at the trial. In any event, those sentenced to jail terms at the "trial of the socialists" in March 1936 were the beneficiaries of the political prisoners' amnesty in July 1936, meaning that Rauscher was released in or before July 1936.

=== Anschluss years ===
In March 1938 German troops entered Austria, which was followed by rapid integration, giving rise to a "Greater Germany" that incorporated the two hitherto separate states. A few days after the armies arrived from the west Franz Rauscher was arrested by the Gestapo, but he was released a week later. He found a job with the Schoeller-Bleckmann Stahlwerke (steel company). In 1939 he was re-arrested by the Gestapo, however. This time he was transferred to the Buchenwald concentration camp: he was held in state detention for the next six years. At some stage during the Second World War, which in this part of Europe lasted from 1939 till 1945, he was transferred to the Majdanek concentration camp in occupied Poland. Shortly before the war ended he was either liberated by the Red army or else managed to escape from the concentration camp as the state infrastructure of Nazi Germany collapsed. He made his way back to Austria, arriving at Salzburg on 14 April 1945. The Soviet and western governments had already declared the 1938 combining of Germany with Austria null and void, and within two weeks of Rauscher's arrival at the border by Salzburg a hastily assembled Austrian provisional government in Vienna, under Chancellor Renner, had anticipated the requirements of the country's new masters with a Declaration of Austrian Independence signed by the leaders of the three main political parties (which included the Social Democrats) on 27 April 1945.

=== Postwar ===
From 1945 Rauscher was involved in the re-establishment of the Social Democratic Party of Austria. He also contributed at a national level to rebuilding the country. On 26 September 1945 he accepted an appointment as Undersecretary of State for security, administration, planning and the application of state assets. (Note: Unterstaatssekretär für Sicherung, Verwaltung, Planung und Verwendung öffentlichen Vermögens) He resigned from this post after slightly less than three months, in connection with his election the previous month to the National Council (parliament), in which he sat as an SPÖ member till standing down in November 1949, ahead of the next general election. Between March 1946 and January 1947 Rauscher served briefly as secretary of state at what would today be identified as the Ministry of Economics.
