= Vienna Party School =

The Vienna Party School was an organisation established by the Social Democratic Party of Austria.

== History ==
The Vienna Party School was founded in 1924. From 1927 to 1934 it was headed by Franz Rauscher, before it was suppressed by the Austrofascists and Rauscher jailed.

The school was divided into a lower school and middle school. The lower school ran training courses for shop stewards. During the first period the middle school taught from 60 to 100 graduates per year.
