= Attnang-Puchheim railway station =

Railway station in Upper Austria

Attnang-Puchheim
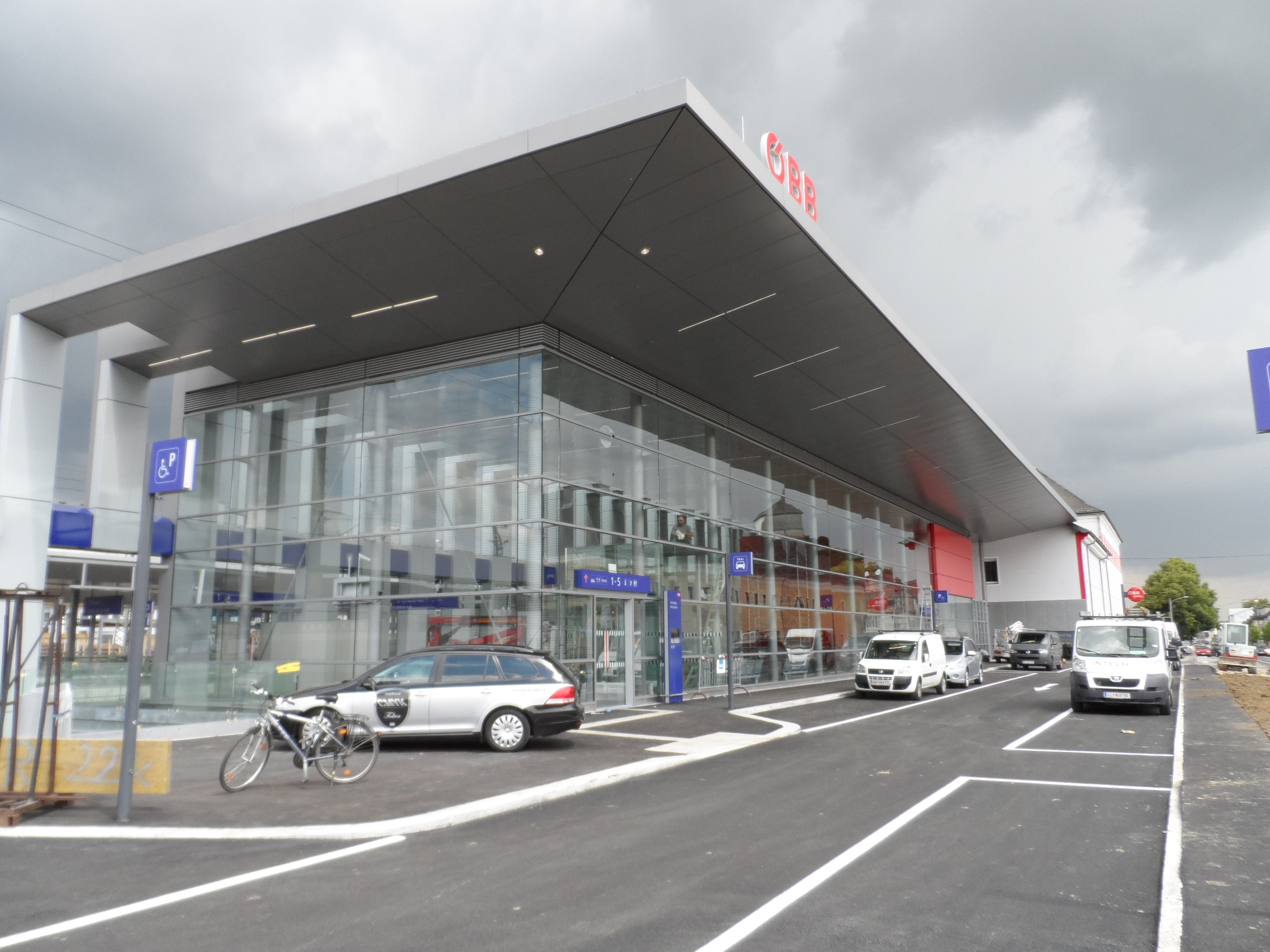
- Attnang-Puchheim railway station in 2014

General information
- Location: Rennerplatz 6; 4800 Attnang-Puchheim; Austria
- Coordinates: 48°00′41″N 13°43′09″E
- Owner: ÖBB
- Operator: ÖBB; WESTbahn
- Lines: Western Railway; Salzkammergutbahn
- Platforms: 8

History
- Opened: 1860

Services
Preceding station	ÖBB	Following station
Vöcklabruck towards Salzburg Hbf	Railjet	Wels Hbf towards Wien Hbf
Gmunden towards Stainach-Irdning	InterCity	Linz Hbf towards Wien Hbf
Vöcklabruck towards Stuttgart Hbf	InterCity	Wels Hbf towards Wien Hbf
Salzburg Hbf towards Zürich HB or Venezia Santa Lucia	Nightjet	Wels Hbf towards Wien Hbf
Vöcklabruck towards Bregenz	Nightjet	Wels Hbf towards Wien Hbf
Vöcklabruck towards Freilassing	R 2	Schwanenstadt towards Linz Hbf
Vöcklabruck towards Kammer-Schörfling	Regionalzug	Terminus
Wankham bei Attnang towards Obertraun Dachsteinhöhlen	Regionalzug	Terminus
Preceding station		Following station
Vöcklabruck toward München Hbf	WESTgreen	Wels Hbf toward Wien Westbahnhof
Vöcklabruck toward Innsbruck Hbf	WESTblue	Wels Hbf toward Wien Westbahnhof
Preceding station	PKP Intercity	Following station
Salzburg Hbf towards München Hbf	EuroNight	Linz Hbf towards Warszawa Wschodnia
Location
- Location within Austria

Attnang-Puchheim (German: Bahnhof Attnang-Puchheim) is a railway station in the town of Attnang-Puchheim, Upper Austria, Austria. The train services are operated by ÖBB and WESTbahn. The station is served by regional services as well as Intercity and EuroNight services.

== Train services ==
The station is served by the following services:

Train Type	Operator	Route
EuroCity	ÖBB	Frankfurt Hbf - Stuttgart Hbf - München Hbf - Freilassing - Salzburg Hbf - Vöcklabruck - Attnang-Puchheim - Wels Hbf - Linz Hbf
Intercity	Westbahn	Freilassing - Salzburg Hbf - Attnang-Puchheim - Wels Hbf - Linz Hbf - Amstetten - St. Pölten Hbf - Wien Westbf
InterCity	ÖBB	Stainach-Irdning - Bad Mittendorf - Bad Ischl - Ebensee - Gmunden - Attnang-Puchheim - Wels Hbf - Linz Hbf - St. Valentin - Amstetten - St. Pölten Hbf - Wien Westbf
InterCity	ÖBB	Salzburg Hbf - Attnang-Puchheim - Wels Hbf - Linz Hbf - St. Valentin - Amstetten - St. Pölten Hbf - Wien Westbf
InterCity	ÖBB	Saalfelden - Zell am See - Bischofshofen - Salzburg Hbf - Attnang-Puchheim - Wels Hbf - Linz Hbf - St. Valentin - Amstetten - St. Pölten Hbf - Wien Westbf
InterCity	ÖBB	Klagenfurt Hbf - Villach Hbf - Bischofshofen - Salzburg Hbf - Attnang-Puchheim - Wels Hbf - Linz Hbf - St. Valentin - Amstetten - St. Pölten Hbf - Wien Westbf
InterCity	ÖBB	Innsbruck Hbf - Salzburg Hbf - Attnang-Puchheim - Wels Hbf - Linz Hbf - St. Valentin - Amstetten - St. Pölten Hbf - Wien Westbf
InterCity	ÖBB	Innsbruck Hbf - Jenbach - Wörgl Hbf - Kufstein - Saalfelden - Zell am See - Bischofshofen - Salzburg Hbf - Attnang-Puchheim - Wels Hbf - Linz Hbf - St. Valentin - Amstetten - St. Pölten Hbf - Wien Westbf
InterCity	ÖBB	Bregenz - St. Anton am Arlberg - Landeck-Zams - Innsbruck Hbf - Salzburg Hbf - Attnang-Puchheim - Wels Hbf - Linz Hbf - St. Valentin - Amstetten - St. Pölten Hbf - Wien Westbf
Night Sleeper	EuroNight	München Hbf - Salzburg Hbf - Attnang-Puchheim - Wien Westbf - Budapest Keleti
Night Sleeper	EuroNight	Zürich HB - Innsbruck Hbf - Salzburg Hbf - Attnang-Puchheim - Wien Westbf - Budapest Keleti
Night Sleeper	EuroNight	Venice - Villach Westbf - Salzburg Hbf - Attnang-Puchheim - Wien Westbf
Night Sleeper	EuroNight	Bregenz - St. Anton am Arlberg - Landeck-Zams - Innsbruck Hbf - Salzburg Hbf - Attnang-Puchheim - Wien Westbf
Regional	ÖBB	Salzburg Taxham Europark - Salzburg Hbf - Steindorf bei Straßwalchen - Vöcklabruck - Attnang-Puchheim - Wels Hbf - Linz Hbf
Regional	ÖBB	Kammer-Schörfling - Lenzing - Vöcklabruck - Attnang-Puchheim
Regional	ÖBB	Obertraun Dachsteinhöhlen - Hallstadt - Bad Goisern - Bad Ischl - Ebensee - Gmunden - Attnang-Puchheim (- Wels Hbf - Linz Hbf)
Regional	ÖBB	(Schärding - Suben -) Ried im Innkreis Bad - Ried im Innkreis - Eberschwang - Ottnang-Wolfsegg - Attnang-Puchheim
Regional	ÖBB	Freilassing - Salzburg Hbf - Steindorf bei Straßwalchen - Vöcklabruck - Attnang-Puchheim - Wels Hbf - Linz Hbf
