= Linz Hauptbahnhof =

Railway station in Upper Austria

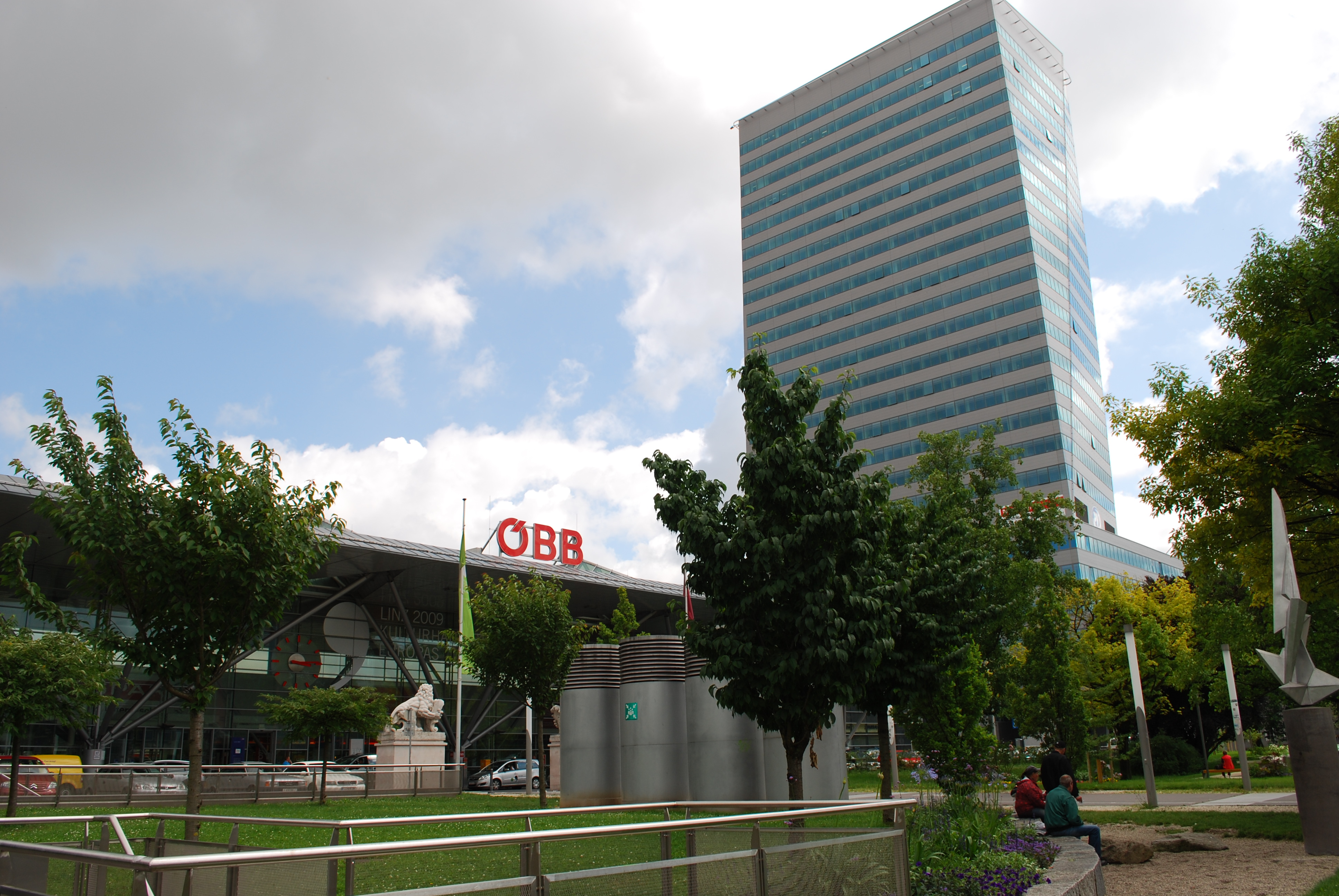
- Linz Hauptbahnhof

General information
- Location: Bahnhofplatz; 4020 Linz; Austria
- Coordinates: 48°17′26″N 14°17′28″E
- Elevation: 264 m (AA)
- Owner: Austrian Federal Railways (ÖBB)
- Operator: ÖBB; LILO
- Lines: Western Railway; Pyhrn Railway; Summerauer Railway; Linzer Lokalbahn (LILO)
- Platforms: 27
- Tracks: 12 for ÖBB; 2 for LILO
- Connections: Tram: Linz Linien; Bus: Linz Linien Postbus Welser regional buses

History
- Opened: 1858
Services
| Preceding station | | Following station |
|---|---|---|
| Wels Hbf toward München Hbf | WESTgreen | St. Pölten Hbf toward Wien Westbahnhof |
| Preceding station | DB Fernverkehr | Following station |
| Wels Hbf towards Dortmund Hbf, Berlin Gesundbrunnen or Hamburg-Altona | ICE 91 | St. Pölten Hbf towards Wien Hbf |
| Preceding station | ÖBB | Following station |
| Wels Hbf towards Zürich HB | Railjet Express | St. Pölten Hbf towards Bratislava hl.st. |
| Wels Hbf towards Zürich HB | Railjet Express | St. Pölten Hbf towards Vienna Airport |
| Wels Hbf towards Zürich HB | Railjet Express | St. Pölten Hbf towards Budapest Keleti |
| Wels Hbf towards München Hbf | Railjet Express | St. Pölten Hbf towards Wien Hbf |
| Wels Hbf towards München Hbf | Railjet Express | St. Pölten Hbf towards Budapest Keleti |
| Wels Hbf towards Innsbruck Hbf | Railjet Express | St. Pölten Hbf towards Vienna Airport |
| Wels Hbf towards Bregenz | Railjet Express | St. Pölten Hbf towards Vienna Airport |
| Wels Hbf towards Salzburg Hbf | Railjet | St. Valentin towards Wien Hbf |
| Wels Hbf towards Zürich HB or Stuttgart Hbf | EuroNight | St. Pölten Hbf towards Budapest Keleti |
| Wels Hbf towards Amsterdam Centraal or Hamburg-Altona | Nightjet | St. Pölten Hbf towards Wien Hbf |
| Wels Hbf towards Bregenz | Nightjet | Amstetten towards Wien Hbf |
| Wels Hbf towards Zürich HB or Venezia Santa Lucia | Nightjet | Amstetten towards Wien Hbf |
| Rohr-Bad Hall towards Bischofshofen | ÖBB-Urlaubsexpress Limited service | St. Pölten Hbf towards Wien Hbf |
| Terminus | EuroCity | Pregarten towards Praha hl.n. |
| Terminus | InterCity | Traun towards Graz Hbf |
| Attnang-Puchheim towards Stainach-Irdning | InterCity | St. Pölten Hbf towards Wien Hbf |
| Marchtrenk towards Passau Hbf | Regional-Express | Terminus |
| Marchtrenk towards Simbach (Inn) | Regional-Express | Terminus |
| Marchtrenk towards Wels Hbf | Regional-Express | Terminus |
| Terminus | Regional-Express | Traun towards Selzthal |
| Preceding station | PKP Intercity | Following station |
| Attnang-Puchheim towards München Hbf | EuroNight | St. Pölten Hbf towards Warszawa Wschodnia |
| Preceding station | Upper Austria S-Bahn | Following station |
| Terminus | S1 | Linz Ebelsberg towards Garsten |
| Leonding towards Wels Hbf | S2 | Terminus |
| Terminus | S3 | Linz Franckstraße towards Pregarten |
| Terminus | S4 | Linz Oed towards Kirchdorf |
| Untergaumberg towards Eferding | S5 | Terminus |
Location
- Location within Austria Location within Europe

Linz Hauptbahnhof or Linz Central Station is a railway station in Linz, the third largest city in Austria, and capital city of the federal state of Upper Austria. Opened in 1858, the station is the centrepiece of the Linz transport hub. It forms part of the Western Railway, and is also a terminus of the Pyhrn Railway, the Summerauer Railway, and the Linzer Lokalbahn (LILO). The station is owned by the Austrian Federal Railways (ÖBB); train services are operated by the ÖBB and the LILO. With 40,800 passengers daily in 2018/2019, it is the busiest station in Austria outside of Vienna, and the 7th-busiest overall.

Linz Hauptbahnhof is situated in Bahnhofplatz, near the southern edge of the city centre.

== History ==
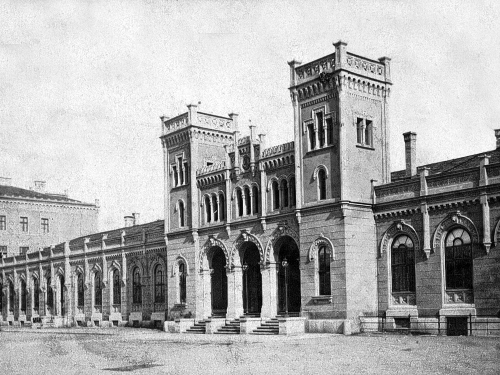
Linz's original central station building

The first Linz central station building was completed in 1858, to coincide with the arrival of the Empress Elisabeth Railway company's Western Railway from Vienna.

The station was rebuilt from 1936 by the Nazis - being the closest city to Adolf Hitler's birthplace - in a severe modernist style characterized by a reinforced concrete frame, high ceilings, and elongated windows. But by the time of its completion, Linz had already been designated one of five "Führer cities" where complete remodelling would take place. The site of the station in the remodelling plan was designated as the site of the Führermuseum, with the station to be moved four kilometres (2.5 mi) to the south at the opposite end of a new main boulevard. However, these remodelling plans never came to fruition, and with the rebuilt station building damaged by Allied bombing during World War II, the station was rebuilt for a second time between 1949-1955 in a contemporary sober style.

By the end of the twentieth century, it was no longer appropriate to the increasing requirements of contemporary public transport. Between 2002-2004, the rebuilt station building was completely replaced with a new building designed by Wilhelm Holzbauer. This redevelopment also added the Terminal Tower skyscraper as part of a mixed-use complex.

== Station building ==
The present station building is structured in three levels. The main entrance is at ground level, next to the taxi rank, and also provides the connection to the station's bus terminal.

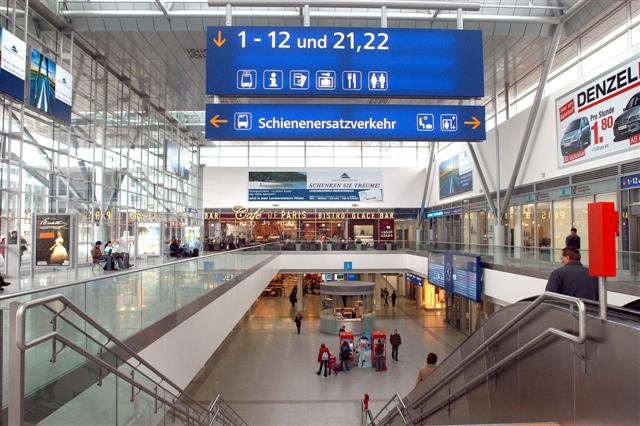
The current main hall

The bus terminal is used by Postbuses and some bus and trolleybus routes operated by Linz Linien. It is also used by the Welser company's regional buses, which connect Linz with the neighbouring communities of Traun and Ansfelden.

The railway platforms are accessible via the intermediate level of the building. Here, alongside the ÖBB ticket windows, information services, and the ÖBB club lounge, are shops and restaurants.

In the basement, there are stops for all three lines of the Linz tramway network, and an underground parking garage.

This building has repeatedly won the Verkehrsclub Österreich's award for the most popular and beautiful railway station in Austria, ahead of the central stations at Klagenfurt, Wiener Neustadt, and Wels.

== Train services ==
The station is served by the following services:

- Westbahn services Salzburg - Attnang Puchheim - Wels - Linz - Amstetten - St Pölten - Vienna
- Intercity Express services (ICE 91) Hamburg - Hanover - Kassel - Nürnberg - Passau - Linz - St Pölten - Vienna - Vienna Airport
- Intercity Express services (ICE 91) Dortmund - Essen - Düsseldorf - Cologne - Koblenz - Frankfurt - Nürnberg - Passau - Linz - St Pölten - Vienna - Vienna Airport
- RailJet services Zürich - Innsbruck - Salzburg - Linz - St Pölten - Vienna - Győr - Budapest
- RailJet services Munich - Salzburg - Linz - St Pölten - Vienna - Győr - Budapest

== Platforms ==
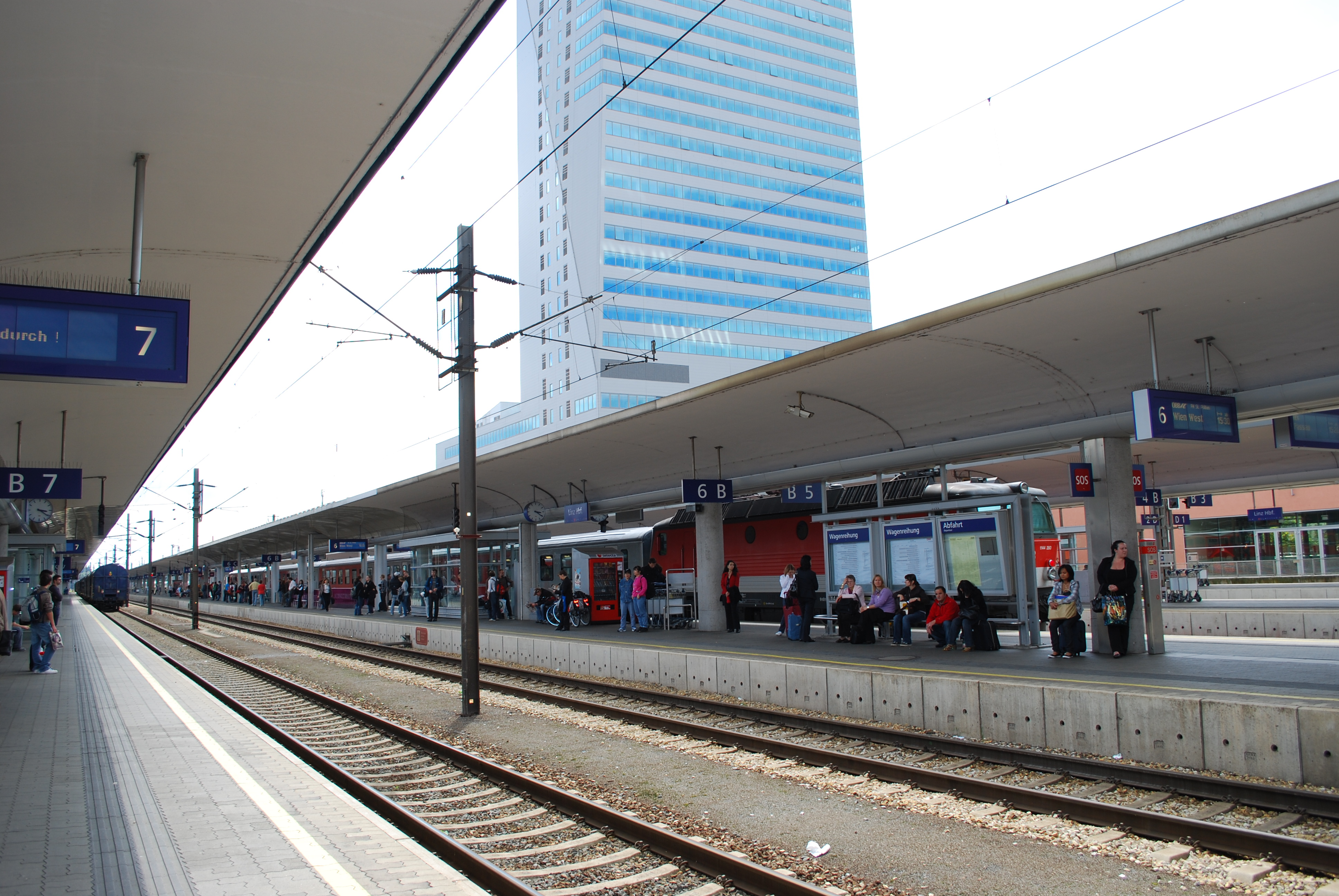
View of the platforms

As at 2015, Linz Hauptbahnhof had 14 operating station platforms, of which platforms 21 and 1 were allocated to Linzer Lokalbahn trains.

The platforms are of the latest design, to correspond with the requirements of the ÖBB's Bahnhofsoffensive. All are equipped with elevators or escalators. All platforms, except platform 22 are through platforms.

Platforms 21 and 22 are primarily used by the S-Bahn lines.

== Interchange ==
Following the Bahnhofsoffensive, some changes were visible in public transport interchange at Linz Hauptbahnhof.

=== Tram station ===
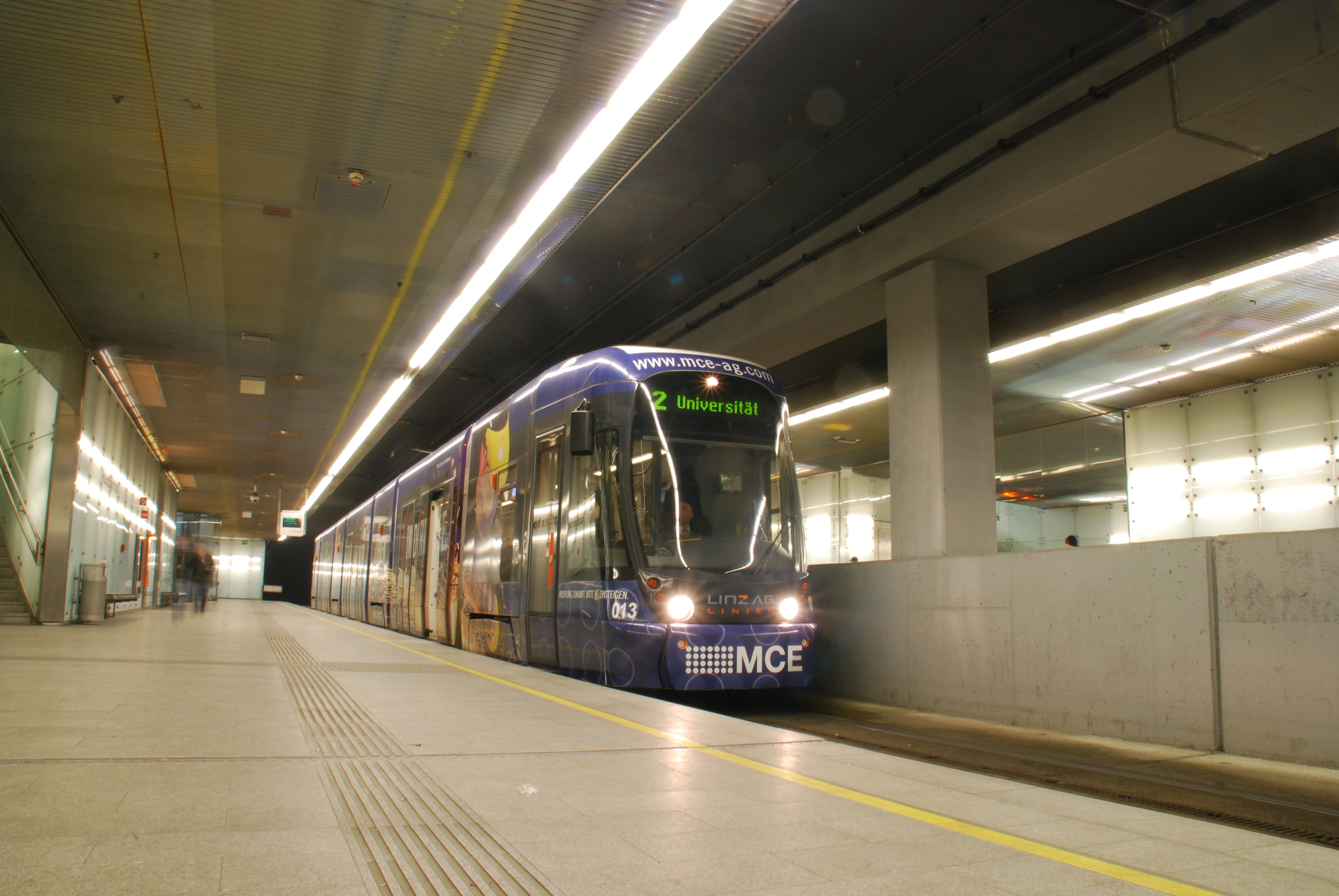
Cityrunner 013 in the tram station

Until 2004, the Hauptbahnhof was served only by line 3 of the Linz tram system. Lines 1 and 2 ran along the Wienerstraße, a short distance away. The Wienerstraße route has now been relocated underground between Goethekreuzung and Herz Jesu Kirche. By that new route, lines 1 and 2 now join line 3 in serving the Hauptbahnhof. The former above ground tram route between Blumauerplatz and Herz Jesu Kirche had been removed by 2009, and the streets were resurfaced. Thus, nothing now remains of the old route.

The Hauptbahnhof tram stop is now 86 m (282 ft) long and has space for 2 Cityrunner trams. Both ends of the station are fitted with reversing loops.

=== Bus terminal ===
In 2004, the bus terminal was built east of the Hauptbahnhof. The bus station is below the county offices (regional service centre) and is at ground level. In the bus terminal there are three long bus platforms, where the Linz AG Linien, Postbus und Wilhelm Welser Traun buses all stop. The bus terminal is a total of 200 m (656 ft) long and 50 m (164 ft) wide.

== See also ==
- History of rail transport in Austria
- Rail transport in Austria
