= Wels Hauptbahnhof =

Railway station in Upper Austria

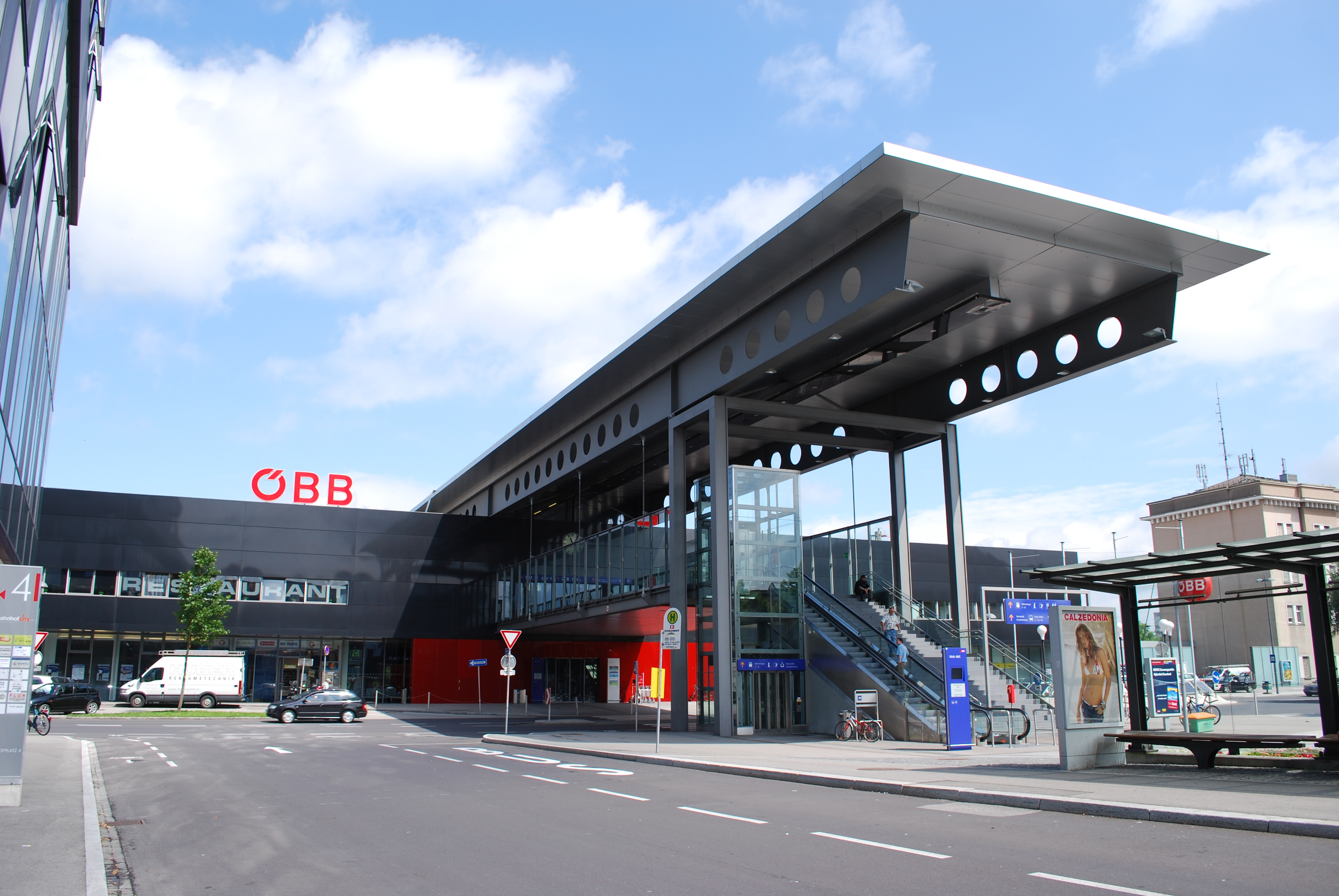
- The station building

General information
- Location: Bahnhofstraße; 4600 Wels; Austria
- Coordinates: 48°9′56″N 14°1′36″E
- Owner: Austrian Federal Railways (ÖBB)
- Operator: ÖBB
- Lines: Western Railway; Wels–Passau railway Alm Valley railway Aschach railway
- Platforms: 7 through platforms 4 bay platforms
- Connections: Bus: Wels buses Postbuses

Construction
- Architect: Franz Maul; Maximiliam Lugner

History
- Opened: 1851
- Rebuilt: 1937, 1945, 2003-2005
Services
Preceding station	DB Fernverkehr	Following station
Passau Hbf towards Dortmund Hbf, Hamburg-Altona or Berlin Gesundbrunnen	ICE 91	Linz Hbf towards Wien Hbf
Preceding station	ÖBB	Following station
Attnang-Puchheim towards Salzburg Hbf	Railjet	Linz Hbf towards Wien Hbf
Attnang-Puchheim towards Stuttgart Hbf	InterCity	Linz Hbf towards Wien Hbf
Passau Hbf towards Amsterdam Centraal or Hamburg-Altona	Nightjet	Linz Hbf towards Wien Hbf
Attnang-Puchheim towards Zürich HB or Venezia Santa Lucia	Nightjet	Linz Hbf towards Wien Hbf
Attnang-Puchheim towards Bregenz	Nightjet	Linz Hbf towards Wien Hbf
Bad Schallerbach-Wallern towards Passau Hbf	Regional-Express	Marchtrenk towards Linz Hbf
Bad Schallerbach-Wallern towards Simbach (Inn)	Regional-Express	Marchtrenk towards Linz Hbf
Terminus	Regional-Express	Marchtrenk towards Linz Hbf
Wels Lokalbahn towards Grünau im Almtal	Regionalzug	Terminus
Preceding station	Upper Austria S-Bahn	Following station
Terminus	S2	Marchtrenk towards Linz Hbf
Location
- Location within Austria Location within Europe

Wels Hauptbahnhof, occasionally Wels Central Station or Wels central station is a railway station at Wels, which is the second largest city in the federal state of Upper Austria, in the north of Austria.

Opened in 1851, the station is owned and operated by the Austrian Federal Railways (ÖBB). It forms part of the Western Railway, and is also a junction of the Wels–Passau railway, the Alm Valley railway, and the Aschach railway.

== Location ==
Wels Hauptbahnhof is situated in the Bahnhofstraße, at the northwestern edge of the city centre.

== History ==
On 1 April 1835, the Budweis–Linz–Gmunden horse-drawn railway was opened. Its route included Wels. In addition to people, it transported salt from the Salzkammergut to Linz, or further to Bohemia. The horse-drawn railway passed directly through the Wels city centre. However, as early as 1855 the horses were replaced by steam locomotives. From that time, the line contracted to the section between Linz and Gmunden, because the horse-drawn railway's northern section was not suited to the locomotives.

In 1851, the Western Railway was opened from Vienna to Salzburg and Passau, and the Wels station building was moved. The new station building was constructed in the Romantic style. It consisted of an elongated central section with corner pavilions at both ends. At that time, the station had only four tracks.

When the Passau railway was planned, it was decided that its terminus would be Wels instead of Linz. This decision made the Wels station a major railway hub. In 1860, the Passau line went into operation.

In 1886, the line to Aschach was opened; this line branched off the Passau line only in Haiding, but the trains continued to Wels. In 1893, the Alm Valley railway opened, and this line similarly terminated in Wels, before continuing via Sattledt to Rohr im Kremstal, where the Alm Valley railway and the Pyhrn railway met each other. In 1901, the Alm Valley railway was extended to Grünau im Almtal. Due to the increase in traffic associated with the opening of these lines, Wels Hauptbahnhof had to be enlarged.

After World War I, there were already plans for improvement. The Deutsche Reichsbahn took over the expansion of Passau line, which was completed in the autumn of 1938. Not far from the station, a marshalling yard was opened. In 1937, the station was rebuilt.

During World War II, the station suffered heavy air attacks. In its reconstruction in 1945, the station missed out on the chance to take on a new look. The island platforms with pedestrian underpass were constructed only in 1959. Above the station, there had been a bridge linking Wels with the Neustadt district; in the same year it was replaced by an underpass.

In 1992 the Wels signal box was built. East of the station, a "Rolling highway" was opened, to transport trucks by train between Wels and Mainz. Now such trains run from Wels to many European cities. In 2003, the station was completely rebuilt within the framework of the ÖBB's Bahnhofsoffensive. In 2005 this work was completed.

== Station building ==
The station building is divided into three levels:

- In the first (ground) level are a post office, a flower shop and a café, a tobacconist, newspaper and book shop and two ticket machines.
- The second level (1st floor) houses a mobile phone shop, internet shop, a hairdresser, a bakery, a restaurant, a ticketing system and the ÖBB travel centre.
- In the third level (2nd floor), there are public toilets and access to the pedestrian bridge over the platforms.

== Train services ==
The station is served by the following services:

- Intercity Express services (ICE 91) Hamburg - Hanover - Kassel - Nürnberg - Passau - Linz - St Pölten - Vienna - Vienna Airport
- Intercity Express services (ICE 91) Dortmund - Essen - Düsseldorf - Cologne - Koblenz - Frankfurt - Nürnberg - Passau - Linz - St Pölten - Vienna - Vienna Airport
- RailJet services Zürich - Innsbruck - Salzburg - Linz - St Pölten - Vienna - Győr - Budapest
- RailJet services Munich - Salzburg - Linz - St Pölten - Vienna - Győr - Budapest

== Platforms ==
Wels Hauptbahnhof has seven through tracks (track 1, 2, 3, 4, 5, 6 and 8) and four bay platforms (tracks 7a, 7b, 11 and 12).

The bridge from the station building over the platforms also links the station with the Neustadt district on the other side of the tracks. It has three entrances to each platform (elevator and two flights of stairs or escalators) except for platforms 1 and 11, 12.

== Interchange ==
The station has a bus terminal served by Wels local buses and Postbuses.

== See also ==
- History of rail transport in Austria
- Rail transport in Austria
