= Western Railway (Austria) =

Coordinates: 48°11′49″N 16°20′14″E

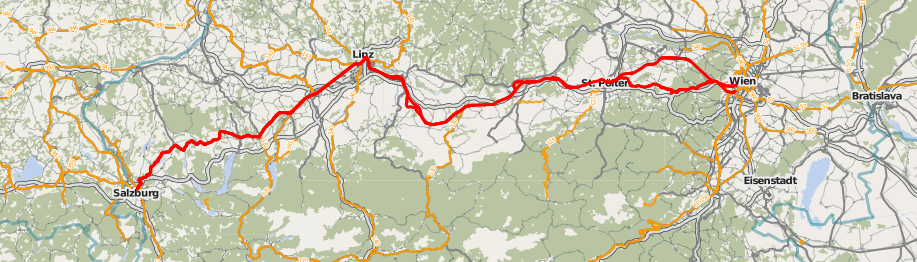

Overview
- Other names: Old Western Railway (Alte Westbahn): Wien Westbf – Kn. Wagram – (GZU) – Linz Hbf – Salzburg Hbf; New Western Railway (Neue Westbahn): (Wien Meidling – Bf. Tullnerfeld) – Kn. Wagram – St. Pölten – Linz Hbf
- Native name: Westbahn
- Line number: Route 1 (Old Western Railway): 2011, 2012, 2013, 2014, 2015, 2016, 2017, 4011, 4012, 4013, 4014, 4015; Route 30 (New Western Railway): 2305, 2306, 2307, 4301; Route 3 (relief track): 2035, 1036; Route 23 (suburban track): 2231

Technical
- Line length: 312.2 km (194.0 mi)
- Track gauge: 1,435 mm (4 ft 8 1/2 in) standard gauge
- Minimum radius: 247 m
- Electrification: 15 kV 16.7 Hz AC
- Operating speed: 250 km/h (155 mph)
- Maximum incline: 1.3%

The Western Railway (German: Westbahn) is a two-track, partly four-track, electrified railway line in Austria that runs from Vienna to Salzburg via St. Pölten and Linz Hauptbahnhof and is one of the major lines of Austria. It was originally opened as the Empress Elisabeth Railway in 1858 (Vienna–Linz). The line is owned and operated by Austrian Federal Railways (ÖBB).

== Routes ==
The Western Railway consists of the double-track Old Western Railway (Alten Westbahn, line 1) and the double-track New Western Railway (Neuen Westbahn, line 30).

For operational reasons the Western Railway is supplemented by the suburban track (line 23) from Vienna Hütteldorf to Unter Purkersdorf and the relief track (line 3) from Pottenbrunn via St. Pölten to Prinzersdorf.

== History ==
The line was opened from Vienna Westbahnhof to Linz on 15 December 1858 and was extended to Salzburg on 1 August 1860. The continuation to Munich was opened on 12 August 1860. The line was built by the k.k. privilegierte Kaiserin Elisabeth-Bahn ("Imperial and Royal privileged Empress Elisabeth Railway", KEB) company under Hermann Dietrich Lindheim. In addition to the Vienna–Salzburg line, it also built the Wels–Passau Railway (1861) and the St. Valentin–Summerau–České Budějovice line (1872).

=== Opening ===
The line was authorised under a treaty contracted by Bavaria and Austria in 1851. The Vienna–Linz section was completed in 1858 and the rest of the line to Salzburg was opened for traffic in 1860. The trip from Vienna to Salzburg initially took nine hours. A few weeks before the official opening Empress Elizabeth used the line to travel to her home in Bavaria. Emperor Franz Joseph and Maximilian II of Bavaria were present at the official opening on the line on 12 August 1860.

=== Nationalisation ===
In 1884 the railway was nationalised. The extension of the railway line on Austrian territory, the Salzburg-Tyrol Railway ("Gisela Railway") via Zell am See to Wörgl (owned by the KEB since 1875) was also nationalised.

=== Upgrading ===
Duplication of the line was completed on 14 August 1902; it had been gradual: Linz–Wels on 7 August 1870, St. Valentin–Linz on 22 August 1874, Wels–Lambach on 1 November 1898, Lambach–Attnang-Puchheim on 14 August 1899 and Attnang-Puchheim–Salzburg on 14 August 1902.

As a result of Austria's loss of coal reserves at the end of the First World War under the Treaty of Saint-Germain-en-Laye, it was decided to electrify the line, starting from the west. Electification was completed to Steindorf on 3 October 1938, to Attnang-Puchheim on 6 October 1941, to Linz on 15 May 1949, and to Amstetten on 28 June 1951. Electification of the line was completed with the inauguration of the Amstetten–Vienna West station section on 19 December 1952.

Numerous enhancements and additions were made during the period of management of operations by Deutsche Reichsbahn (during the annexation by Germany from 1938 to 1945). Thus, the passing loops at Hutten and Ederbauer were built and a new marshalling yard was built in Wels (to the north of the Western Railway). Also, the construction of a second marshalling yard in Wels was started (to the south of the Western Railway), but it was left unfinished at the end of the war. This was intended to give Wels marshalling yards serving traffic running both west–east (today's yard) and east–west (the abandoned yard). The Linz East marshalling yard was given a large expansion as a result of the establishment of the "Hermann Göring Works" (now Voestalpine) by the Reichswerke Hermann Göring.

At a press conference in 1983 Austrian Transport Minister Karl Lausecker outlined details of plans for the development of the Western Railway. Construction was expected to start in 1987, with completion in 1992. New sections would be built between Attnang-Puchheim and Salzburg; upgraded sections would be built between St. Pölten and Linz and between Linz and Attnang-Puchheim. The planned top speed was 250 km/h.

The Sittenberg Tunnel was opened as the first new section in 1994. The Lambach bypass, including the Kalvarienberg Tunnel, was opened in 1995. The realignment of the Breitenschützing–Schwanenstadt section, including the Römerberg Tunnel, followed in 1997. Three years later, two sections, St. Pölten–Prinzersdorf and Groß Sierning–Pöchlarn, including the Rohr “green” tunnel (that is built in order to protect the environment), the Wachberg II Tunnel and the Melk Tunnel, were released for operations at 200 km/h. Only a few months later, in 2001, this was followed by the opening of the Prinzersdorf–Groß Sierning and St. Peter-Seitenstetten–St. Valentin (including the St. Peter Green Tunnel and the Sieberg Tunnel) sections. Since the opening of the Amstetten–St. Peter-Seitenstetten section in 2003, trains can run continuously from Amstetten to St. Valentine at 200 km/h. In 2004, two junctions were built at Wagram and Rohr and finally in 2007 the Enns bypass (St. Valentin–Asten) was opened to traffic. As part of the rebuilding of St. Pölten Hauptbahnhof the double-bore Eisbergbogen tunnels (a single track tunnel for a passing track and a double track tunnel for the two main tracks) were built west of St. Pölten and opened to traffic in 2010.

== Old Western Railway (route 1) ==
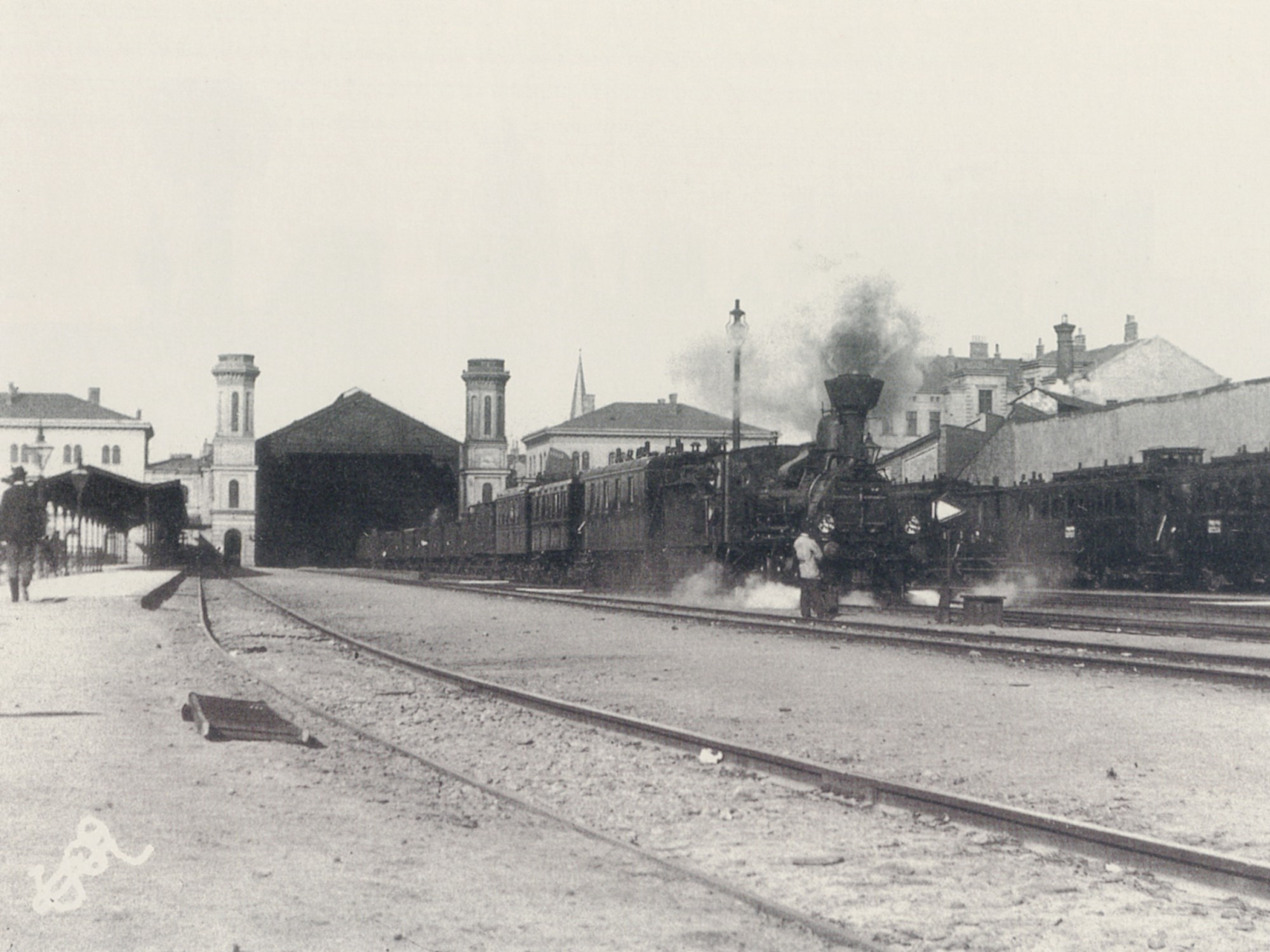
Departure of the royal train from Vienna West station in 1895

The line begins in Vienna West station (Westbahnhof) and first runs through the Vienna Woods (Wienerwald). The Old Western Railway to St. Pölten has now been replaced from Wagram junction to Rohr junction by the New Western Railway. After the completion of the freight railway bypass closing the "St. Pölten–Loosdorf gap" from Wagram junction to Rohr junction the newly constructed freight bypass will form part of the Old West Railway.

After Rohr junction the Western Railway runs through the foothills via Pöchlarn (a junction with the Erlauf Valley Railway to Kienberg-Gaming), Amstetten, St. Valentin (a junction with Rudolf's Railway up the Enns valley via Steyr and Selzthal to Bischofshofen) and Enns to Linz, where the line through the Mühlviertel to České Budějovice (Summerau Railway) and the Pyhrn Railway branch off. There is also a connection in Linz to the Linz Local Railway to Eferding. After Linz the Western Railway moves away from the Danube. While the Danube flows from the northwest to Linz, the Western Railway now heads off to the southwest towards Wels.

The Western Railway to Salzburg and the line to Passau separate in Wels station. The Alm Valley Railway to Grünau im Almtal also branches off here. The next junction is at Attnang-Puchheim, where it crosses the Salzkammergut Railway running from Stainach–Irdning to Ried. After Straßwalchen where the Mattig Valley Railway branches off to Braunau, the line continues to Salzburg station, where the Western Railway ends.

== New Western Railway (route 30) ==
=== Vienna–St. Pölten ===
The new Vienna–St. Pölten section of the New Western Railway is a high-speed railway. It runs from Vienna via Tullnerfeld to St. Pölten and is part of the TEN project No. 17 "Magistrale for Europe". The section was put into scheduled operation on 9 December 2012. The travel time without stopping between Vienna West station and St. Pölten was reduced as a result from 41 to 25 minutes.

The new section of the New Western Railway begins at the exit of Wien Meidling station and runs through the Lainz Tunnel, which leads directly to Hadersdorf junction. Up to that point the traditional link to and from the Old Western Railway can be operated at 160 km/h (99 mph). The start of the high-speed line at the entrance of the Vienna Woods Tunnel is west of Hadersdorf junction. From this point, the line can be run at up to 250 km/h (160 mph). The line resurfaces after 13 km at Chorherrn near to the Tulln Basin.

The regional station of Tullnerfeld is situated in the Tulln Basin. The high-speed line has been connected to the Franz Josef Railway by the reactivation of disused Tulln western curve, promoting regional traffic. After passing through three cut-and-cover tunnels that were built for noise abatement reasons in an open cutting, the line runs through three more tunnels, known as the Perschling tunnel chain (Tunnelkette Perschling). The line then runs to Wagram junction in St. Pölten, which now forms the end of the new Western line.

Simultaneously with the construction of the new high-speed line, the railway stations in Vienna and St. Pölten are being rebuilt. Vienna Hauptbahnhof was opened on 9 December 2012 for partial operations and was fully completed in 2015. St. Pölten station was rebuilt at the end of 2011.

=== Rohr junction‒Ybbs an der Donau ===
Immediately following St. Pölten station runs through a right-hand bend, which can be run at up to 80 km/h, a short straight section and a left-hand curve through the 460 metres-long Eisbergbogen Tunnel, which was newly built in 2010/11 and which can be run through at 160 km/h. At the end of the curve, Linienzugbeeinflussung (LZB) signalling starts, allowing operations at 200 km/h. The line here has three tracks (including the congestion track between St. Pölten Hbf and Prinzersdorf south of the two-track main line, with its own tube through the Eisbergbogen Tunnel) to Prinzersdorf, then two tracks through the Markersdorf an der Pielach station to Rohr junction, where it fans from two to four tracks. Here the Old Western Railway branches to the northwest to Loosdorf station, while the New Western Railway runs to the south of the town through a “green” tunnel. To the northwest of Loosdorf the two lines come within a few metres of each other before the new line takes a slight curve to the left to the entrance of the Wachberg 2 Tunnel. Shortly after its western portal it runs through the Melk Tunnel, which takes its name from the nearby town. Immediately afterwards it runs over a bridge over a small river before turning to run parallel with the old line, which has been rebuilt on the new alignment. Now, the two parallel lines run through Pöchlarn station until the new line takes a slight curve to the left to enter the almost 5 km long Sittenberg Tunnel. Shortly after the western portal the new and old lines come together again and, about 2 km later, reach Ybbs an der Donau station, where the maximum speed is cut to 160 km/h. The two-track line section between Ybbs and Amstetten is expected to be rebuilt as four tracks by 2016.

=== Amstetten–Linz Kleinmünchen ===
From Amstetten station, the Western Railway runs as four tracks again and with the recommencement of LZB long-distance traffic can accelerate to 200 km/h after the sharp left turn at the western exit to the station, which restricts speeds to 160 km/h. The Old and New Western Railways run parallel as far as St. Peter-Seitenstetten, before the new line makes a tighter curve than the existing route through the St. Peter “green” tunnel. At St. Johann-Weistrach the two lines run for a few hundred meters next to each other again. After the station, the Old Western Railway runs towards Haag, while the New Western Railway takes a right turn to a straight section and then runs to the north through the 6.5 km long Sieberg Tunnel. At the northern portal, the two lines meet and again run parallel to each other to St. Valentin station. After the station, the new line enters the “Enns bypass”, which can be operated at 230 km/h (140 mph), running around the area of the port and the settled areas of Enns. (In 2005, in the course of the upgrade to four tracks between Ennsdorf and Enns, a junction was built towards Mauthausen, allowing direct operations of trains from Linz towards the Danube Bank Railway). Near Asten, the Old and New Western Railways come together again. From Asten-Fisching 1 junction the speed limit is reduced to 200 km/h (120 mph) on the two parallel lines to Linz Kleinmünchen, the current end of the four-track section on the Western Railway.

=== Signalling ===
The New Western Railway has been equipped with the European Train Control System (ETCS) on the newly built section of the line from Vienna to Wagram junction. The so-called “registration” (Anmelde) line starts at the entrance to Lainz Tunnel, which is equipped with both ETCS and with the old Punktförmige Zugbeeinflussung (PZB) system. From Hadersdorf junction it was originally intended that the line be exclusively signalled with ETCS level 2, but it was decided to have PZB as a fallback. It is possible to run from St. Pölten to Attnang-Puchheim at 230 km/h using LZB signalling.

== Importance and development of the line ==
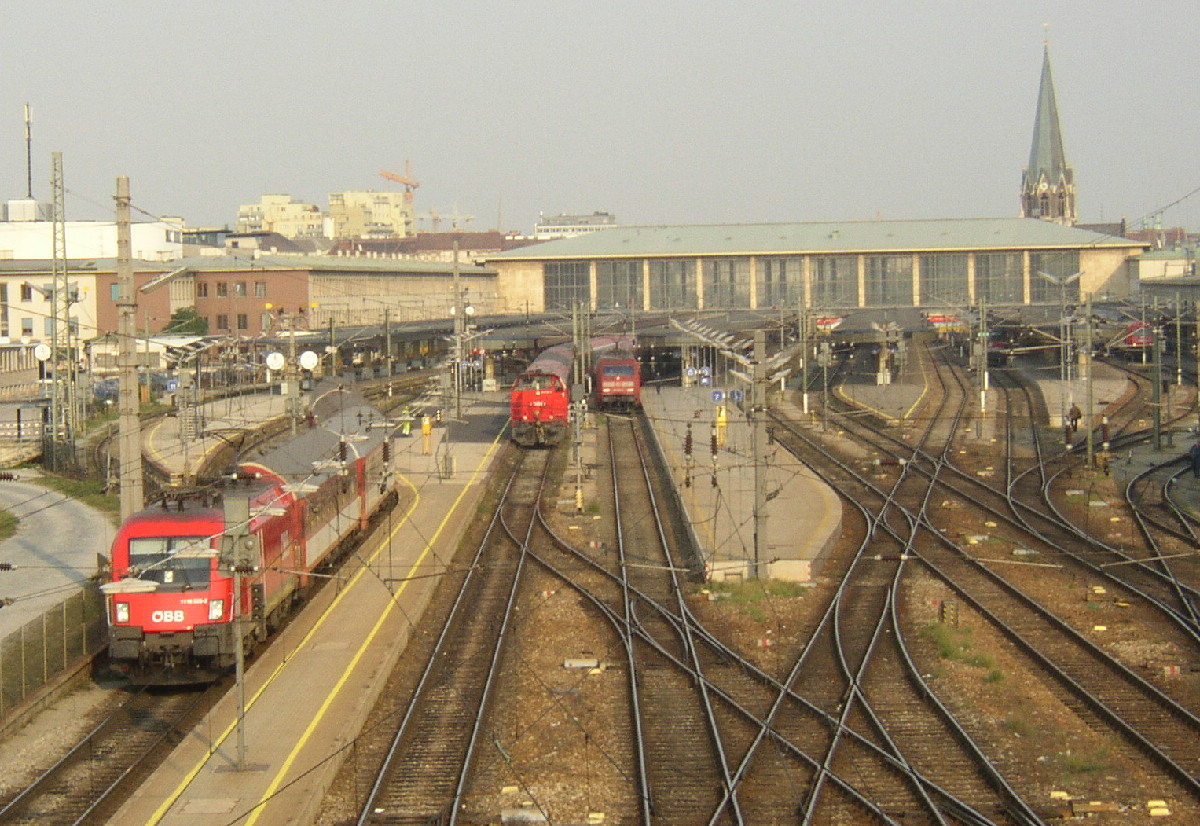
Vienna West station in October 2005

The Western Railway, along with the Southern Railway, are the main arteries of the Austrian railways. With EU enlargement, their importance continues to grow. Not only is a large part of the Austrian National rail traffic on the western railway line, but long-distance services between Vienna and cities such as Hamburg, Dortmund, Cologne, Frankfurt, Munich and Zurich also run on the Western Railway.

The Western Railway is an important section of the TEN line between Paris and Bratislava and Budapest. In the long term there are expected to be direct services on these routes with modern high-speed train sets.

=== Upgrade to 2010 ===
Since 1990 the capacity of the line has been increased by the creation of a high-speed line. The existing two-track line is being upgraded to provide high capacity and in addition a new double track line is being built between St. Pölten and Linz, together creating a four-track line. The new sections are designed with many new tunnels and straight sections of track to allow speeds of up to 250 km/h. This upgraded condition of the line has allowed ICE T services to run from Vienna to Frankfurt, Munich and Bregenz since the timetable change in 2006 in Austria and Railjet services to run between Budapest, Vienna, Munich and Zurich since the timetable change in December 2008.

=== Upgrade to 2014 ===
The travel time from Vienna to Innsbruck was four and half hours before the timetable change on 9 December 2012; at the timetable change the duration was reduced to four hours and 15 minutes. The upgrading of the line is aimed at achieving the so-called "1-2-3-scheme", that is the journey from Vienna to Linz will be only an hour, Salzburg would be two hours away and Munich and Innsbruck would be three hours from Vienna.

On 9 December 2012, two new sections were opened: the new Vienna–St. Pölten section (journey time reduction ≈ 15 min) and the New Lower Inn Valley railway from Radfeld to Baumkirchen (journey time reduction ≈ 5 min). These sections are operated at 230 or 220 km/h. Here, the winding and mountainous section of track through the Vienna Woods was supplemented with a new route through Tullnerfeld (Vienna Woods Tunnel and the Perschling tunnel chain) that rejoins the route of the Old Western Railway at St. Pölten.

Following the upgrade of the last section of the double-track Old Western Railway between Wels and Attnang-Puchheim, namely the Lambach–Breitenschützing section, it now has a high level of performance and since October 2012, trains are able to run on it at 230 km/h. The old line on the Lambach–Breitenschützing section is being rebuilt and is expected to return to service in July 2013. Speeds on other already upgraded sections, such as St. Valentin–Linz Kleinmünchen, were increased from 200 to 230 km/h in December 2012.

As Vienna West station is a terminus, trains to Vienna and continuing to the east (for example, to Budapest) must currently change direction in the West station. After the start of operations through the Lainz Tunnel on 9 December 2012, which connects the New Western Railway route through Tullnerfeld directly to the mainline tracks of the new Vienna Hauptbahnhof (to open in 2014), long-distance trains will mostly run there. WESTbahn has however announced that its trains from Salzburg to Vienna will continue to run to the West station.

=== Outlook ===
The four-track Ybbs an der Donau–Amstetten section, which is designed for a maximum of 250 km/h came into operation in 2015. The reconstruction of the east end of Amstetten station to increase top speed from Ybbs to 230 km/h continued until 2016. In 2017, the St. Pölten freight bypass railway (Wagram junction–Rohr junction), which is designed for a maximum speed of 120 km/h, will be opened to traffic. The four-track upgrade from Linz Kleinmünchen to the eastern approach to Linz station is expected to be completed no earlier than 2018.

It is expected that the whole Western Railway from Vienna to Wels will have four continuous tracks in 2021, but it will not consist of a four-track line, but it will rather be two double track lines that are operationally linked at several points.

A further four track upgrade is planned for the 20 km section between Neumarkt and Salzburg Kasern. Various possible routes have been examined. The upgrade is necessary because this section is used by additional services of line S2 of the Salzburg S-Bahn. On 10 January 2013 the fixed route selected for the Neumarkt–Salzburg Kasern section was presented with a start expected in less than 20 years.

The upgrade to four tracks is also currently being planned for the Linz–Wels section and planning is continuing on the second stage of the New Lower Inn Valley railway (Schaftenau–Kundl).
