= Wien Westbahnhof railway station =

Railway station in Vienna, Austria

Wien Westbahnhof
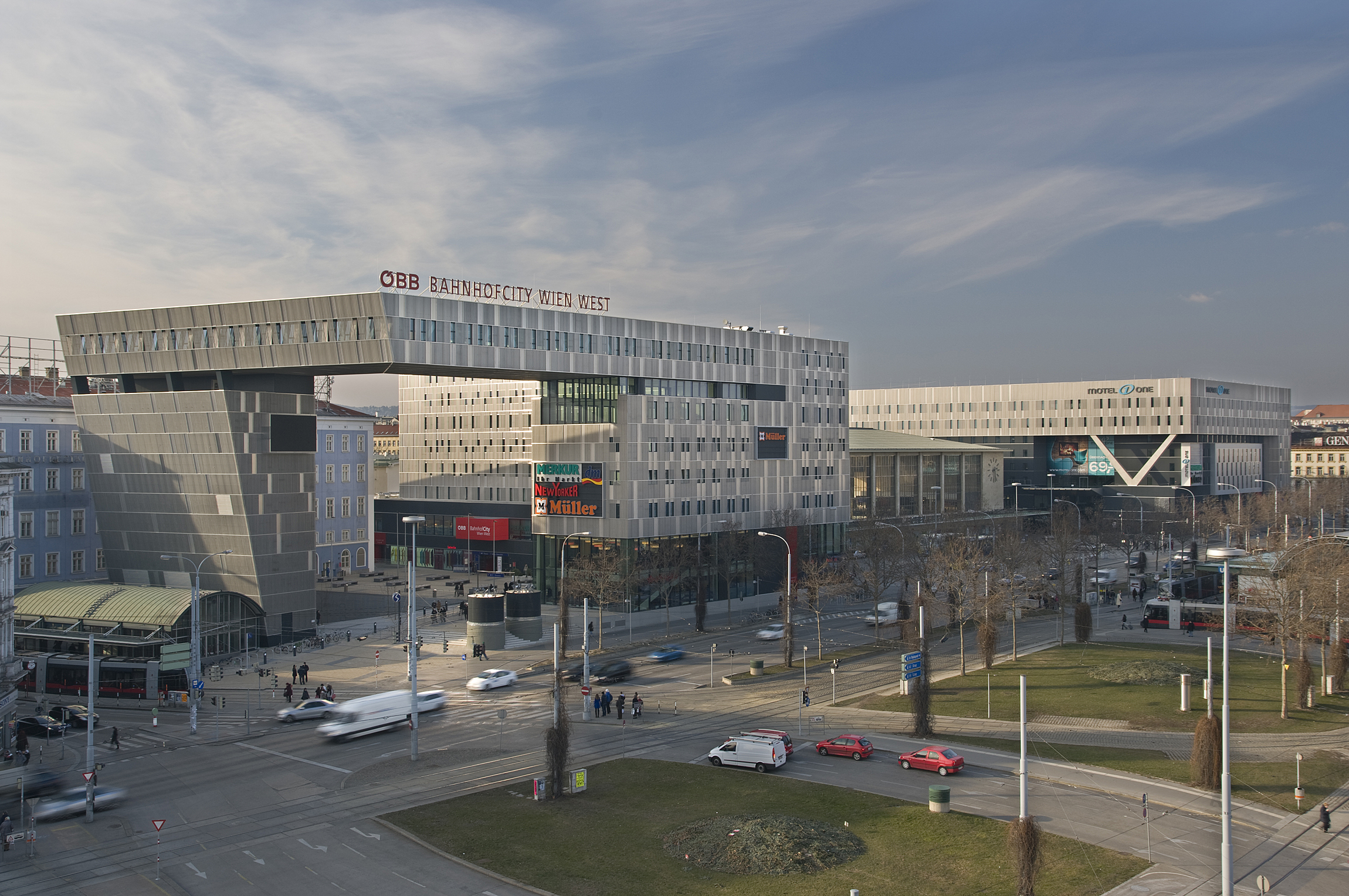
- The fully renovated Westbahnhof with the BahnhofCity in 2011

General information
- Location: Europaplatz 2; 1150 Vienna; Austria
- Coordinates: 48°11′48″N 16°20′16″E
- Owner: Austrian Federal Railways (ÖBB)
- Operator: Austrian Federal Railways (ÖBB)
- Line: West railway
- Tracks: 11
- Connections: 5 6 9 18 52 60 N6 N49 N54 N64 VAL Flixbus

History
- Opened: 1858
- Rebuilt: 1949–1952
Services
Preceding station	ÖBB	Following station
Wien Hütteldorf towards Amstetten	CJX 5	Terminus
Wien Hütteldorf towards St. Pölten Hbf	REX 51	Terminus
Preceding station		Following station
Wien Hütteldorf toward Innsbruck Hbf	WESTblue	Terminus
Wien Hütteldorf toward München Hbf	WESTgreen	Terminus
Preceding station	Vienna S-Bahn	Following station
Wien Penzing towards Neulengbach	S50	Terminus
Location
- Location within Vienna

Wien Westbahnhof (Vienna West station) is a major Austrian railway station, the original starting point of the West railway (Westbahn) and a former terminus of international rail services. In 2015, its role changed with the opening of Vienna's new main station and Westbahnhof is now mainly a commuter station and the terminus of private rail operator Westbahn's intercity service from Bregenz and Munich. Locally, Wien Westbahnhof is served by S-Bahn line S50 and U-Bahn lines U3 and U6. Six tram lines converge on Europaplatz in front of the station, although none go into the city centre. There are also buses to the airport.

== Location ==
Westbahnhof is in Vienna's 15th District (Rudolfsheim-Fünfhaus) on the Gürtel (inner-city ring road). Mariahilfer Strasse to the immediate south-east provides a direct route into the center of the city.

== Significance ==
Westbahnhof is one of the busiest stations in Vienna and used to be one of the several termini for international trains in the city. With the 2015 opening of Wien Hauptbahnhof, all long-distance services of the state-owned Austrian Federal Railways (ÖBB) were transferred to that station, although private operator WESTbahn maintains its intercity service from Bregenz and Munich via Salzburg. At the same time, the frequency of fast regional service along the West Railway was increased.

The station is also the departure point for all regional rail lines into the west of Vienna that are included in the Eastern Regional Traffic Authority and belong in part to the Viennese S-Bahn.

As some facilities of the station are no longer needed after its demotion, a reduction in the station's size is to be expected, and concepts for the utilisation of the surplus space are already being considered.

== History ==
=== 1858 to 1949 ===
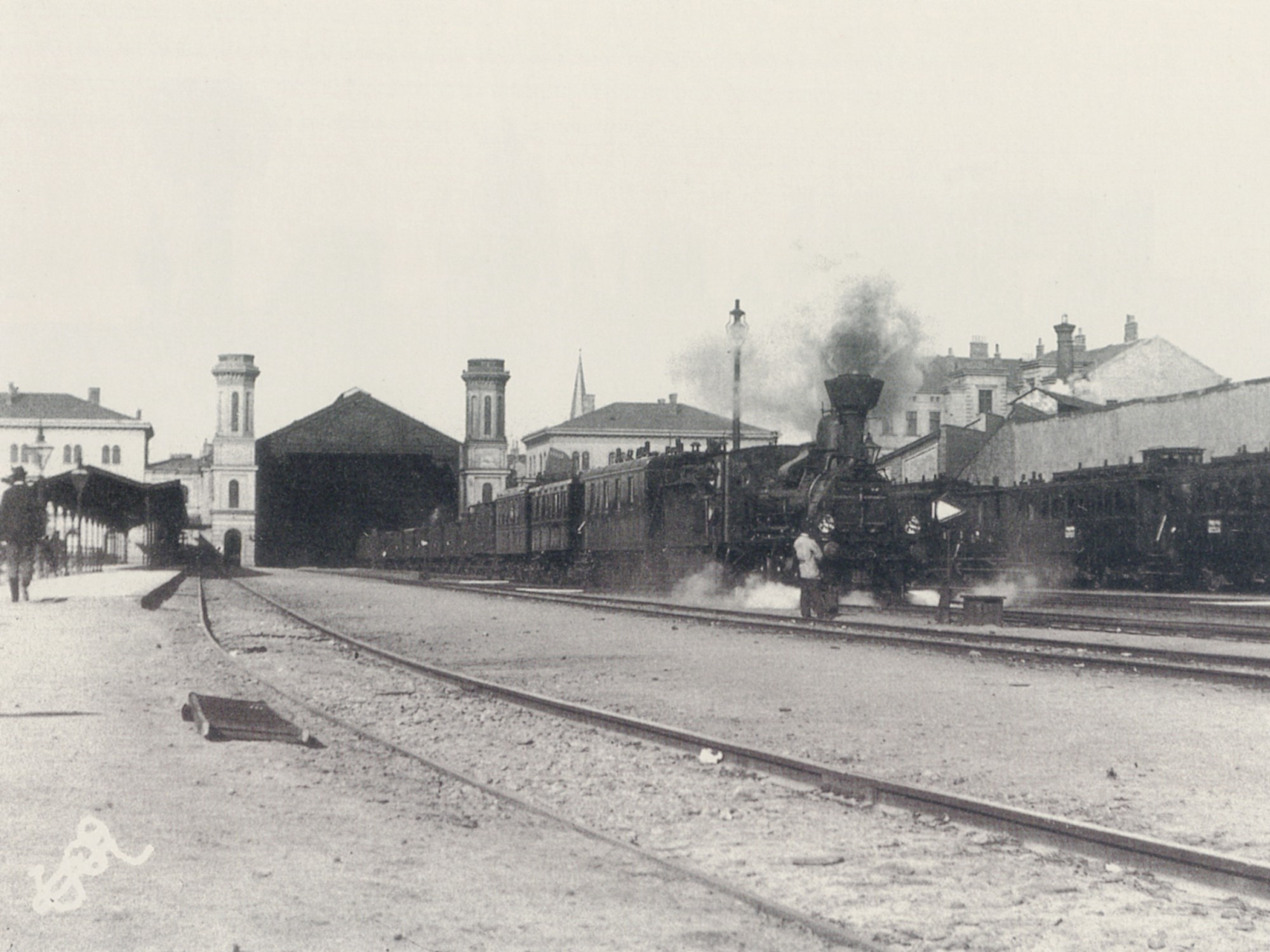
The Westbahnhof in Vienna, 1895

Built for the western railway (originally called the k.k. privilegierte Kaiserin-Elisabeth-Bahn), the station was designed by the architect Moritz Löhr and opened in 1858. The facility was made up of four sections built in a historical style.

The main hall was originally 104 metres (341 ft 2 in) long and 27.2 metres (89 ft 3 in) wide. It was covered by a beamed iron awning and provided space for four tracks. Intervening peninsular platforms were not yet available. The exit from the hall was flanked by two towers. On the east, a two-story administration building separated the trackage from the Gürtel.

The side wings included provisions for arrivals and departures. The southerly departure side consisted of an ornamented portal with steps and three large arches supported by columns, that were crowned with statues. Access passages to the left and right of these led to the two two-storey office buildings. Through this portal, one enters the ticket hall and the departure platform. On slightly elevated terrain, the departure side offered the most impressive view of the station from the southeast. This motif was repeated in the northerly arrival side; however because of the grade, the building's foundation was lower and the portal was not built up as high, as arcades offered passengers who were waiting for carriages or carts protection from the elements.

In order to deal with the increased number of passengers, the two towers that flanked the departure gate were moved further apart in a modification that lasted from 1910 to 1912. The roof construction was also changed and space for a fifth track was attained. In addition, further covered platforms and departure tracks were provided in the foreground of the tracks in the terminal proper.

In April 1945, the station was hit by bombs and burned down in the course of the Vienna offensive, at the end of World War II; the roof of the gallery collapsed. After the end of the war, the buildings were by necessity adapted for the needs of rail travel, but a complete reconstruction was decided upon, so the station was torn down in 1949.

A statue of namesake of the original railway Empress Elisabeth from the original facade of the station still recalls the old station in the lower hall of the new Westbahnhof.

=== Since 1949 ===
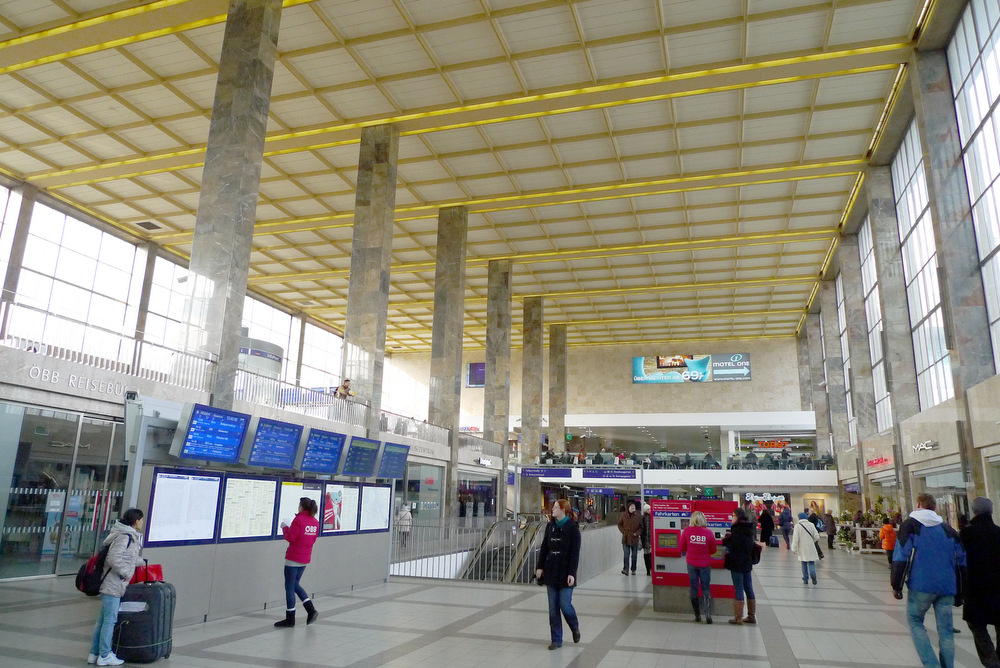
The listed ticket hall after renovation in 2011

The rebuilt Westbahnhof was designed by Architects Hartiger & Wöhnhart and opened in 1952. Because only narrow administration wings were built on the sides, space was available for eleven tracks in all, accessed from covered peninsular platforms.

The centerpiece of the rebuilt Westbahnhof is the large hall giving on to the Gürtel (Europaplatz), which is divided into a lower and an upper level that is reached by two flights of stairs and escalators. The hall is lighted by high windows that are built into the east and west facades above the platform overhangs. The ticket windows are installed beneath the upper hall. Later on, a pavilion was built in the lower hall that offered a service centre for bookings, hotel reservations and the like. In the 1980s a parking garage was erected on the north side of the station.

The Westbahnhof, with its half-timbered roof construction, enjoys protected-monument status.

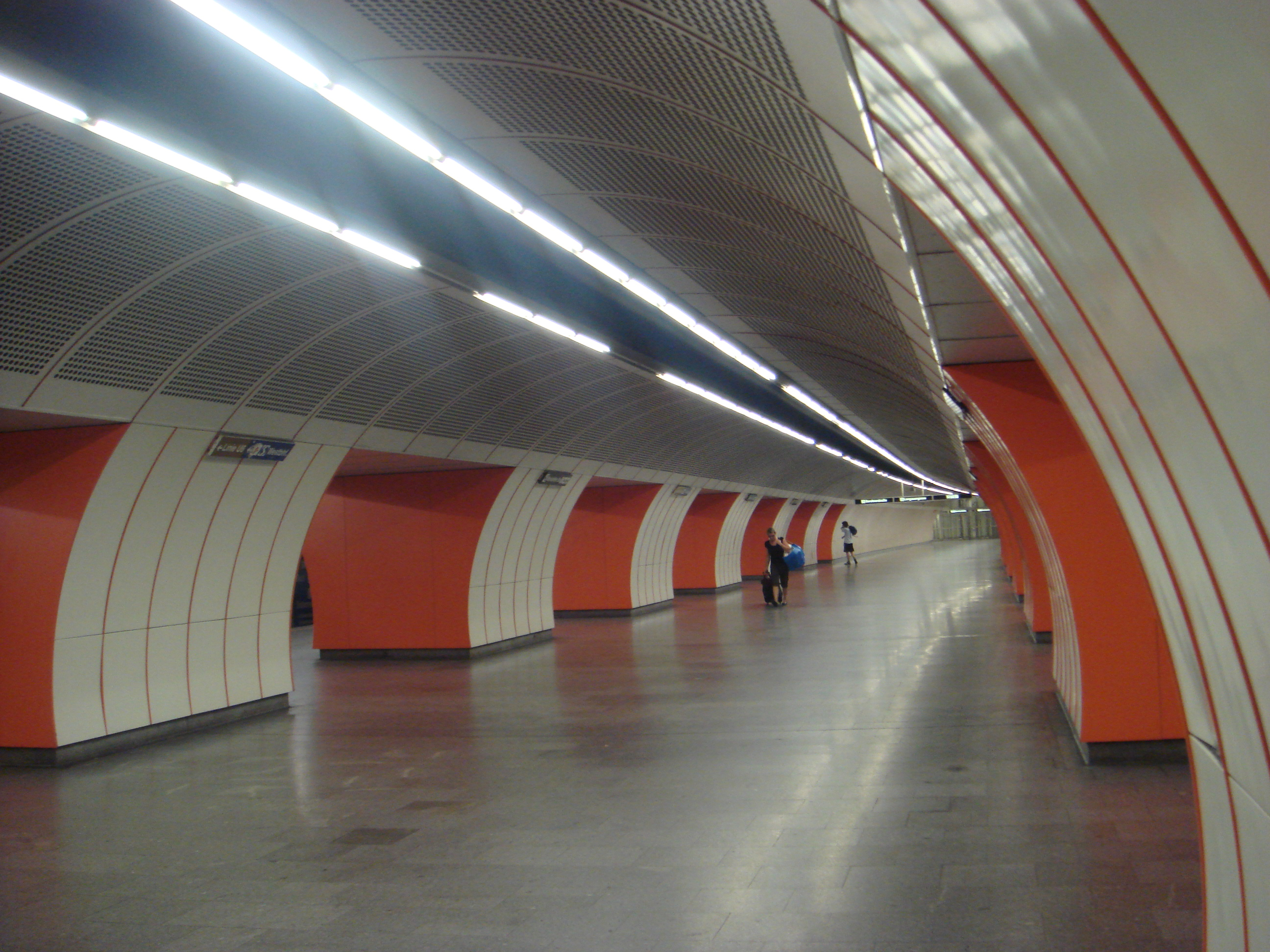
The U3 underground station

In the course of building the U3 subway line, a large new steel and glass construction was built in 1993, which accommodates some of the station's restaurants and a cafe on several levels. The underground passage to the subway stations can be reached from the lower level.

Various businesses catering to travellers are on both levels of the hall (supermarket, tobacco and newsstands, Internet cafe, post office, copy centre, snack shops, flower shops, barber shop, etc.). The police station was officially closed on April 26, 2006, because further use was not considered reasonable following a vermin infestation.

=== 2008–2011 ===
In mid-September 2008 a series of works commenced at Wien West, including the renovation of the listed ticket hall, the removal of the expensive, redundant flag poles outside of the station (which were placed too closely next to one another to ever carry flags), and the construction of new buildings to the left and right of the main hall, all of which are part of the new BahnhofCity project. To the left, above the park on the corner of Mariahilfer Straße and Neubaugürtel, an office building with a large atrium, on the other side another modern office complex with integrated hotel was constructed. The new shopping centre includes space for roughly 90 shops and various restaurants.

During the construction period the entire ticket hall and the Europaplatz in front of it were shut down. A provisional station building was created south of the main hall so that the station could remain in operation.

Building and refurbishing works cost roughly 200 million Euros and were finished in 2011. The station and the buildings of BahnhofCity Wien West were officially reopened on 23 November 2011.

=== 2015 to present ===
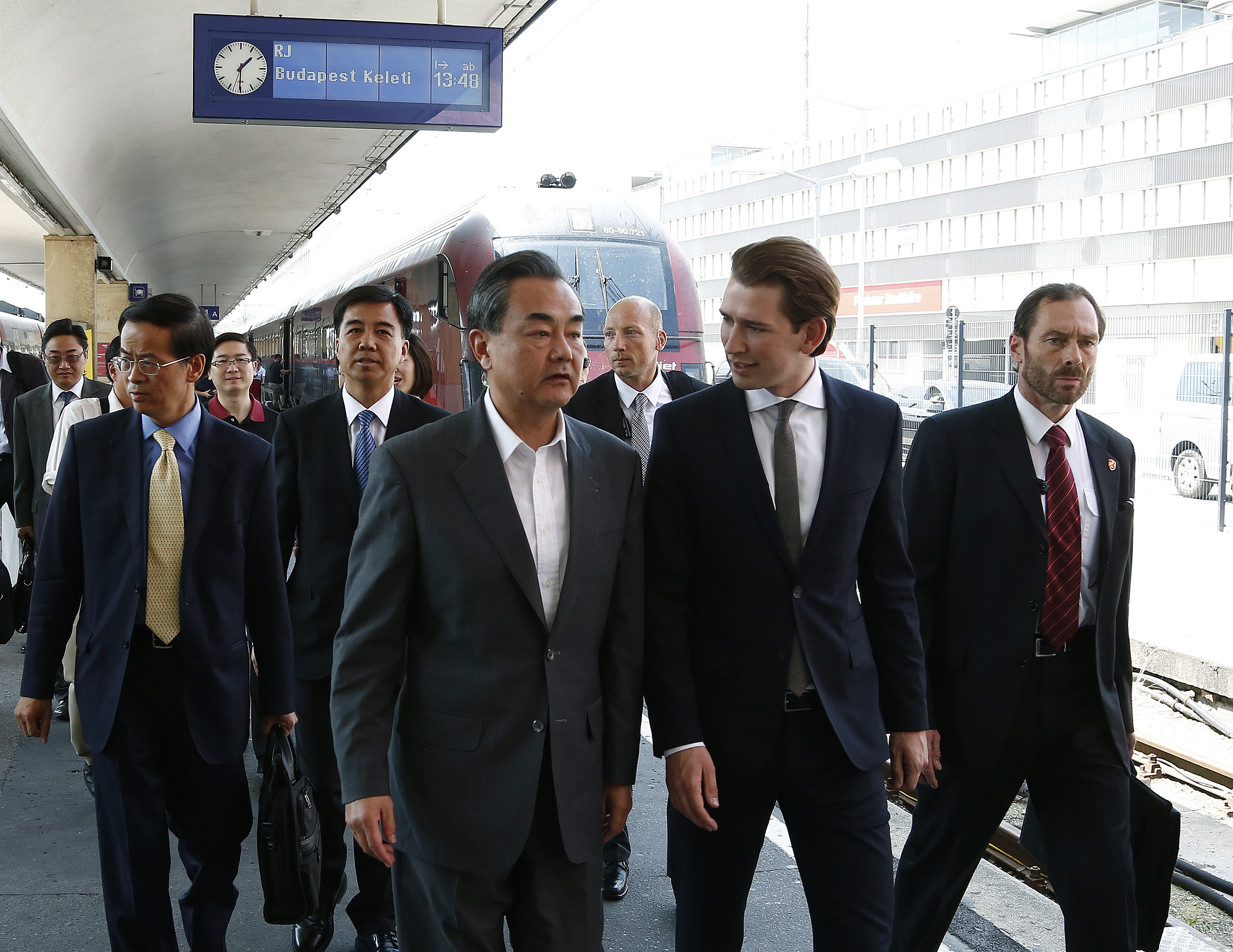
Austrian Foreign Minister Sebastian Kurz welcomes the Chinese Foreign Minister Wang Yi at Westbahnhof, July 2015.

With the timetable change in December 2015, all ÖBB long-distance services were re-routed through the purpose-built Lainzer Tunnel to Wien Meidling and Wien Hauptbahnhof stations, bypassing Westbahnhof. This not only simplified rail operations for the federal railways, as trains had to be reversed in Westbahnhof for through services, but also made interconnection between international, national and regional rail services faster and more efficient due to the replacement of several termini distributed across the city with one through station. This change, a significant part of Austria's contribution to the Magistrale for Europe, was a significant downgrade of the role of Westbahnhof.

In 2021, IKEA opened an eco-friendly store (IKEA Einrichtungshaus Wien Westbahnhof) beside the station building. This store, unlike traditional IKEA stores, does not feature parking facilities and only sells products that can be carried home by public transport. Large furniture can however be ordered at the store and delivered with zero-emission vehicles.

== Train services ==
The station sees trains on the following routes:

- Intercity services to St. Pölten, Linz, Wels, Salzburg (continuing to Munich or Bregenz)
- Regional services to St. Pölten, Amstetten, and St. Valentin
- Vienna S-Bahn service to Neulengbach

== In popular culture ==
The station serves as location of the climax to the Richard Linklater film Before Sunrise.

== Commemorative coin ==
Wien Westbahnhof was selected in 2008 as a main motif for a high value collectors' coin: the Empress Elisabeth Western Railway commemorative coin. The reverse shows a view of the passenger hall of the first Vienna West Railway Station. The style of this building was inspired by Romantic Historism. On the right of the coin, the statue of the Empress Elisabeth can be seen. This statue stands today in the upper hall of the station.

== Notable people who worked at the Westbahnhof ==
- Franz Rauscher

== See also ==
- Rail transport in Austria
- Wien Hauptbahnhof
- Wien Südbahnhof

== Bibliography ==
- Kaiser, Wolfgang (2011). Die Wiener Bahnhöfe. Geschichte, Gegenwart und Zukunft [Vienna's Railway Stations: Past, Present and Future] (in German). München: GeraMond. ISBN 9783862451104. OCLC 724801367.
