= Siemens Vectouro =

European passenger coach

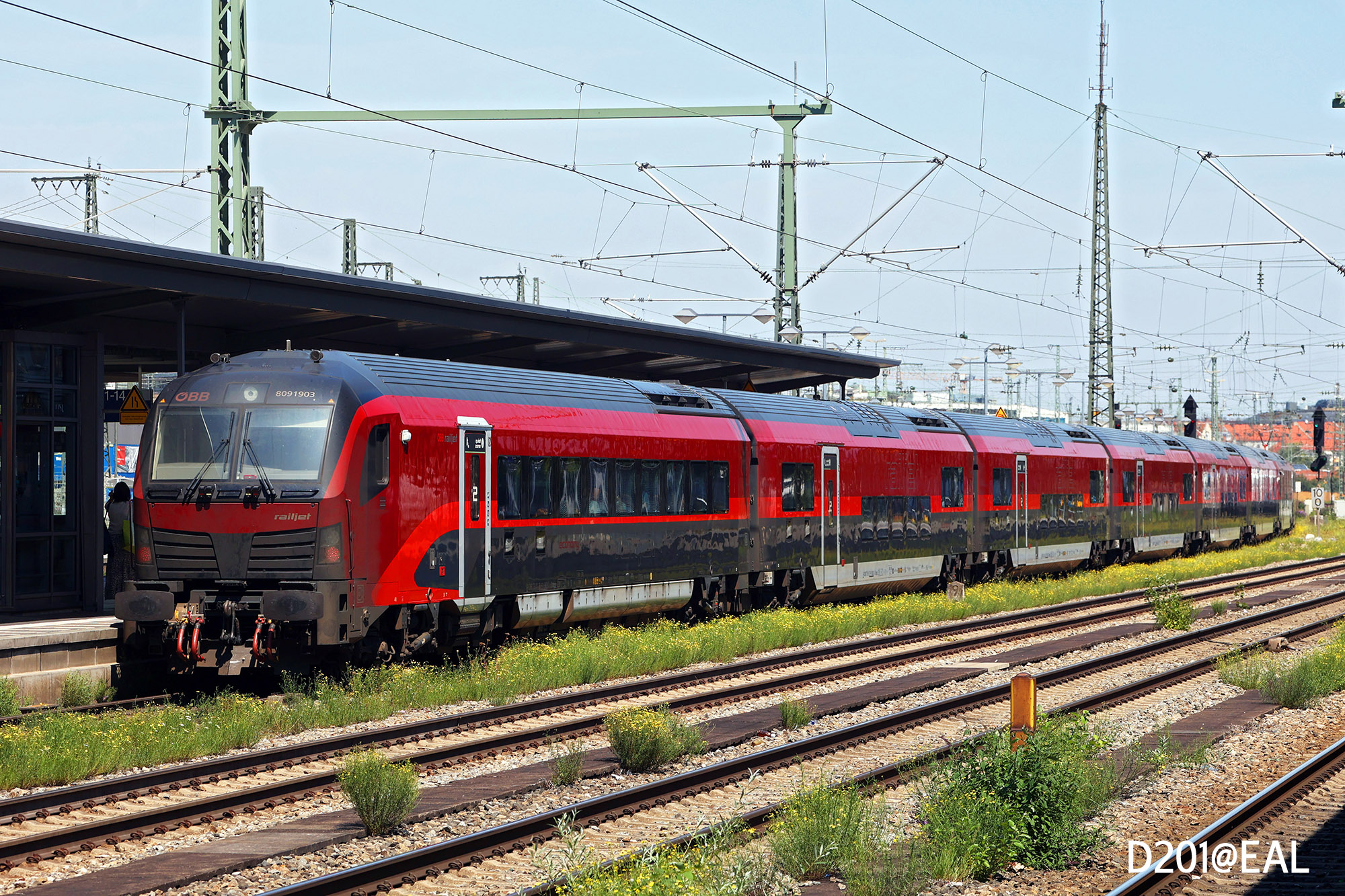
- Vectouro NMU in Railjet livery at Munich East station in 2025.
- Stock type: Locomotive-hauled trainset
- Manufacturer: Siemens Mobility
- Built at: Siemens Mobility Graz
- Constructed: 2006–present
- Entered service: 2008
- Number built: 156 sets
- Predecessor: Siemens(SGP) Modularwagen

Specifications
- Car length: Middle-car; 26.50 metres (86.9 ft); End-car; 26.45 metres (86.8 ft)
- Maximum speed: 230 kilometres per hour (140 mph), 220 kilometres per hour (140 mph) (Germany)
- Current collection: Head-end power (HEP)
- Bogies: Siemens SF400
- Minimum turning radius: 150 metres (490 ft)
- Coupling system: Buffers and chain coupler
- Track gauge: 1,435 mm (4 ft 8 1/2 in)

The Siemens Vectouro (previously Viaggio Comfort and Viaggio Next Level) are a family of passenger trains built by Siemens Mobility starting from 2023. The train sets run as fixed configurations of either day or night carriages at up to 230 kilometres per hour (140 mph) and are hauled by a separate locomotive.

== History ==
On 12 April 2021, the Siemens Mobility – Škoda Transportation consortium won the competition for the framework contract for the supply of 180 new express wagons for České dráhy. 20 sets consist of 9 Siemens Viaggio Comfort wagons.

In July, Austrian Federal Railways (ÖBB) announced Siemens Mobility as the bid winner for a contract of 21 day-and-night long-distance train sets for round 375 million Euros.

On 10 December 2023, the last night of the 2023 timetable, a Viaggio Next Level set started its operation on the ÖBB's Nightjet network as NJ 40420/40491 Innsbruck - Hamburg and NJ 490/491 Vienna – Hamburg services. They are hauled by ÖBB Taurus locomotives instead of Siemens Vectrons which they are originally designed for, that because the Vectrons that were then delivered to ÖBB (Class 1293) are freight variants and were not yet certified for passenger services and had a maximum speed of only 160km/h.

In March 2024, the first authorised 9-car set started running domestically in Austria as part of the testing procedures before entering service.

On 5 April 2024, the first ÖBB Railjet NG was run between Munich Central Station and Verona Porta Nuova as a special journey to present the new train to the officials and media.

On 8 April 2024, the Railjet NG entered regular service between Germany and Italy as RJ 87 from Munich central station to Bologna central station.

== Variants ==
=== ÖBB Railjet (2008) ===
Railjet
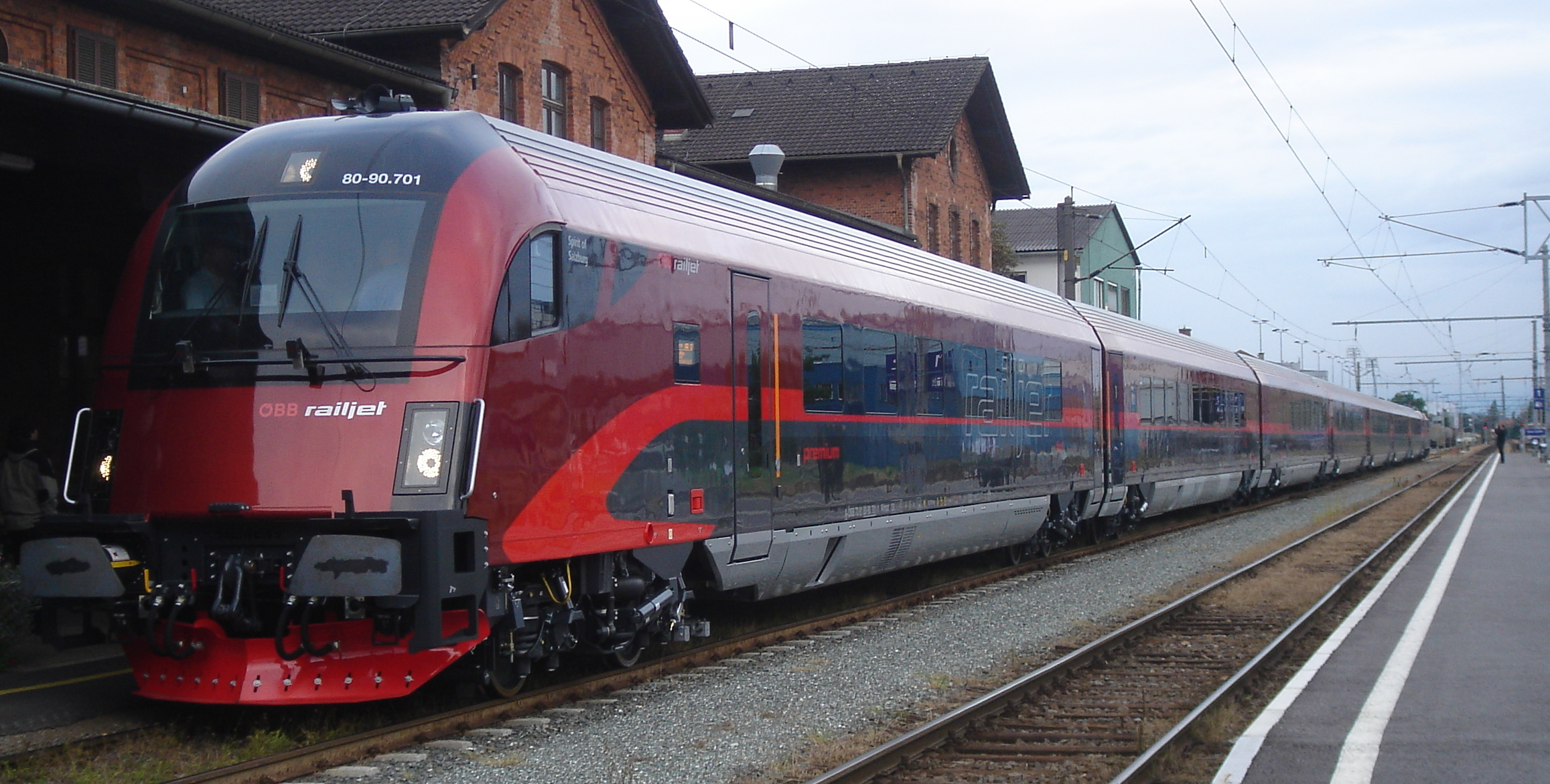
- RJ-001 “Spirit of Salzburg”
- Stock type: Locomotive-hauled trainset
- Manufacturer: Siemens Mobility
- Designer: (Austria) Moodley Strategy & Design Group
- Family name: Siemens Viaggio Comfort
- Constructed: 2006–2016
- Entered service: 2008
- Refurbished: 2025–present
- Number built: 60
- Formation: 7-car set
- Fleet numbers: RJ 001-060
- Operator: Österreichische Bundesbahnen

Specifications
- Train length: 7-car set (without locomotive); 185.8 metres (610 ft)
- UIC classification: (2’2’)(2’2’)(2’2’)(2’2’)(2’2’)(2’2’)(2’2’)
- Safety systems: ERTMS: ETCS Baseline 3 Release 2; GSM-R Baseline 1; NTC: LZB (Germany / Austria); PZB 90 (Germany / Austria); Mirel VZ1 (HU/CZ/SLO) (01-23, 29-31); Sifa

The Austrian Federal Railways (ÖBB) Railjet is a single-level passenger coach designed for long-distance intercity passenger service. Initially marketed by its manufacturer Siemens Mobility as Viaggio Comfort non-traction trainset.

A typical set of Railjet NMU includes 7 coaches and a locomotive (currently Siemens EuroSprinter ES64U2, EuroSprinter ES64U4 and Vectron) for push and pull operations.

The first batch (RJ 001–023) are configured for operations in Switzerland and Hungary, therefore are only coupled with similarly configured ES64U2 “Taurus 2” locomotives (1116 201–223) and are equipped with Mirel VZ1, ZUB and Intregra-Signum signaling systems for operations in these two countries.

Three (RJ 029–031) of the 37 sets from the second batch of train sets are also equipped with Mirel VZ1 to extend the operation into the Czech Republic. Together with the 7 other Railjet sets from České dráhy (ČD), they form a cooperated operation on the Prague-Vienna-Graz line.

Coach sequence of Railjet 001-051
| Type | Number | Model | UIC number | Class | Length |
|---|---|---|---|---|---|
| Control car | 27 | Afmpz | A-ÖBB 73 81 80-90 7xx-x | Business/First | 26.85m |
| Middle car | 26 | Ampz | A-ÖBB 73 81 19-90 6xx-x | First | 26.50m |
| Middle car | 25 | ARbmpz | A-ÖBB 73 81 85-90 5xx-x | First | 26.50m |
| Middle car | 24 | Bmpz | A-ÖBB 73 81 22-90 4xx-x | Economy | 26.50m |
| Middle car | 23 | Bmpz | A-ÖBB 73 81 22-90 3xx-x | Economy | 26.50m |
| Middle car | 22 | Bmpz | A-ÖBB 73 81 22-90 2xx-x | Economy | 26.50m |
| End car | 21 | Bmpvz | A-ÖBB 73 81 84-90 1xx-x | Economy | 26.45m |
| Locomotive | | 1116/1216 | A-ÖBB 91 81 1x16 xxx-x | Engine | |

Coach sequence of Railjet 052-060
| Type | Number | Model | UIC number | Class | Length |
|---|---|---|---|---|---|
| Control car | 27 | Afmpz | A-ÖBB 73 81 80-90 7xx-x | Business/First | 26.85m |
| Middle car | 26 | ARbmpz | A-ÖBB 73 81 85-90 6xx-x | First | 26.50m |
| Middle car | 25 | Bmpz | A-ÖBB 73 81 22-90 5xx-x | Economy | 26.50m |
| Middle car | 24 | Bmpz | A-ÖBB 73 81 22-90 4xx-x | Economy | 26.50m |
| Middle car | 23 | Bmpz | A-ÖBB 73 81 22-90 3xx-x | Economy | 26.50m |
| Middle car | 22 | Bmpz | A-ÖBB 73 81 22-90 2xx-x | Economy | 26.50m |
| End car | 21 | Bmpvz | A-ÖBB 73 81 84-90 1xx-x | Economy | 26.45m |
| Locomotive | | 1116/1216 | A-ÖBB 91 81 1x16 xxx-x | Engine | |

=== ČD Railjet (2014) ===
ČD Railjet
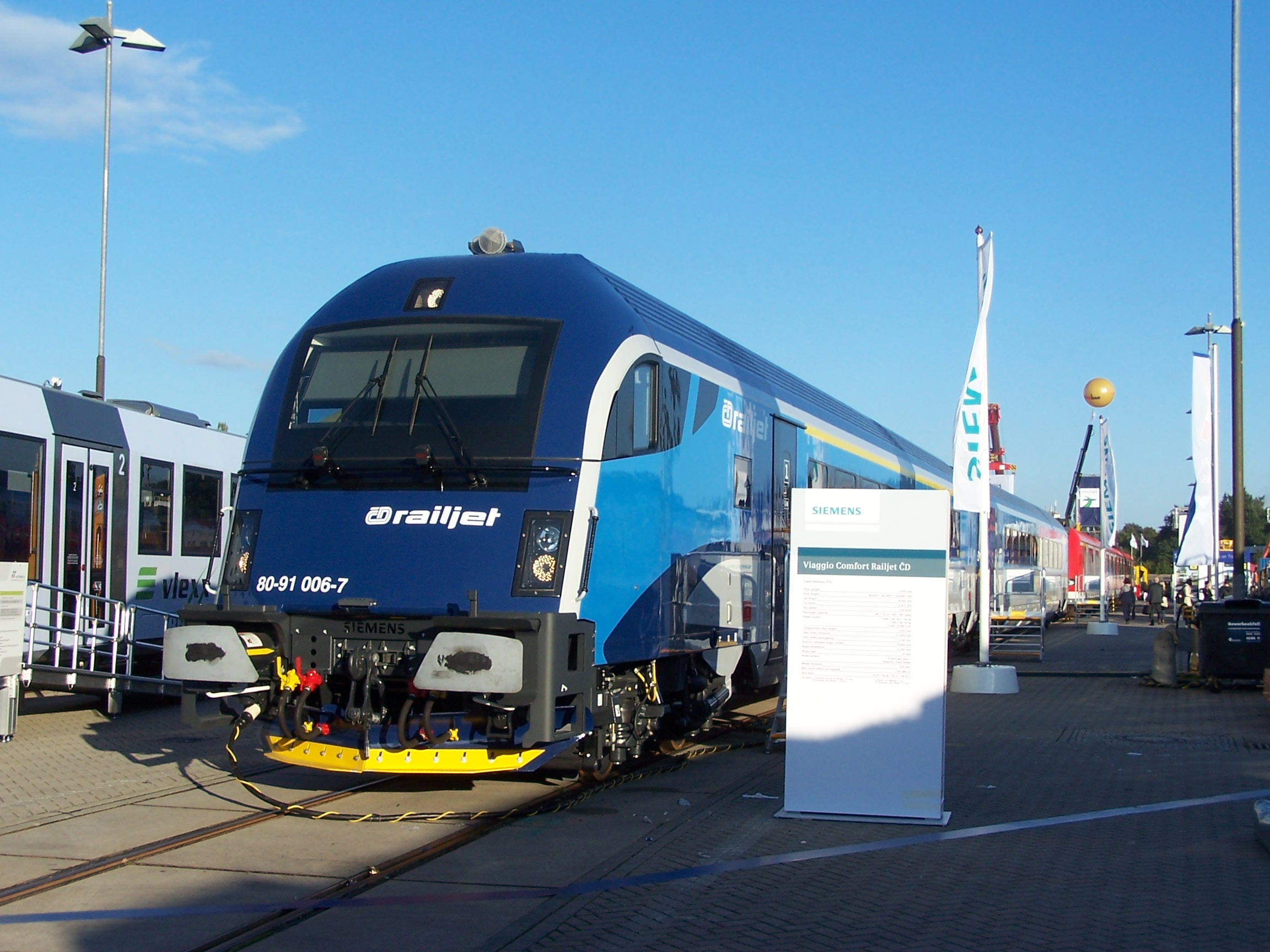
- ČD RJ-006 at InnoTrans 2014
- Stock type: Locomotive-hauled trainset
- Family name: Siemens Viaggio Comfort
- Constructed: 2013–2014
- Entered service: 2014
- Number built: 7
- Formation: 7-car set
- Fleet numbers: ČD RJ 001–007
- Operator: České dráhy

Specifications
- Train length: 7-car set (without locomotive); 185.8 metres (610 ft)
- UIC classification: (2’2’)(2’2’)(2’2’)(2’2’)(2’2’)(2’2’)(2’2’)
- Safety systems: ERTMS: ETCS Baseline 3 Release 2; GSM-R Baseline 1; NTC: LZB (Germany / Austria); PZB 90 (Germany / Austria); Mirel VZ1 (HU/CZ/SLO); Sifa

The České dráhy (ČD) Railjet is a high-speed locomotive-hauled trainset built by Siemens Mobility. It is similar the Austrian Federal Railways’ (ÖBB) first generation railjet coaches but with a different cabin layout and livery.

The first commercial service was commenced in December 2014 with a joint operation with ÖBB on the Prague-Vienna-Graz line with České dráhy investing seven sets (ČD RJ 001–007) and ÖBB investing three sets (ÖBB RJ 029–031).

The coaches are owned by ČD, but the EuroSprinter locomotives for traction are leased from the Austrian Federal Railways (ÖBB) that are painted in ČD Railjet colors.

| Type | Number | Model | UIC number | Class | Length |
|---|---|---|---|---|---|
| Control car | 27 | Afmpz | CZ-ČD 73 54 80-91 7xx-x | Business/First | 26.85m |
| Middle car | 26 | ARbmpz | CZ-ČD 73 54 85-91 6xx-x | First | 26.50m |
| Middle car | 25 | Bmpz | CZ-ČD 73 54 22-91 5xx-x | Economy | 26.50m |
| Middle car | 24 | Bmpz | CZ-ČD 73 54 22-91 4xx-x | Economy | 26.50m |
| Middle car | 23 | Bmpz | CZ-ČD 73 54 22-91 3xx-x | Economy | 26.50m |
| Middle car | 22 | Bmpz | CZ-ČD 73 54 22-91 2xx-x | Economy | 26.50m |
| End car | 21 | Bmpz | CZ-ČD 73 54 84-91 1xx-x | Economy | 26.45m |
| Locomotive | | 1216 | A-ÖBB 91 81 1216 xxx-x | Engine | |

=== ČD InterJet (2021) ===
InterJet
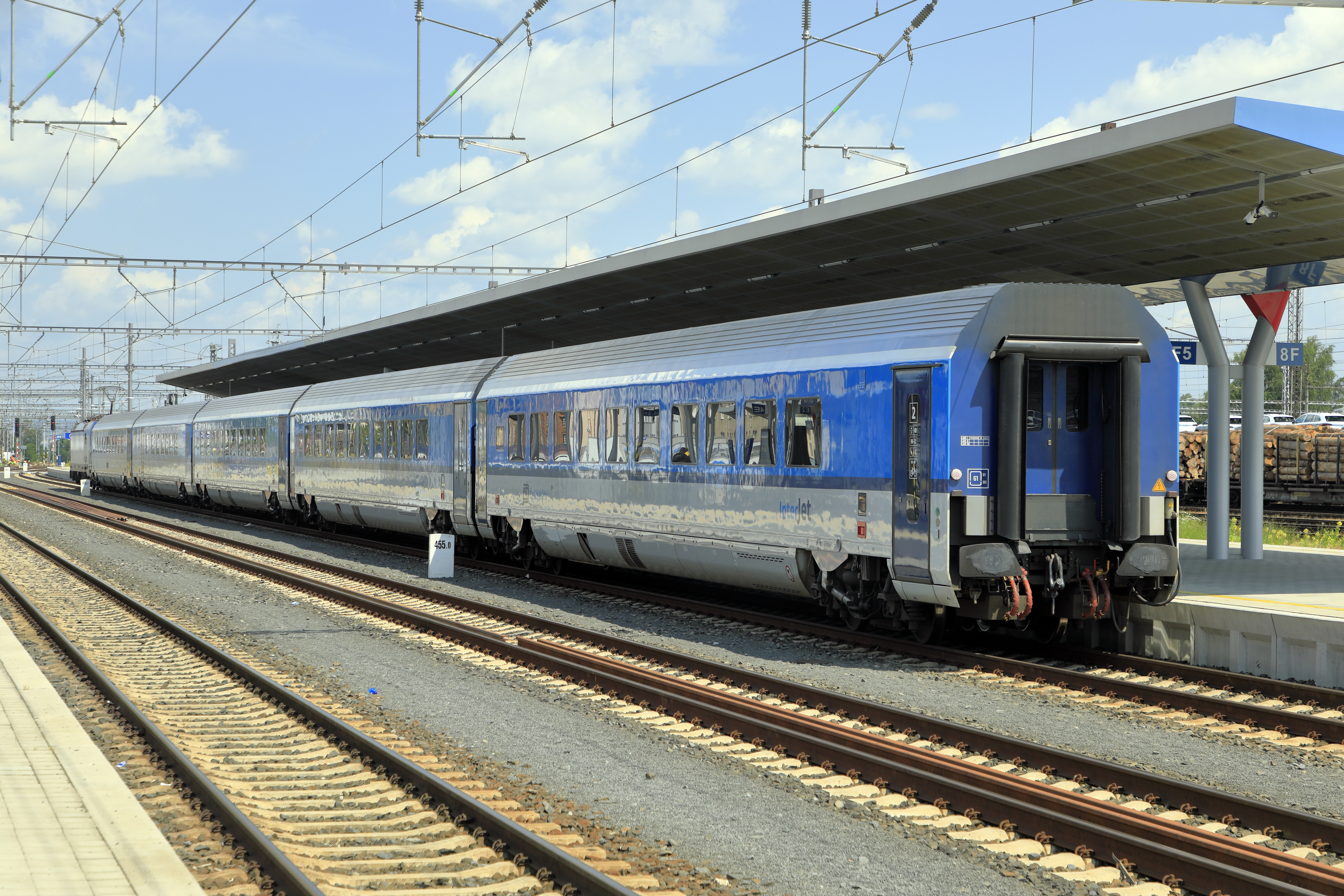
- InterJet set at Eger station
- Stock type: Locomotive-hauled trainset
- Family name: Siemens Vectouro
- Entered service: 2021
- Formation: 5-car set
- Operator: České dráhy

Specifications
- Train length: Without locomotive; 132.4 metres (434 ft)
- Maximum speed: 200 kilometres per hour (120 mph)
- UIC classification: (2’2’)(2’2’)(2’2’)(2’2’)(2’2’)

The České dráhy (ČD) Interjet is a high-speed locomotive-hauled trainset built by Siemens Mobility. It is based on the Austrian Federal Railways’ (ÖBB) first generation railjet coaches, albelt in 5 carriages and do not feature a control cab car in the fixed formation. The top operating speed was also reduced to 200km/h.

With both UIC-standard chains and buffer connections on both ends, it is capable of being used with other separate UIC carriages or NMUs to be formed to a longer train set.

It entered commercial service on 12 December, 2021.

| Type | Number | Model | UIC number | Class | |
|---|---|---|---|---|---|
| End car | 2 | Ampz 894 | CZ-ČD 73 54 10-91 03x-x | First class | 26.45m |
| Middle car | 4 | Bbmpz 897 | CZ-ČD 73 54 84-91 01x-x | Second Class | 26.50m |
| Middle car | 5 | Bmpz 895 | CZ-ČD 73 54 21-91 06x-x | Second Class | 26.50m |
| Middle car | 6 | Bmpz 895 | CZ-ČD 73 54 21-91 07x-x | Second Class | 26.50m |
| End car | 7 | Bdmpz 896 | CZ-ČD 73 54 21-91 08x-x | Second Class | 26.45m |

=== ÖBB Nightjet New Generation (2023) ===
Nightjet New Generation
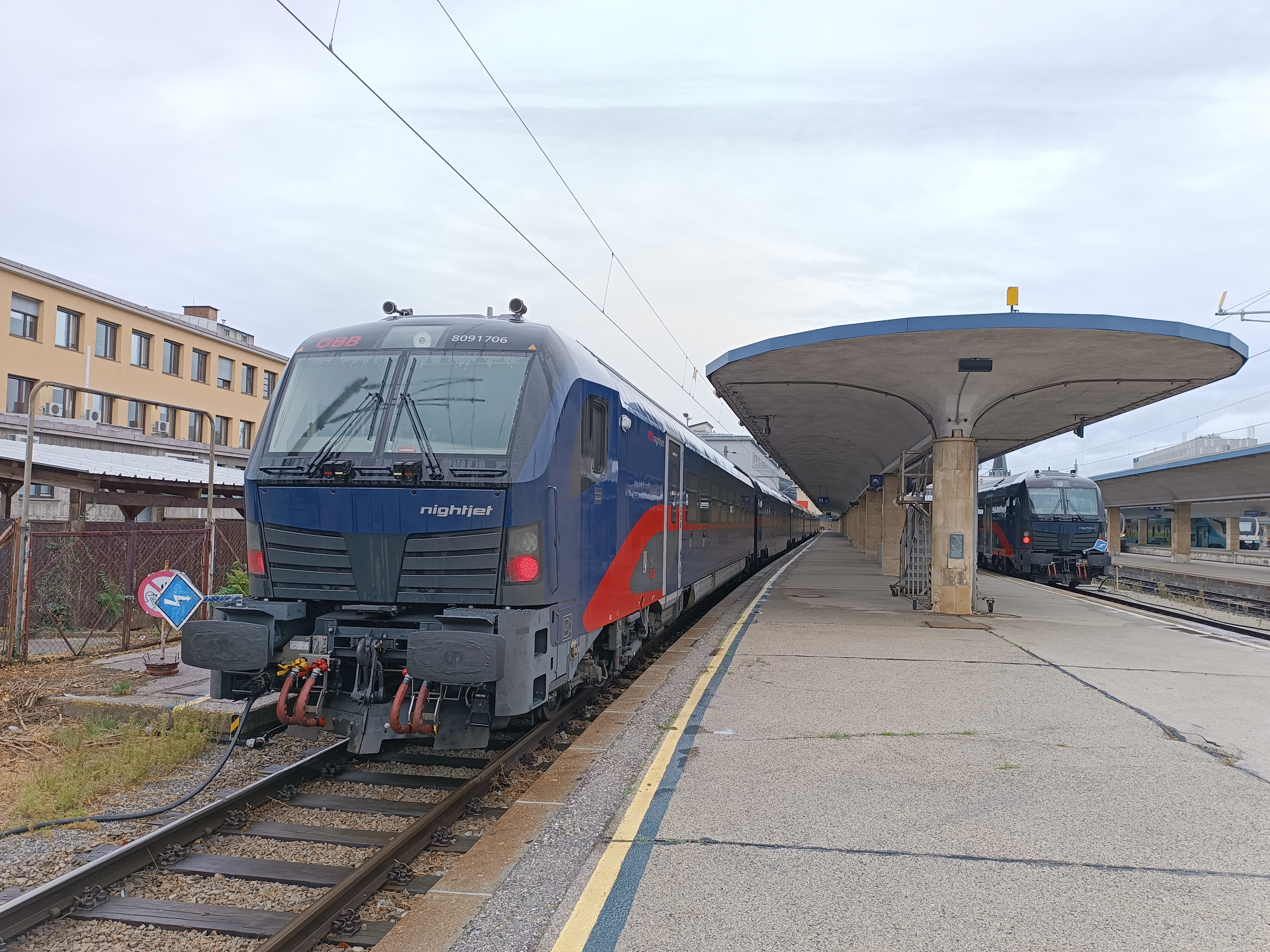
- NJ NG 006 and NJ NG 013 at Vienna West station
- Stock type: Locomotive-hauled trainset
- Manufacturer: Siemens Mobility
- Family name: Siemens Viaggio Next Level
- Constructed: 2022–present
- Entered service: 2023
- Number under construction: 24
- Predecessor: City Night Line ComfortLine
- Formation: 7-car set
- Fleet numbers: NJ NG 001–025
- Operator: Österreichische Bundesbahnen

Specifications
- Train length: Without locomotive; 185.75 metres (609.4 ft)
- Maximum speed: 230 km/h (140 mph)
- Current collection: head-end power
- UIC classification: (2’2’)(2’2’)(2’2’)(2’2’)(2’2’)(2’2’)(2’2’)
- Safety systems: ERTMS: ETCS Baseline 3 Release 2 (Siemens Trainguard 200); GSM-R Baseline 1 (funkwerk MESA 26 BASE 02.0x); NTC: ATB (Netherlands); SCMT (Italy); LZB CE I (Germany & Austria); PZB 90 (Germany & Austria); Sifa
- Coupling system: buffer and chain coupler
- Track gauge: 1,435 mm (4 ft 8 1/2 in)

The Austrian Federal Railways (ÖBB) Nightjet New Generation (NJ NG) is a single-level passenger coach designed for long-distance overnight passenger service. Initially marketed by its manufacturer Siemens Mobility as Viaggio Next Level non-traction unit, they are similar to other locomotive-hauled Railjet trains, but include sleeping car and couchette carriages for sleeping.

A typical set of NJ NG includes 7 coaches and a locomotive (currently Siemens EuroSprinter ES64U2, EuroSprinter ES64U4 and Vectron) for push and pull operations. One control car at the front of the set which also functions as a seating car, a Vectron-style cab is also installed for push-operations. Thereafter comes another seating car with low-floor entries, three couchettes and two sleeping cars.

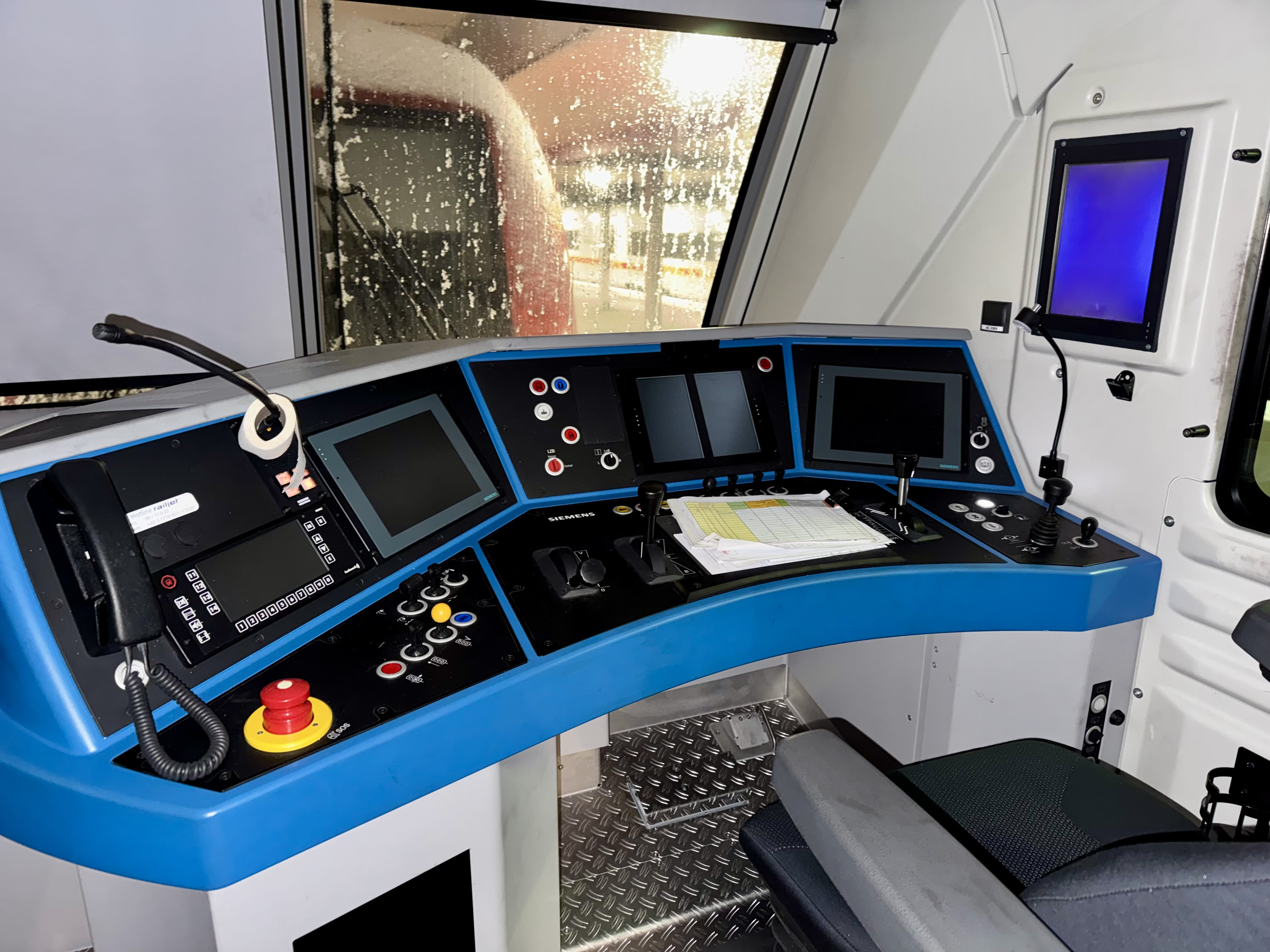
The remote cab of the Nightjet New Generation, with a similar layout of the Vectron locomotive. Equipped with Siemens Trainguard 200 ETCS OBU.

On 27 November 2025, after two years into service, the European Union Agency for Railways (ERA) granted certification for the control car (Bfmpz) of the Nightjet New Generation NMU to use the remote cab for push-and-pull operations in Germany and Austria. However Italy and the Netherlands are still pending.

==== Design ====
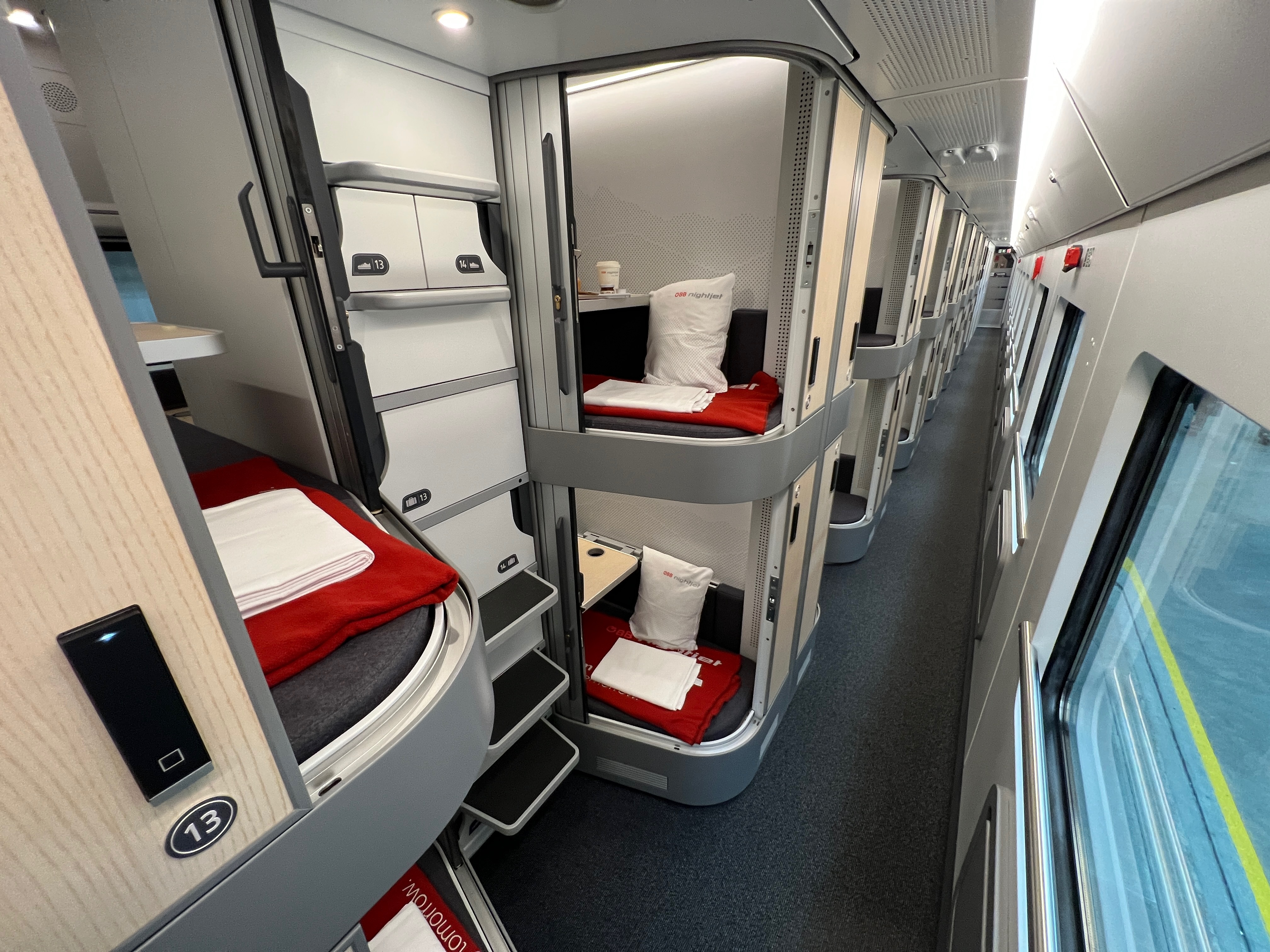
Interior of mini-suite capsule/couchette car accommodation

The planned interior design of the night trains was demonstrated by Siemens and ÖBB during September 2022. All sleeping car compartments feature an en-suite wet room with combined shower and toilet. One "Comfort Plus" sleeping car compartment per carriage has an en-suite bathroom with en-suite toilet and separate shower.

Shared couchette accommodation is provided either as fixed four-bed compartments, or as mini-suite capsules similar to capsule hotel accommodation. Carriages are fitted with a fire sprinkler system.

To simplify reversing and shunting operations the first seating carriage is a control car. At the opposite end of the train, the last sleeping carriage has a standard gangway connection for coupling to older rolling stock.

Nightjet 2.0 trains were designed for operation up to 250 km/h (160 mph), but are limited to 230 km/h (140 mph) in use. Two train sets coupled together fit into the standard 400 m (1,300 ft) maximum railway platform length for passenger trains in Europe. A single trainset can carry up to 254 passengers, and a double-set up to 508 passengers.

==== Orders ====
In August 2021, the order was increased from 13 new Nightjet trains to 33 trains. In July 2025, the production ratio between Siemens Viaggio Next Level Railjets and Nightjets was adjusted, with the number of Nightjet trains reduced to 24, and Railjets increased to 40 sets (28 with seven carriages, and 12 with nine carriages).

==== Services ====
The Vienna/Innsbruck–Hamburg-Altona station night train received the first Nightjet 2.0 trains on 10 December 2023. Services from Vienna–Bregenz have used the stock since March 2024, with Vienna–Rome being added in September 2024. The stock was first used on the Vienna/Innsbruck–Amsterdam Centraal station service in May 2025.

Coach sequence of Nightjet new generation
| Type | Number | Model | UIC number | Class | Length |
|---|---|---|---|---|---|
| Control car | 417 | Bfmpz | A-ÖBB 73 81 80-91 7xx-x | Seat car | 26.80m |
| Middle car | 416 | ABbmpvz | A-ÖBB 73 81 38-91 6xx-x | Seat car | 26.50m |
| Middle car | 415 | Bcmz | A-ÖBB 73 81 52-91 5xx-x | Couchette | 26.50m |
| Middle car | 414 | Bcmz | A-ÖBB 73 81 52-91 4xx-x | Couchette | 26.50m |
| Middle car | 413 | Bcmz | A-ÖBB 73 81 52-91 3xx-x | Couchette | 26.50m |
| Middle car | 412 | WLAmz | A-ÖBB 73 81 70-91 2xx-x | Sleeping car | 26.50m |
| End car | 411 | WLAmz | A-ÖBB 73 81 70-91 1xx-x | Sleeping car | 26.45m |
| Locomotive | | 1116/1216 | A-ÖBB 91 81 1x16 xxx-x | Engine | |

=== ÖBB Railjet New Generation (2024) ===
Railjet New Generation
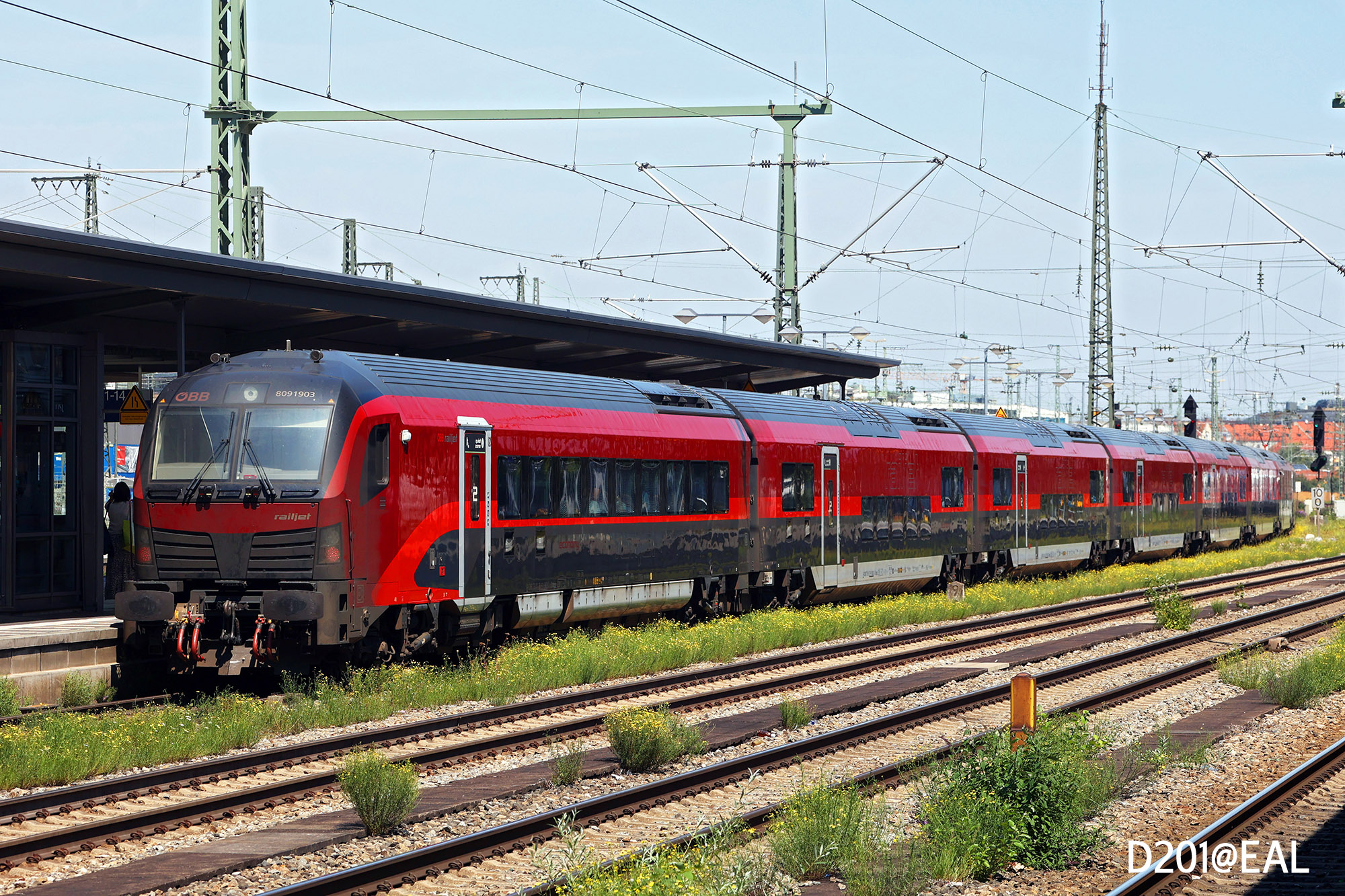
- RJ NG-003 at Munich East station in 2025
- Stock type: Locomotive-hauled trainset
- Family name: Siemens Viaggio Next Level
- Entered service: 2024
- Formation: 7-car set; 9-car set
- Fleet numbers: 9-car: 1. Batch 001-008; 2. Batch 009-012
- Operator: Österreichische Bundesbahnen

Specifications
- Train length: 9-car set (without locomotive); 238.75 metres (783.3 ft); 7-car set (without locomotive); 185.75 metres (609.4 ft)
- UIC classification: 7-car: 2’2’+2’2’+2’2’+2’2’+2’2’+2’2’+2’2’; 9-car: 2’2’+2’2’+2’2’+2’2’+2’2’+2’2’+2’2’+2’2’+2’2’
- Safety systems: ERTMS: ETCS Baseline 3 Release 2 (Siemens Trainguard 200); GSM-R Baseline 1 (funkwerk MESA 26 BASE 02.0x); NTC: SCMT (Italy); LZB CE I (Germany & Austria); PZB 90 (Germany & Austria); Sifa

The Austrian Federal Railways (ÖBB) Railjet New Generation (RJ NG) is a single-level passenger coach designed for long-distance intercity passenger service. Initially marketed by its manufacturer Siemens Mobility as a Viaggio Next Level non-traction trainset.

A typical Railjet New Generation trainset includes 9 coaches and a locomotive (currently Siemens EuroSprinter ES64U2, EuroSprinter ES64U4 and Vectron) for push-pull operations.

It is designed to replace the old fleet of Railjet first generation coaches and InterCity coach pool which are now the work horses of Austrian intercity rail network.

On 27 November 2025, after a year into service, the European Union Agency for Railways (ERA) has granted the certification for the control car (Bfmpz) of the Nightjet New Generation to use the remote cab for push-and-pull operations in Germany and Austria. However Italy is still pending, therefore cross-border services remains current locomotive-hauled configuration.

Coach sequence of Railjet new generation
| Type | Number | Model | UIC number | Class | Length |
|---|---|---|---|---|---|
| Control car | 269 | Bfmpz | A-ÖBB 73 81 80-91 9xx-x | Economy | 26.80m |
| Middle car | 268 | Bbmpvz | A-ÖBB 73 81 22-91 8xx-x | Economy | 26.50m |
| Middle car | 267 | Bbmpvz | A-ÖBB 73 81 22-91 7xx-x | Economy | 26.50m |
| Middle car | 266 | Bbmpvz | A-ÖBB 73 81 22-91 6xx-x | Economy | 26.50m |
| Middle car | 265 | Bbmpvz | A-ÖBB 73 81 22-91 5xx-x | Economy | 26.50m |
| Middle car | 264 | Bbmpvz | A-ÖBB 73 81 28-91 4xx-x | Economy | 26.50m |
| Middle car | 263 | BRmpz | A-ÖBB 73 81 85-91 3xx-x | Economy | 26.50m |
| Middle car | 262 | Ampz | A-ÖBB 73 81 19-91 2xx-x | Business | 26.50m |
| End car | 261 | Ampz | A-ÖBB 73 81 19-91 1xx-x | Business | 26.45m |
| Locomotive | | 1116/1216 | A-ÖBB 91 81 1x16 xxx-x | Engine | |

=== ČD ComfortJet (2025) ===
ComfortJet
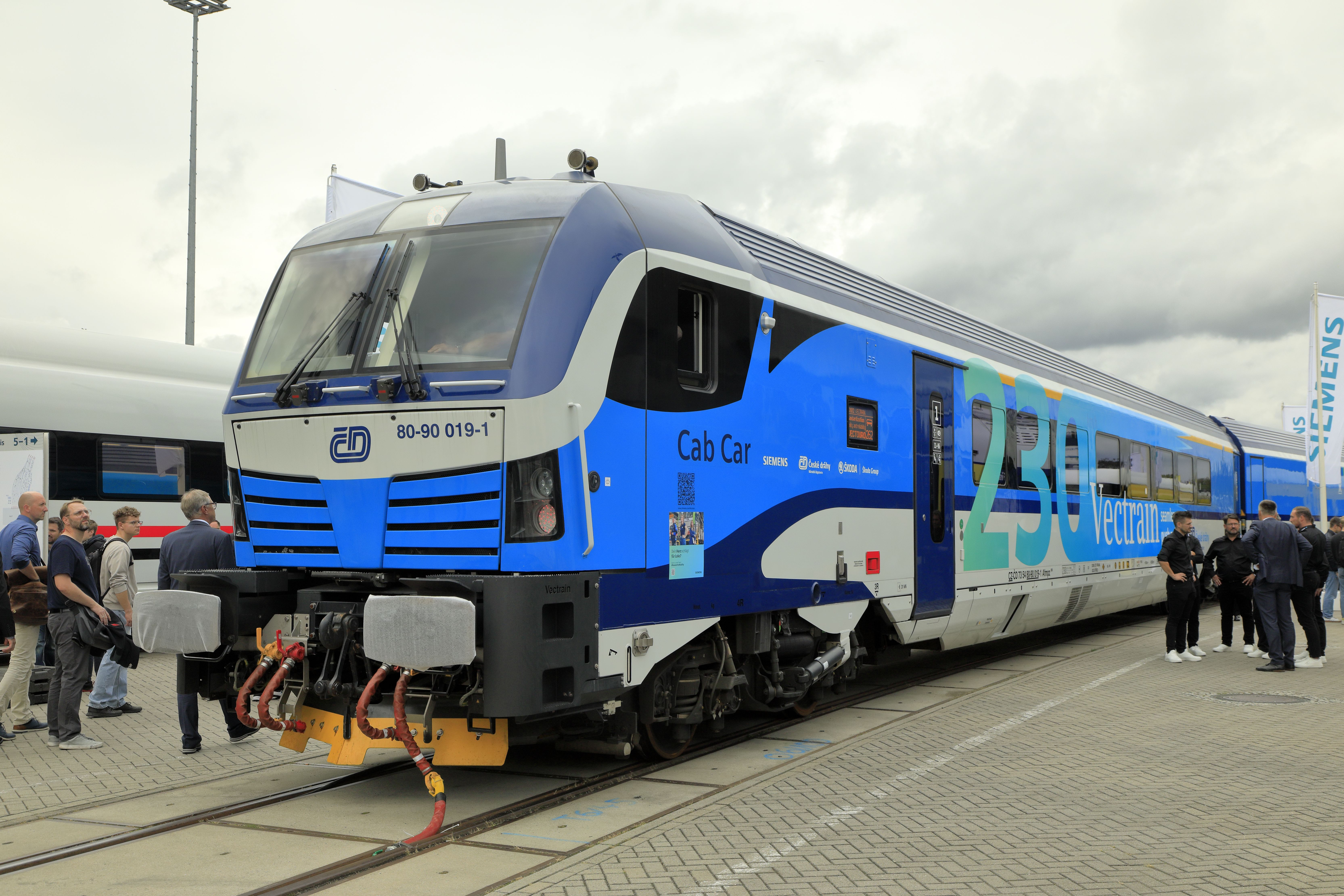
- ComfortJet at Innotrans Berlin
- Stock type: Locomotive-hauled trainset
- Family name: Siemens Vectouro
- Entered service: 2025
- Formation: 9-car set
- Operator: České dráhy

Specifications
- Train length: Without locomotive; 238.75 metres (783.3 ft)
- UIC classification: (2’2’)(2’2’)(2’2’)(2’2’)(2’2’)(2’2’)(2’2’)(2’2’)(2’2’)
- Safety systems: ERTMS: ETCS Baseline 3 Release 2; GSM-R Baseline 1; NTC: LZB (Germany & Austria); PZB 90 (Germany & Austria); Mirel VZ1 (HU/CZ/SLO); Sifa

The ComfortJet is a high-speed locomotive-hauled push-pull trainset which is being built by Siemens Mobility and Škoda Transportation for the Czech train operator České dráhy and is planned to start operations from summer 2024. Based on the Railjet, Siemens developed its Vectrain train family. It will operate at speeds of up to 230 km/h and will replace old carriages on international EuroCity services between the Czech Republic, Germany, Denmark, Austria, Slovakia and Hungary and on domestic InterCity services in the Czech Republic. It is very similar to the InterJet trains based on the same Viaggio Comfort carriages used for shorter routes, which do not feature the Afmpz control car.

In March 2022, České dráhy signed a contract with Siemens Mobility for the purchase of 50 Siemens Vectron 230 multi-system electric locomotives, which have a maximum operating speed of 230 km/h. The ComfortJet sets will be powered by these locomotives. However, this is not always the case, as for example, the R 9xx Hradečan service is pulled by a ČD Class 162 locomotive.

A ComfortJet train set consists of nine individual coaches that are permanently coupled with airtight interconnections. The coach furthest from the locomotive acts as a control car. The number of cars in the train can also be expanded by adding regular carriages, as is often done with WRmz restaurant cars.

Coach sequence of ČD ComfortJet
| Type | Number | Model | UIC number | Class | |
|---|---|---|---|---|---|
| Control car | 255 | Afmpz | CZ-ČD 73 54 80-90 0xx-x | First Class | 26.80m |
| Middle car | 256 | Ampz 881 | CZ-ČD 73 54 19-90 0xx-x | First Class | 26.50m |
| Middle car | 257 | BRmpz | CZ-ČD 73 54 85-90 0xx-x | Second Class / Dinning Car | 26.50m |
| Middle car | 258 | Bbmpz | CZ-ČD 73 54 84-90 0xx-x | Second Class | 26.50m |
| Middle car | 259 | Bmpz 885 | CZ-ČD 73 54 20-90 4xx-x | Second Class | 26.50m |
| Middle car | 260 | Bmpz | CZ-ČD 73 54 20-90 3xx-x | Second Class | 26.50m |
| Middle car | 261 | Bmpz | CZ-ČD 73 54 20-90 2xx-x | Second Class | 26.50m |
| Middle car | 262 | Bmpz | CZ-ČD 73 54 20-90 1xx-x | Second Class | 26.50m |
| End car | 263 | Bdmpz | CZ-ČD 73 54 20-90 0xx-x | Second Class | 26.45m |
| Locomotive | | 193 | 91 80 6 193 xxx-x D-RAILL | Engine | |

=== Railpool Trainpool (TBD) ===
TRAINPOOL
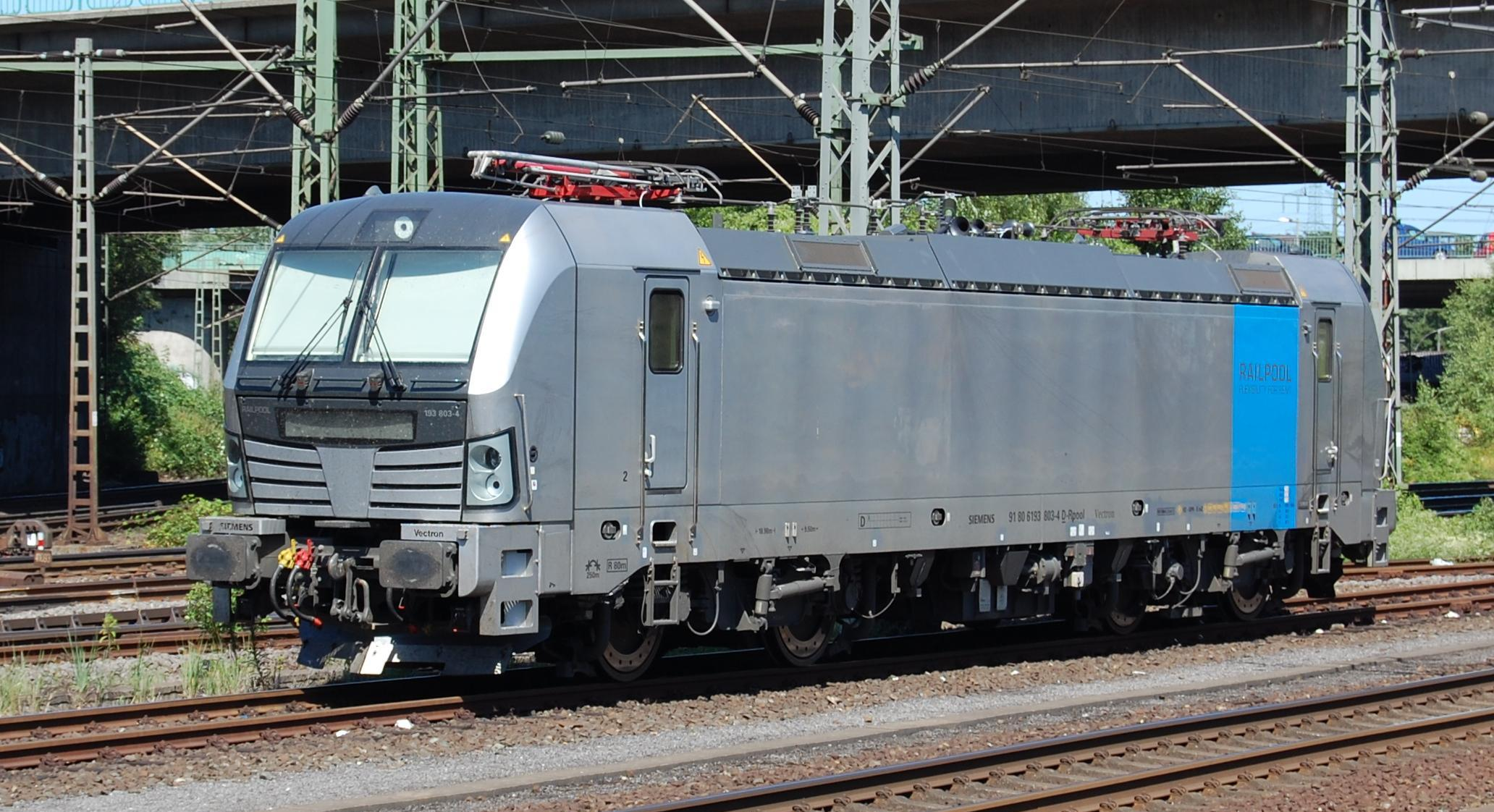
- Railpool Vectron AC locomotive
- Stock type: Locomotive-hauled trainset
- Family name: Siemens Vectrain
- Formation: 7-car set
- Operator: RAILPOOL

Specifications
- Train length: Without locomotive; 185.75 metres (609.4 ft); With locomotive; 204.73 metres (671.7 ft)
- UIC classification: (2’2’)(2’2’)(2’2’)(2’2’)(2’2’)(2’2’)(2’2’)
- Safety systems: ERTMS: ETCS Baseline 3 Release 2; GSM-R Baseline 1; NTC: LZB (Germany & Austria); PZB 90 (Germany & Austria); SHP (Poland); Mirel VZ1 (HU/CZ/SLO); Sifa

The Railpool Trainpool, stylized as RAILPOOL TRAINPOOL is a high-speed locomotive-hauled push-pull trainset which is being built by Siemens Mobility for the German train leasing company Railpool.

It is a set of Vectrain which consists of a 7-car modular Vectouro non-traction trainset coupled with a Siemens Vectron 230 multi-system locomotive, enables operations of cross-border high-speed services for up to 230km/h.

The cab cars and the locomotives are fitted with European Train Control System (ETCS) and dedicated national train control (NTC) systems for Germany, Austria, Czech Republic, Slovakia, Hungary and Poland, it also has the option to extend its capability into further countries under the existing hardware framework.

Coach sequence of RAILPOOL TRAINPOOL
| Type | Model | Length |
|---|---|---|
| Control car | Unknown | 26.80m |
| Middle car | Unknown | 26.50m |
| Middle car | Unknown | 26.50m |
| Middle car | Unknown | 26.50m |
| Middle car | Unknown | 26.50m |
| Middle car | Unknown | 26.50m |
| End car | Unknown | 26.45m |
| Locomotive | 6193/7193 | 18,98m |

== Orders ==
In July 2025 Railjet orders were increased from 27 trains to 40 trains in two different configurations. Nightjet orders were increased from 13 trains, up to 33 trains, then down again in July 2025 to 24 trainsets.

| Country | Customer | Speed | Time | Quantity | Config | Remarks | Source |
|---|---|---|---|---|---|---|---|
| Germany | RAILPOOL | 230 km/h (140 mph) | 2025 | Unknown | 7-car | Vectouro combined with Vectron 230 locomotive as Vectrain marketed as “TRAINPOOL” | |
| Austria | Austrian Federal Railways | 230 km/h (140 mph) | 2005 | 23 | 7-car | Railjet 1.0 | |
| Austria | Austrian Federal Railways | 230 km/h (140 mph) | 2007 | 44 (37 taken) | 7-car | Railjet 1.0 | |
| Austria | Austrian Federal Railways | 230 km/h (140 mph) | 2018 | 13 | 7-car | Nightjet 2.0 marketed as "Nightjet New Generation" | |
| Austria | Austrian Federal Railways | 230 km/h (140 mph) | 2025 | 20 (11 taken) | 7-car | Nightjet 2.0 marketed as "Nightjet New Generation" | |
| Austria | Austrian Federal Railways | 230 km/h (140 mph) | 2018 | 8+4 | 9-car | Railjet 2.0 marketed as "Railjet New Generation" | |
| Austria | Austrian Federal Railways | 230 km/h (140 mph) | 2025 | 28 | 7-car | Railjet 2.0 marketed as "Railjet New Generation" | |
| Czech Republic | České dráhy | 230 km/h (140 mph) | 2012 | 7 | 7-car | Railjet, transferred from ÖBB’s 2007 not-taken order. | |
| Czech Republic | České dráhy | 200 km/h (120 mph) | 2018 | 5 | 5-car | InterJet | |
| Czech Republic | České dráhy | 230 km/h (140 mph) | 2021 | 20 | 9-car | ComfortJet | |

== Services ==
Timetable Q1 2025 of Viaggio Next Level
| Service | Departure | Destination | Time | Remarks |
|---|---|---|---|---|
| RJ 82 | Bologna Centrale | München Hauptbahnhof | 6h 34m | |
| RJ 83 | München Hauptbahnhof | Bologna Centrale | 6h 35m | |
| RJ 84 | Venezia Santa Lucia | München Hauptbahnhof | 6h 53m | |
| RJ 85 | München Hauptbahnhof | Venezia Santa Lucia | 6h 53m | |
| RJ 86 | Verona Porta Nuova | München Hauptbahnhof | 5h 26m | |
| RJ 87 | München Hauptbahnhof | Bologna Centrale | 6h 43m | |
| RJ 88 | Bologna Centrale | München Hauptbahnhof | 6h 42m | |
| RJ 89 | München Hauptbahnhof | Verona Porta Nuova | 5h 26m | |
| NJ 446 | Vienna Central Station | Bregenz Station | 9h 55m | Car transport |
| NJ 447 | Bregenz Station | Vienna Central Station | 9h 24m | Car transport |
| NJ 490 | Wien Hauptbahnhof | Hamburg-Altona | 12h 56m | |
| NJ 491 | Hamburg-Altona | Wien Hauptbahnhof | 13h 21m | |
| NJ 40420 | Innsbruck Hauptbahnhof | Hamburg-Altona | 12h 20m | |
| NJ 40233 | Wien Hauptbahnhof | Roma Tiburtina | 15h 47m | |
| NJ 40294 | Roma Tiburtina | Wien Hauptbahnhof | 15h 34m | |
| NJ 40491 | Hamburg-Altona | Innsbruck Hauptbahnhof | 13h 18m | |

== See also ==
- Rail transport in Austria
- Siemens Viaggio Comfort
- Siemens Venture
