= ComfortJet =

High-speed train operated by České dráhy

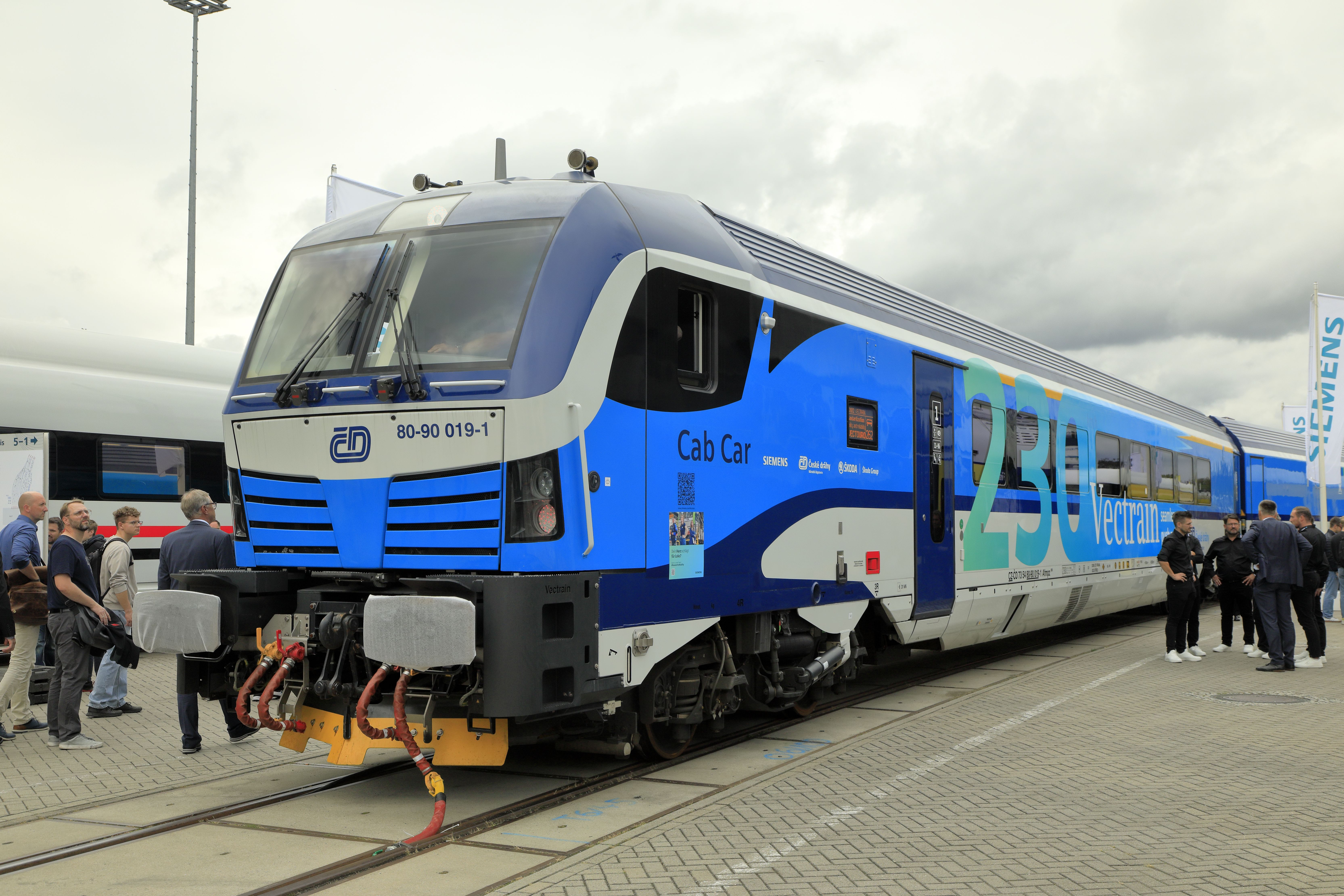
- A ČD ComfortJet at InnoTrans 2024
- Manufacturers: Siemens and Škoda Transportation
- Constructed: 2022 - present
- Formation: 1 locomotive, 9 cars
- Capacity: 555 seats
- Operator: České dráhy

Specifications
- Maximum speed: 230 km/h (140 mph)
- Traction system: Locomotive drawn (typically Vectron)
- Track gauge: 1,435 mm (4 ft 8 1/2 in) standard gauge

ComfortJet is a high-speed push-pull train which is being built by Siemens Mobility and Škoda Transportation for the Czech train operator České dráhy and began operations in summer 2024. Based on the Railjet, Siemens developed its Vectrain train family. It will operate at speeds of up to 230 km/h and will replace old carriages on international EuroCity services between the Czech Republic, Germany, Denmark, Austria, Slovakia and Hungary and on domestic InterCity services in the Czech Republic. It is very similar to the interjet trains based on the same Viaggio Comfort carriages used for shorter routes, which do not feature the Afmpz control car.

== History ==
On April 12, 2021, the Siemens Mobility – Škoda Transportation consortium won the competition for the framework contract for the supply of 180 new express wagons for České dráhy. 20 sets consist of 9 Siemens Viaggio Comfort wagons. In March 2022, České dráhy signed a contract with Siemens Mobility for the purchase of 50 Siemens Vectron MS multi-system electric locomotives, which have a maximum operating speed of 230 km/h. The ComfortJet sets will be powered by these locomotives. However, this is not always the case, as previously, the R 9xx Hradečan service was pulled by a ČD Class 162 Locomotive.

== Trainsets ==
A ComfortJet train set consists of nine individual coaches that are permanently coupled with airtight interconnections. The coach furthest from the locomotive acts as a control car. The number of cars in the train can also be expanded by adding regular carriages, as was previously done with WRmz restaurant cars.

== Routes ==
=== Current Services ===
==== RJ Berliner ====
Praha hl. n. - Praha-Holešovice - Ústí and Labem hl.n - Děčín hl.n. - Bad Schandau - Dresden Hbf - Berlin Südkreuz - Berlin Hbf

The train is composed of 9 comfortJet coaches (a combination of Ampz, Bdmpz, Bmpz, Bbmpz, BRmpz and Afmpz), and is pulled by a Siemens Vectron MS locomotive; predominantly the ČD Class 384 (UIC CZ-ČD) rated for 230km/h operation, or, a 200km/h German Class 193 leased from S Rail Lease s.r.o (UIC D-RAILL)

Trial runs including the Afmpz control car have begun on this service. The control car however is not yet used to drive, but only pulled as a standard carriage, and a Siemens Vectron is coupled to the front of the set.

This service was previously an EuroCity (EC) service, but has been recategorised to the Railjet class since the introduction of the ComfortJet railsets.

==== RJ/(RJX) Vindobona ====
(Berlin Hbf - Dresden Hbf - Děčín hl.n. - Ústí and Labem hl.n - Praha-Holešovice) - Praha hl. n. - Pardubice hl. n. - Brno hl. n. - Břeclav - Wien Hbf - (Wien-Meidling - Bruck an der Mur - Graz Hbf - Klagenfurt Hbf - Villach Hbf)

The train is composed of 9 comfortJet coaches (a combination of Ampz, Bdmpz, Bmpz, Bbmpz, BRmpz and Afmpz), and is pulled by a Siemens ES64U4; specifically an ÖBB class 1216 "Taurus III"

Trial runs including the Afmpz control car have begun on this service. The control car however is not yet used to drive, but only pulled as a standard carriage, and a 1216 is coupled to the front of the set.

Some RJ/RJX Vindobona services continue to use first generation Railjet set. On these services, the Afmpz control cars are authorised, and thus are used.

Services from and to Germany do not stop in Praha hl.n.

==== RJ 174/175 Hungaria ====
Hamburg-Altona - Hamburg Hbf - Berlin Hbf - Dresden Hbf - Bad Schandau - Děčín hl.n. - Praha-Holešovice - Pardubice hl.n. - Brno hl.n. - Břeclav - Kúty - Bratislava hl.st. - Štúrovo - Vác - Budapest-Nyugati

The train is composed of 9 comfortJet coaches (a combination of Ampz, Bdmpz, Bmpz, Bbmpz, BRmpz and Afmpz), and is pulled by a Siemens Vectron MS locomotive; predominantly a German Class 193 leased from S Rail Lease s.r.o (UIC D-RAILL), but alternatively a ČD Class 384 (UIC CZ-ČD) or German Class 193 leased from ELL (UIC D-ELOC)

Trial runs including the Afmpz control car have begun on this service. The control car however is not yet used to drive, but only pulled as a standard carriage, and a Siemens Vectron is coupled to the front of the set.

==== RJ 578 Brněnský Drak ====
Brno hl.n. - Blansko - Letovice - Svitavy - Česká Třebová - Ústí nad Orlicí - Choceň - Pardubice hl.n. - Kolín - Praha hl.n. - Praha-Vršovice

The train is composed of 9 comfortJet coaches (a combination of Ampz, Bdmpz, Bmpz, Bbmpz, BRmpz and Afmpz), and is pulled by a Siemens ES64U4; specifically an ÖBB class 1216 "Taurus III"

Trial runs including the Afmpz control car have begun on this service. The control car however is not yet used to drive, but only pulled as a standard carriage, and a 1216 is coupled to the front of the set.

Not all RJ Brněnský Drak services are operated by ComforJet Sets.

==== R 876/879 Svitava ====
Brno hl.n. - Blansko - (Letovice) - Svitavy - Česká Třebová - Ústí nad Orlicí - Choceň - Pardubice hl.n.- Přelouč - Kolín - Praha-Libeň - Praha hl.n. (- Praha-Vršovice)

The train is composed of 9 comfortJet coaches (a combination of Ampz, Bdmpz, Bmpz, Bbmpz, BRmpz and Afmpz), and is pulled by a Siemens Vectron MS locomotive; predominantly a German Class 193 leased from S Rail Lease s.r.o (UIC D-RAILL), but alternatively a ČD Class 384 (UIC CZ-ČD)

Trial runs including the Afmpz control car have begun on this service. The control car however is not yet used to drive, but only pulled as a standard carriage, and a Siemens Vectron is coupled to the front of the set.

ComfortJet sets on R 876 run only on Sunday and on R 879 only on Saturday.

R 876 does not stop in Letovice and Praha-Vršovice.

These are the only R Svitava trains, where ComfortJet sets run. Other R Svitava trains are operated with InterPanter EMUs.

== See also ==
- List of high-speed trains
- Train categories in Europe
