= Siemens Viaggio Comfort =

Passenger railcar model

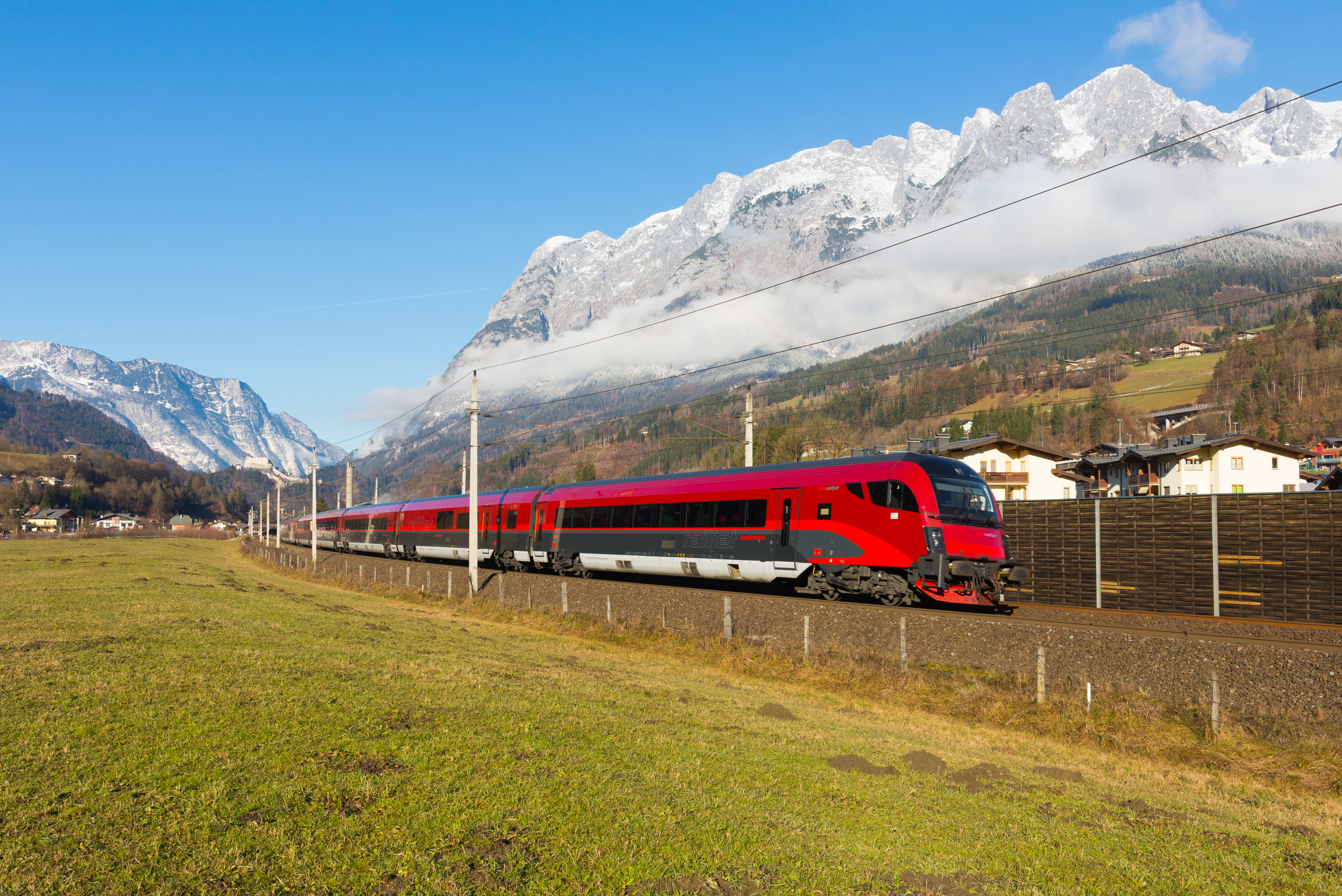
- A Siemens Viaggio Comfort trainset operated by ÖBB Railjet near Pfarrwerfen on Salzburg-Tyrol Railway.

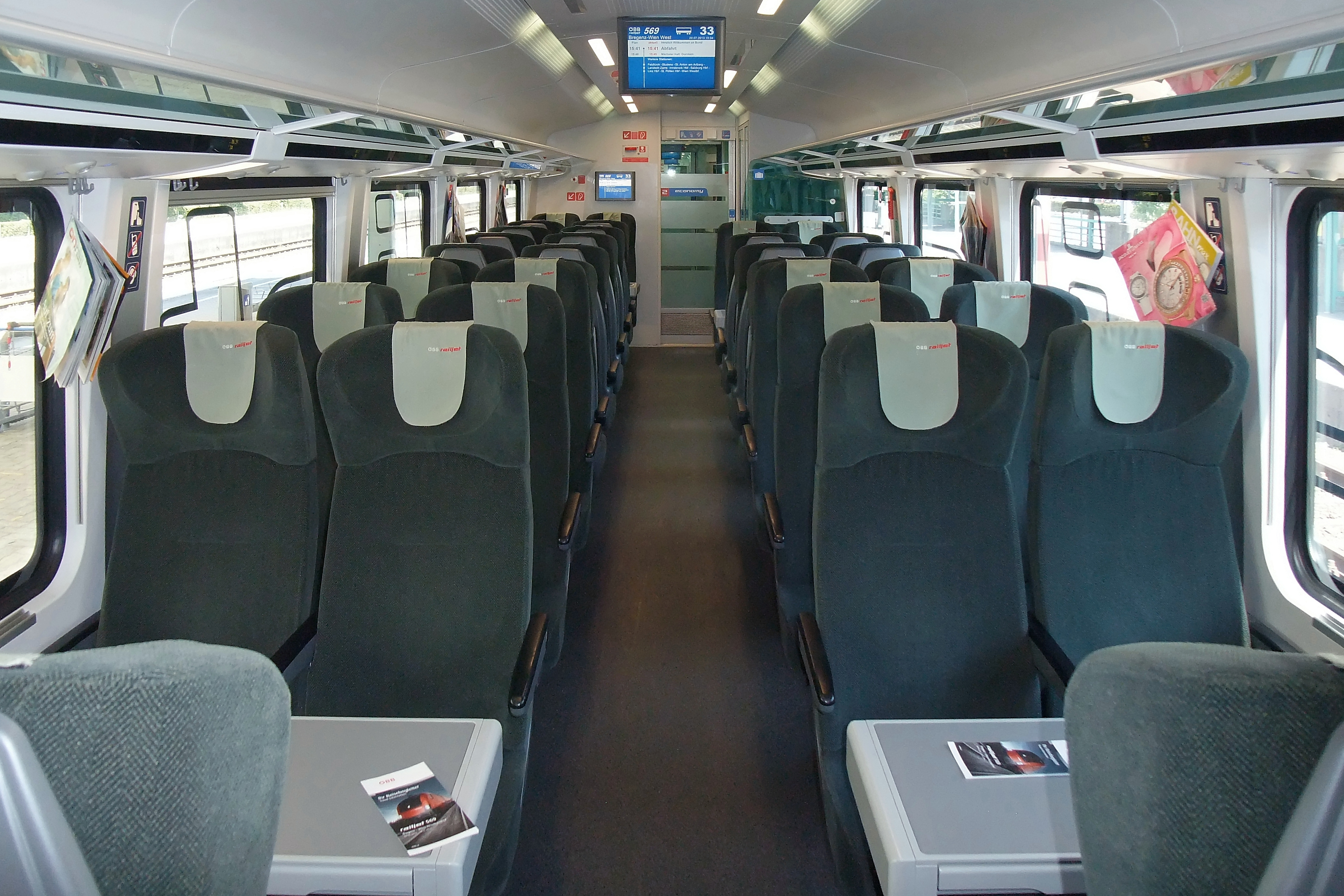
- The interior of a Siemens Viaggo Comfort trainset operated by ÖBB Railjet.
- Stock type: Locomotive-hauled coach
- In service: 2008–present
- Manufacturer: Siemens Mobility
- Built at: Maribor, Slovenia
- Family name: Siemens Viaggio
- Constructed: 2006–present
- Number built: ÖBB: 60 7-car trainsets; ČD: 7 7-car trainsets, 10 5-car trainsets
- Successor: Siemens Viaggio Next Level
- Capacity: ÖBB: 316 (economy) + 76 (first) + 16 (business); ČD: 394 (economy) + 42 (first) + 6 (business)
- Operators: Austrian Federal Railways (ÖBB); Czech Railways (ČD)

Specifications
- Car length: 25.98 m (85 ft 3 in)
- Width: 2.825 m (9 ft 3.2 in)
- Height: 4.05 m (13 ft 3 in)
- Maximum speed: Service: 230 km/h (143 mph); Design: 250 km/h (155 mph)
- Power supply: 480 V AC 60 Hz Head end power
- Braking system: Air
- Coupling system: Buffers and chain
- Track gauge: 1,435 mm (4 ft 8 1/2 in)

Siemens Viaggio Comfort is a brand of locomotive-hauled railroad passenger cars built by Siemens Mobility. The car was designed in the early 2000s and was based on the earlier Siemens Viaggio Classic railcars. The railcars were first used in 2008 on Railjet, a high-speed rail service in Europe operated by the Austrian Federal Railways (ÖBB) and Czech Railways (ČD).

== History ==
Siemens first produced the Viaggio Comfort railcars in response to a request by the Austrian Federal Railways (ÖBB) for locomotive-hauled push-pull trainsets for its upcoming Railjet high-speed rail service. Typically, high-speed rail services use electric multiple units, but ÖBB had recently purchased a fleet of Siemens EuroSprinter electric locomotives that it wanted to continue to use. After a bidding process, it was announced in February 2006 that the Siemens Viaggio Comfort was the best design as well as the least expensive. The initial February 2006 order was for 23 sets of 7-coach trains, which was followed by a second order by ÖBB for 44 more sets in September 2007. The total value of the order was €798 million for 469 passenger carriages.

The industrial design company Spirit Design was contracted to provide an exterior and interior design. The shape of the forward end of the control car (also known as a cab car or driving trailer) was derived from the design of the Siemens EuroSprinter locomotives that the trainsets would be paired with. The trainsets were built at the Siemens factory in Maribor, Slovenia, and the first unit was completed on 15 September 2008, and put on display in several locations including the InnoTrans trade fair before beginning test runs in late 2008. The first Railjet commercial service started on 14 December 2008.

Between September 2011 and May 2012, České dráhy (ČD) negotiated to have seven of the trainsets ordered by ÖBB transferred to it, for use on its high-speed rail service which would also be called Railjet. The Viaggio Comfort railcars went into service with ČD on 15 June 2014.

In July 2018, ČD ordered 10 5-car trainsets from the Siemens Mobility and Škoda Transportation consortium. The units operate on domestic lines between Prague and Cheb via Plzeň or Ústí nad Labem. These units have decreased maximum speed of 200 km/h (125 mph) as they do not feature the control car as part of the car formation. They are branded as InterJet. The commercial service started on 12 December 2021.

In April 2021, ČD ordered another 20 9-car trainsets from the Siemens Mobility and Škoda Transportation consortium. The units will be operated on international services from Prague to Hamburg, Budapest, and Vienna. The shape of the forward end of the control car will be derived from the design of the Siemens Vectron locomotives. The total value of the order is 12.5 billion CZK (approximately €490 million) for 180 passenger carriages.

== Trainsets ==
Most Siemens Viaggio Comfort railcars are configured into semi-permanently coupled trainsets with open gangway-style connections between cars but with standard couplers on the outer ends of the trainset for connecting the trainset to locomotives or other railway equipment.

=== Railjet trainsets ===
A Railjet trainset consists of seven individual coaches: four coaches with economy seating, one coach with a restaurant and a first class seating section, one coach with first class seating, and a control car with a first class seating section and a business class seating section (the most premium class).

The trainsets were manufactured by Siemens in Maribor, Slovenia, with final assembly being completed by ÖBB's technical services department in Simmering, Vienna.

The passenger cars are equipped with electro-pneumatic disc brakes (3 per axle in SF400 bogies), as well as electromagnetic track brakes (eddy current brakes), and a parking brake. The driving trailer also has a manually operated brake using the disc brakes. Primary bogie suspension is by coil spring, and secondary suspension is pneumatic. Brake equipment is supplied by Knorr-Bremse, air-conditioning by Liebherr, and doors, carriage connections, toilets and seats are manufactured by other subcontractors.

=== Vectrain trainsets ===
The Vectrain train set comes in two variants. The ten InterJet sets consist of five individual carriages: three carriages with economy seats and one carriage with first class seats. These trains do not have a control car and can travel at a maximum of 200 km/h. The twenty ComfortJet sets consist of nine individual carriages: six carriages with economy seats, one carriage with a restaurant and a small section of economy seats, one carriage with first class seats and one control car with first class seats. The control car is inspired by the design of the Vectron locomotive. These sets can travel at a maximum of 230 km/h.

The train sets were manufactured in cooperation between Siemens and Škoda Transportation.

== Derived types ==
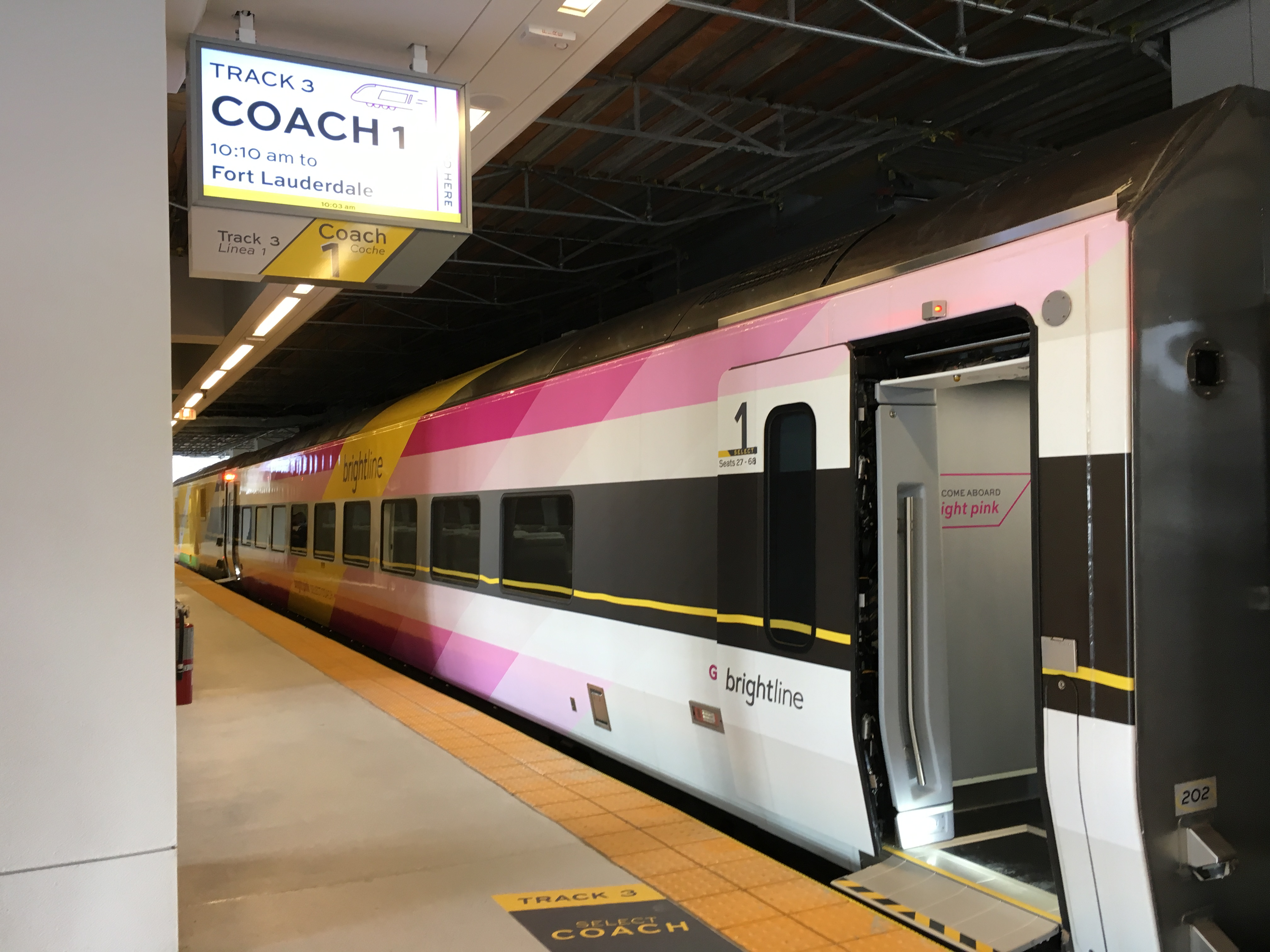
Venture coach used on Brightline.

=== Siemens Venture ===
The Siemens Venture is based on the earlier Siemens Viaggio Comfort railcars in use in Europe, but adapted for the North American market. The cars entered service with Brightline in 2018. Railcars are currently on order for the US states of California, Illinois, Michigan, and Missouri for use on their state-supported corridors operated by Amtrak. Canadian operators Via Rail and Ontario Northland have ordered trainsets for use on the Québec City–Windsor Corridor and for the re-instatement of the Toronto-Timmins Northlander. They are being built in Siemens' Mobility North American factory in Florin, California.

== Gallery ==
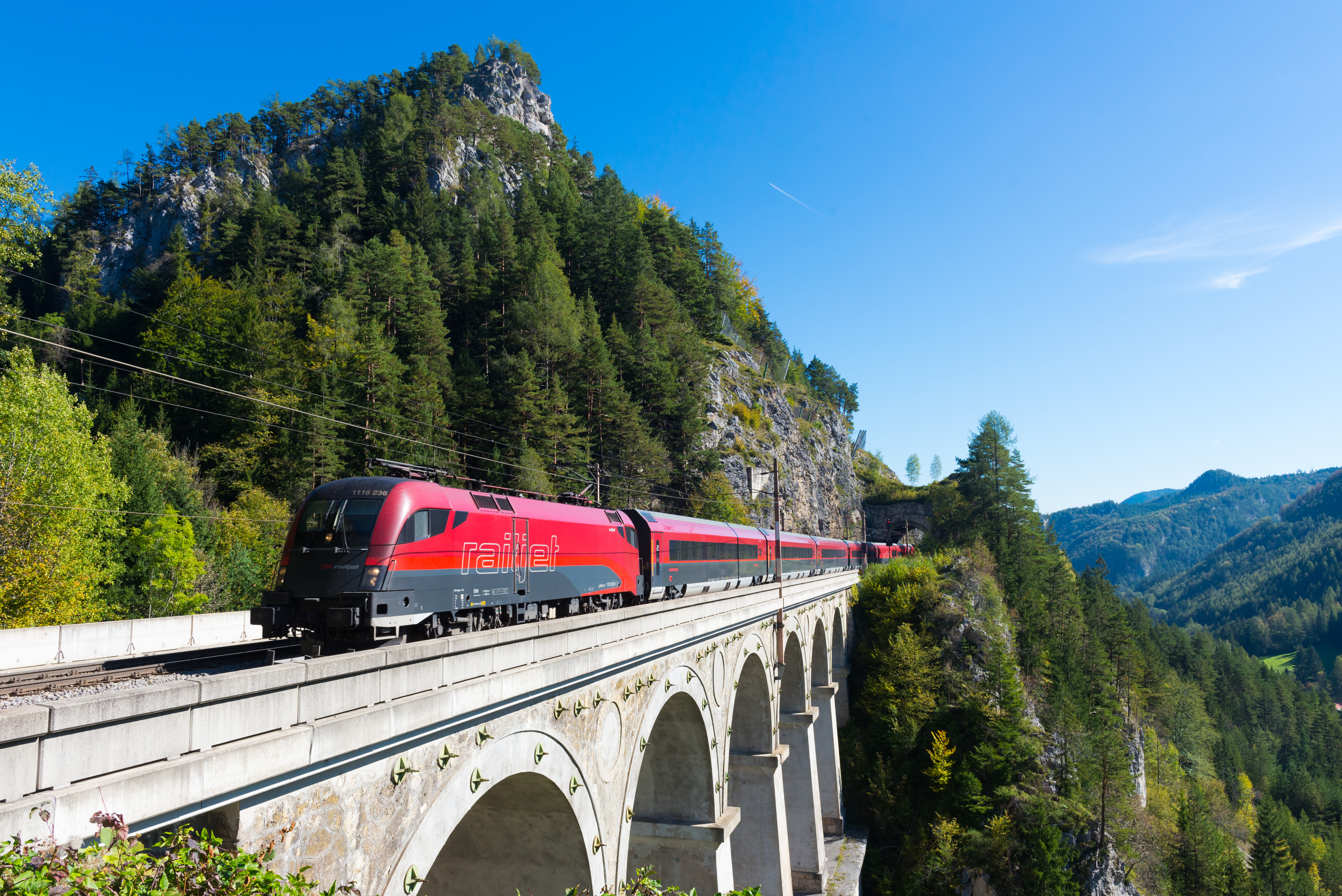
ÖBB Railjet passing over the Krauselklause viaduct on the Semmering railway

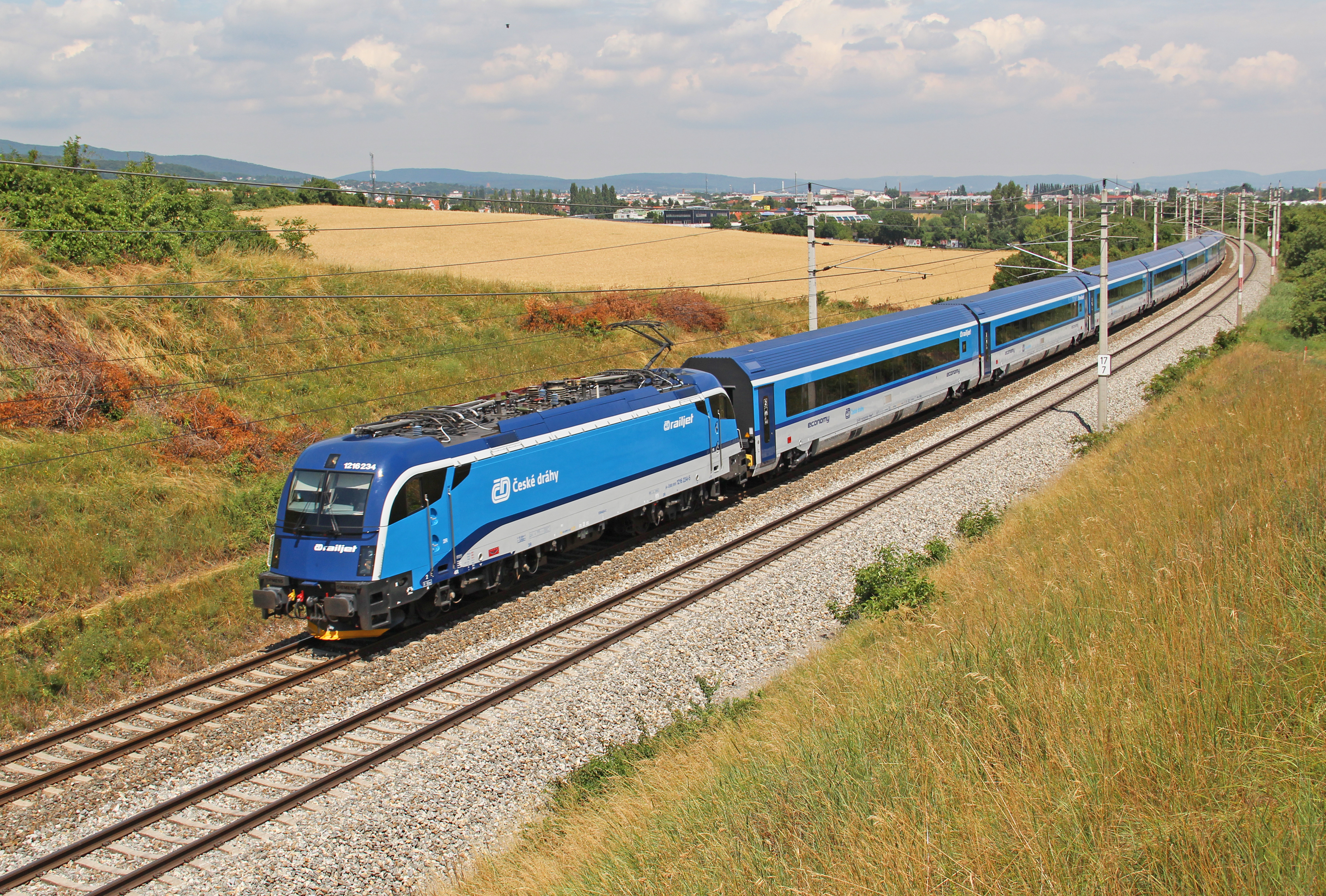
ČD Railjet on its way to Vienna

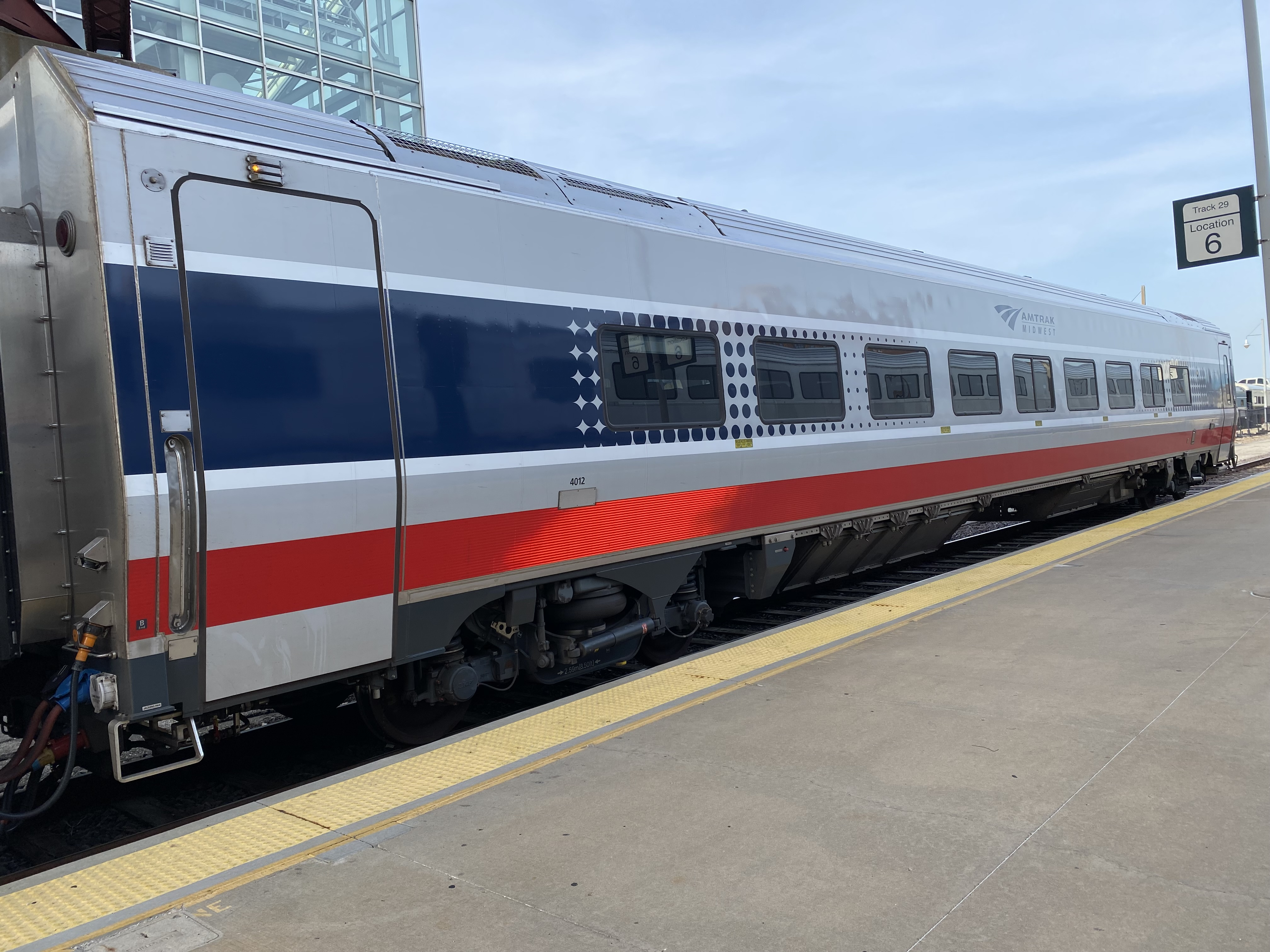
A Venture car used for Amtrak's Midwest routes

Federal Passenger Company (FPC) WLABmz at Fischamend
