= Nightjet =

Brand name for ÖBB's overnight passenger train services

ÖBB Nightjet

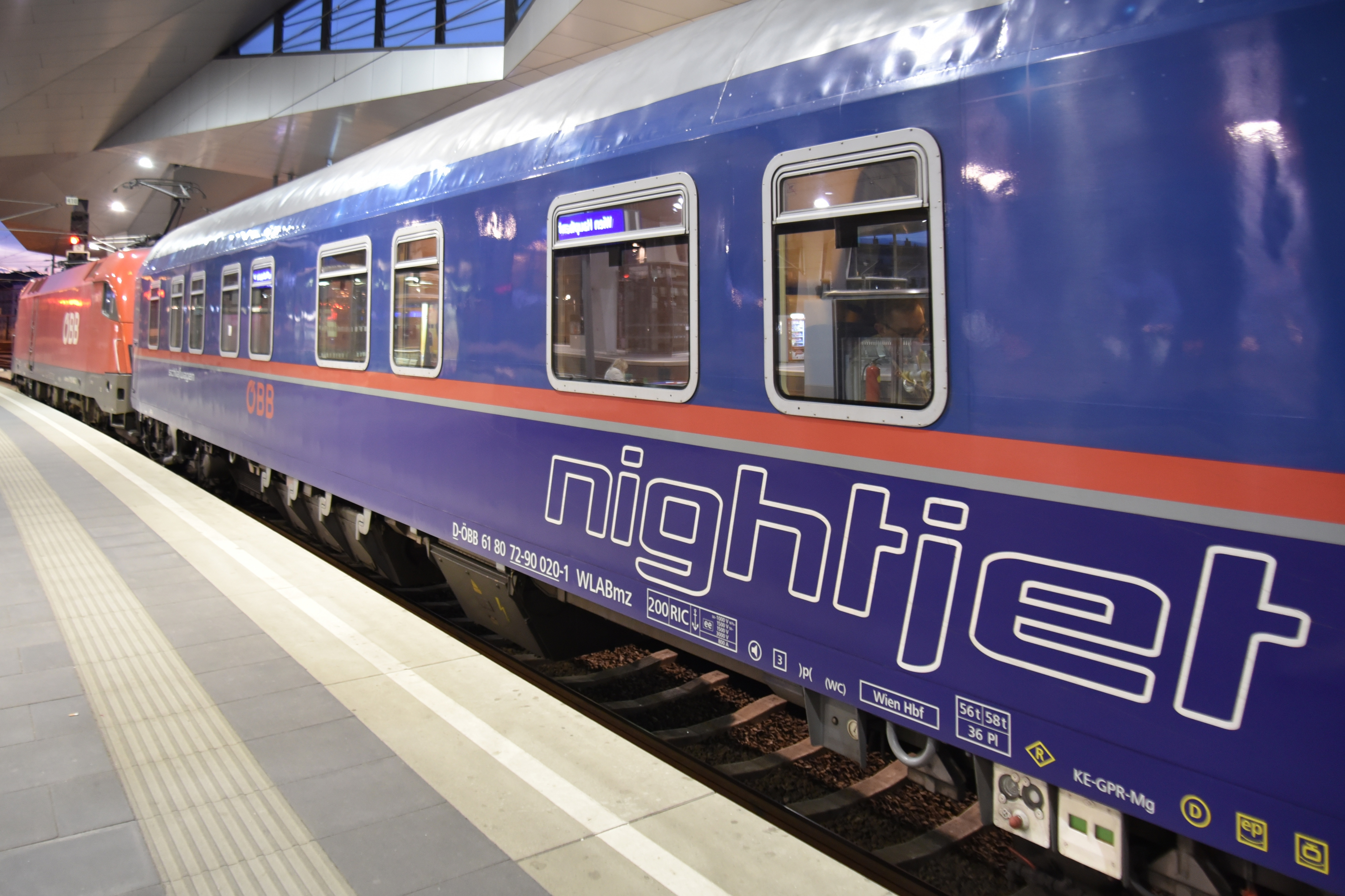

Overview
- Service type: Sleeper train
- Predecessor: City Night Line
- First service: 11 December 2016; 9 years ago
- Current operator: ÖBB
- Website: www.nightjet.com

Nightjet (stylised as nightjet) is a brand name given by the Austrian Federal Railways (ÖBB) to its overnight passenger train services.

Nightjet operates in Austria, Belgium, France, Germany, Italy, the Netherlands, Poland and Switzerland. There are services provided by other train companies to Croatia, Hungary, Poland, Czech Republic, Slovakia and Slovenia that operate under the Nightjet Partner label. Nightjet trains offers beds in sleeper carriages, couchette carriages, and seated carriages. On certain connections within Austria as well as the seasonal service to Croatia, cars can also be transported on the train. Bicycles can be transported in a bike transport bag, or on some trains in special bike racks.

== History ==
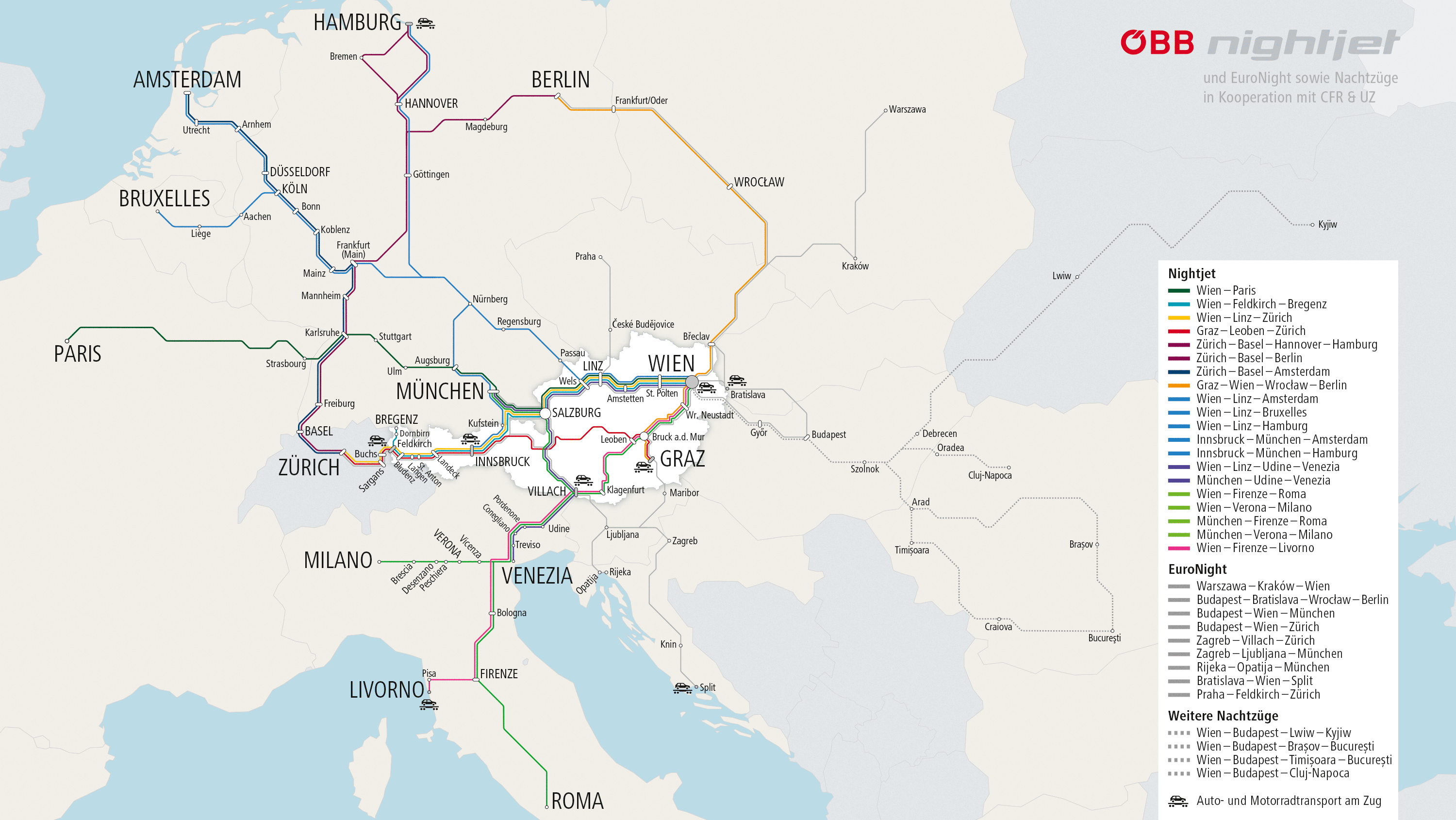
Nightjet Route Map (2023)

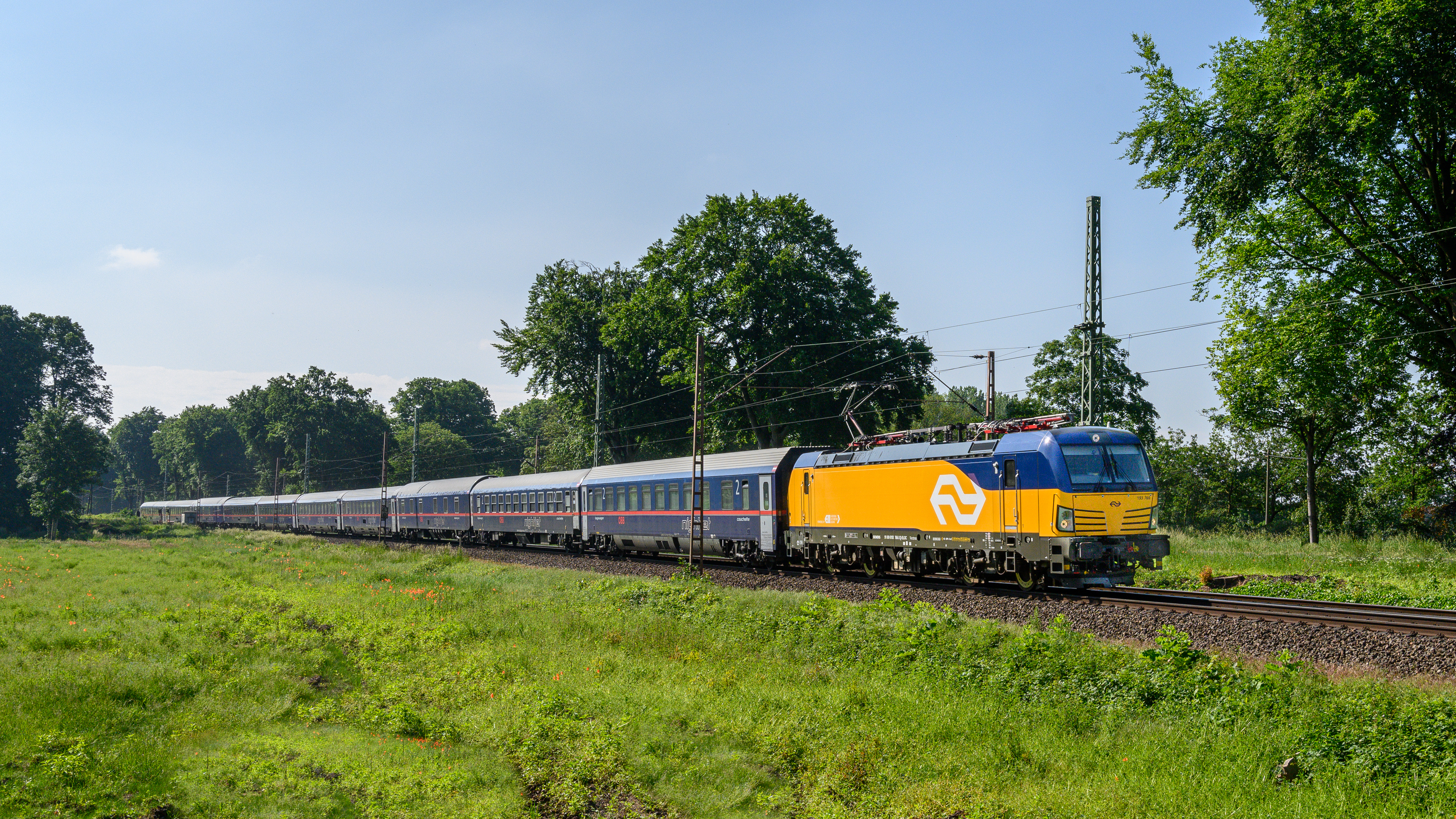
Nightjet 420 from Vienna to Amsterdam

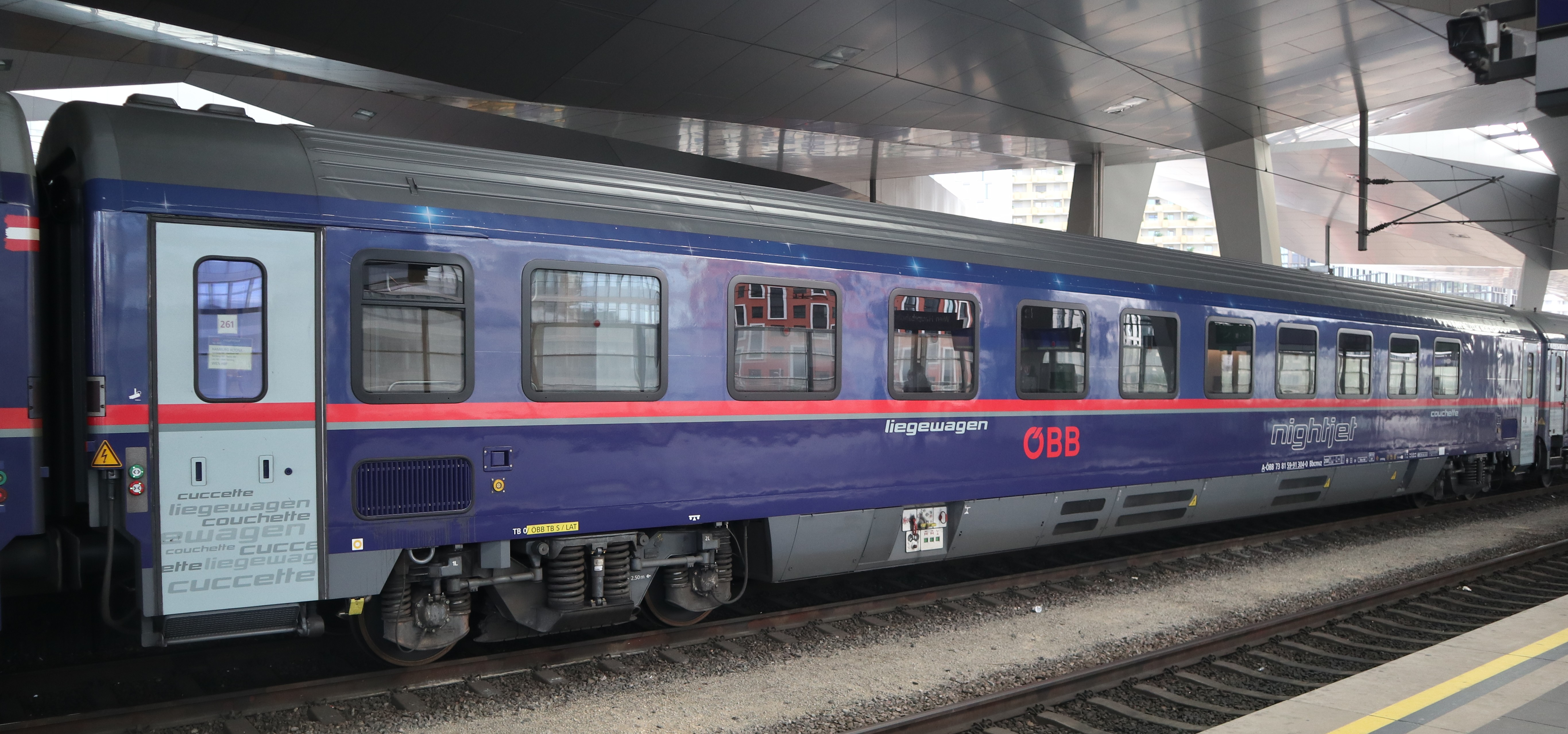
Exterior of a Nightjet couchette car

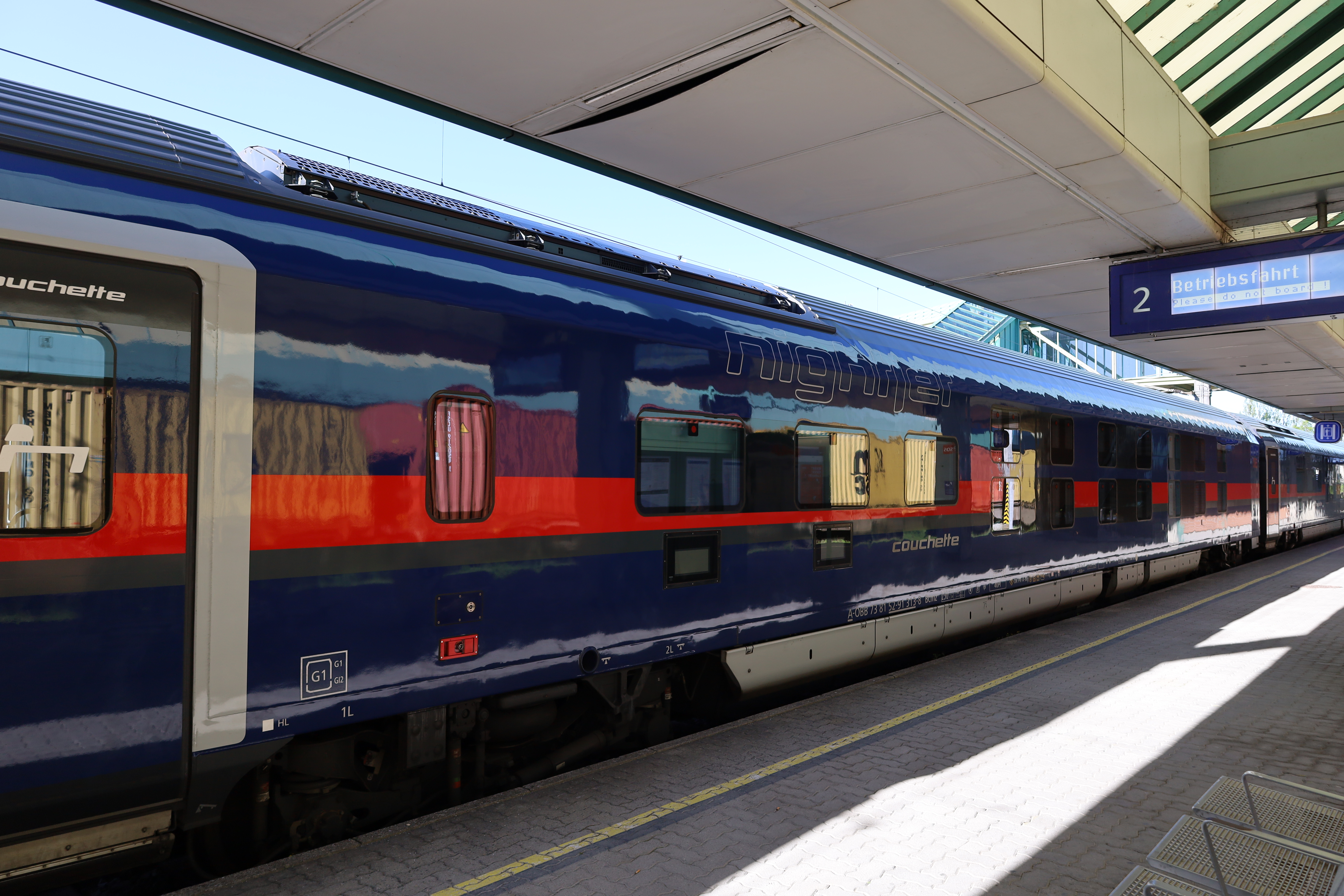
Exterior of a new generation Nightjet 2.0 couchette car

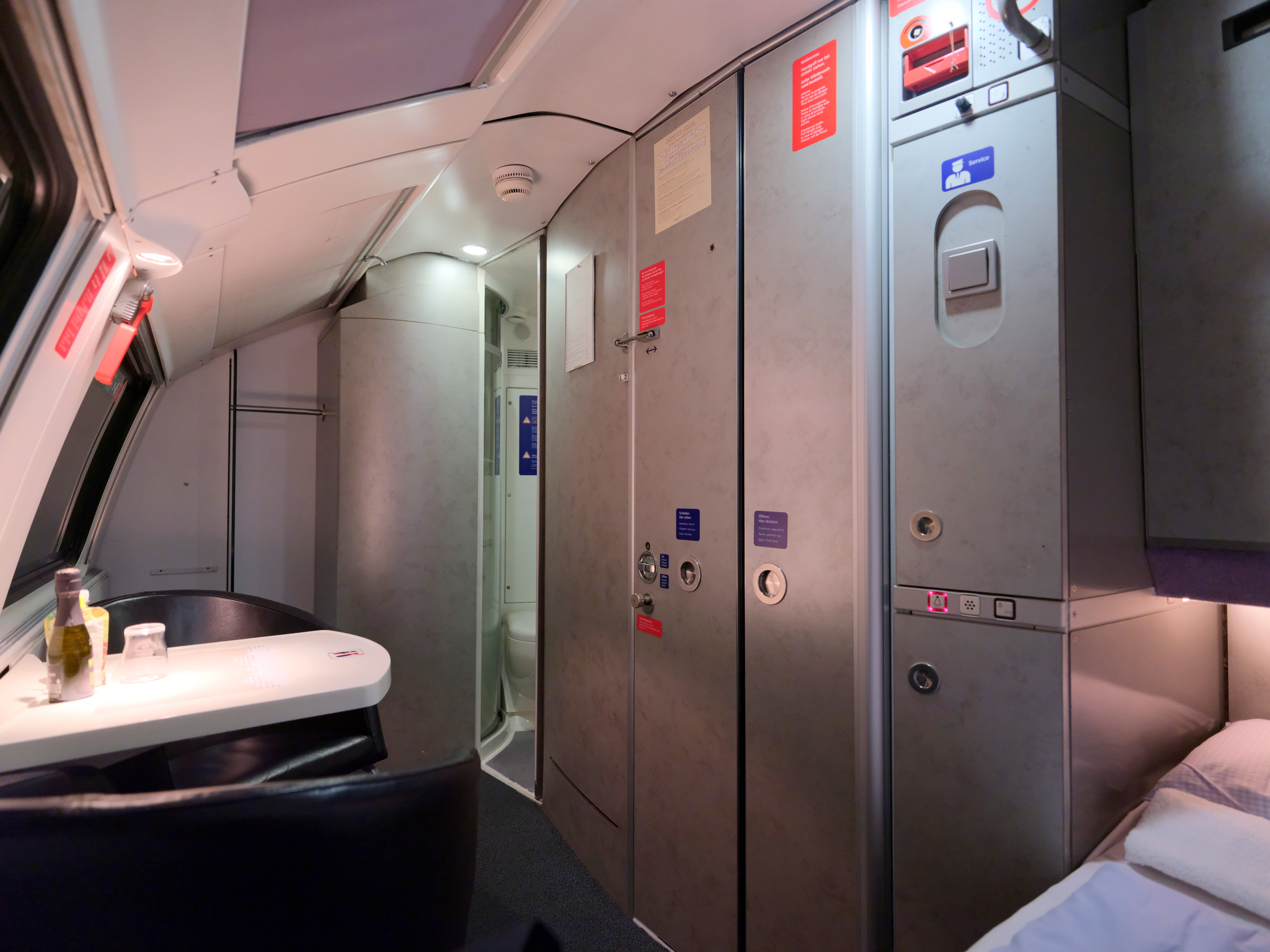
Single/double compartment with shower and restroom on the Doubledeck sleeper cars

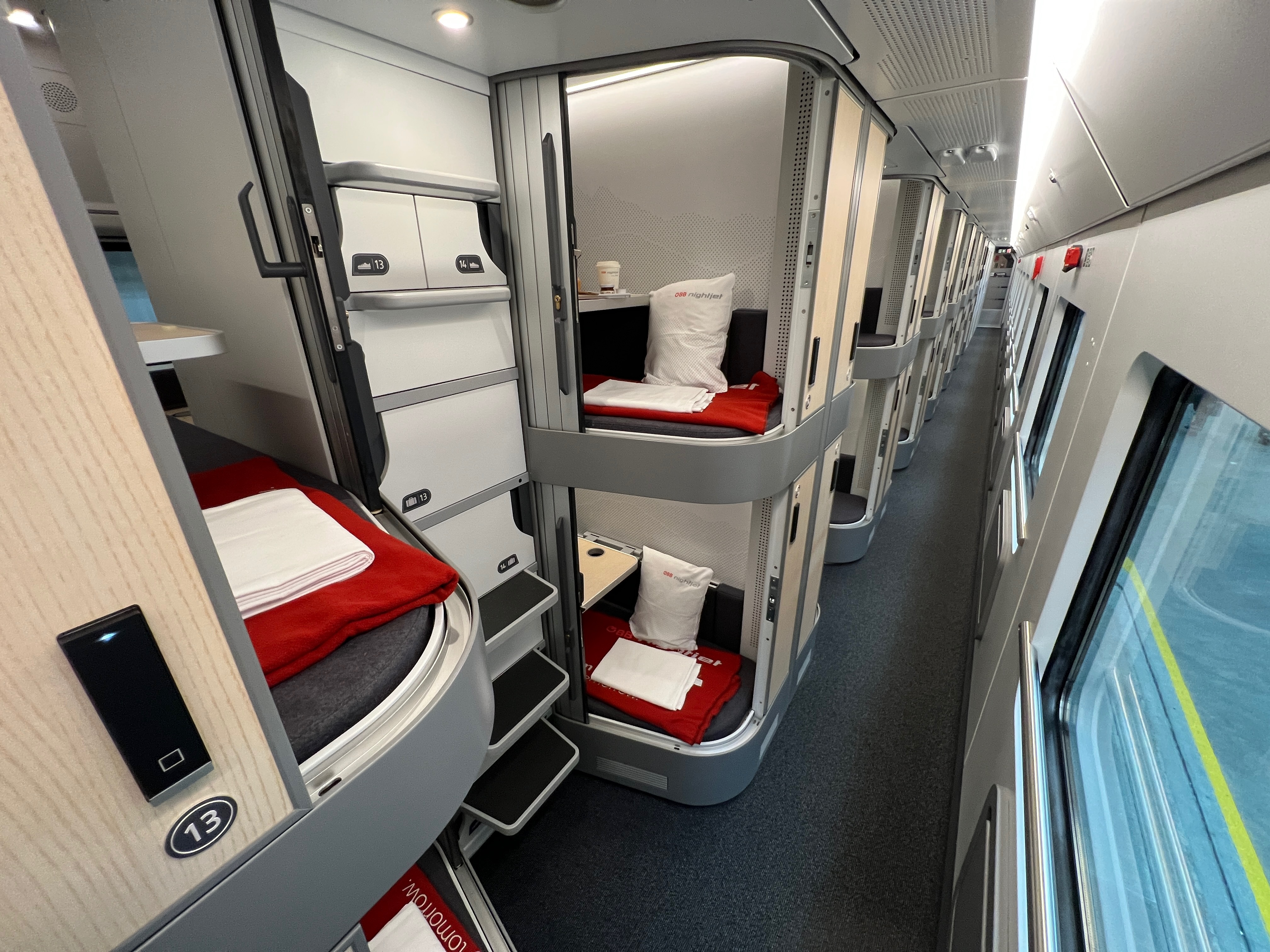
Interior of a new Nightjet mini-suite couchette car

=== Foundation ===
During December 2015, the German state railway company Deutsche Bahn announced that it would stop its night train services under the City Night Line branding and replace them with additional overnight high speed ICE services; this outcome followed years of efforts to turnaround the sector, which the company claimed to be little used, accounting for roughly 1% of all long-distance passengers that year, and thus unprofitable. Even prior to this decision, discussions were underway with the Austrian Federal Railways ÖBB on the topic of continuing traditional night trains in some form. During February 2016, reports emerged that ÖBB was in negotiations with Deutsche Bahn to take over the operation of several night train services. Furthermore, the company was also evaluating its options in regards to rolling stock for operating these services, these included new-build carriages as well as the modernisation of existing rolling stock. Later that year, ÖBB decided to adopt the Nightjet branding for its night train service.

On 11 December 2016, the first Nightjet services were launched; that same month, Deutsche Bahn discontinued its own competing night trains. During February 2017, ÖBB declared that passenger numbers on the Nightjet services were growing.

In August 2019, the Swiss Federal Railways (SBB) and ÖBB jointly announced their plans to expand the passenger services between their two countries; this included the running of Nightjet services between the Swiss cities of Zürich and Basel with the German urban centres of Berlin and Hamburg. Furthermore, the two companies were examining options for the further expansion of the Nightjet network and to provide more overnight connections to Switzerland. That same year, Netherlands Railways (NS) was also discussing options with ÖBB for the provision of night trains through to Amsterdam; in October 2019, it was announced that the Dutch government had agreed to provide a temporarily subsidy for NS and Nightjet to jointly provide daily night trains between Amsterdam, Nürnberg, Munich, Innsbruck, and Vienna.

Usage of the service steadily grew during the 2010s; in October 2019, ÖBB CEO Andreas Matthä stated the passenger traffic on the Nightjet had grown by 10 percent over the year prior. During the first half of 2020, along with the majority of cross-border services in Europe, Nightjet services were temporarily suspended on account of the COVID-19 pandemic; in June 2020, the resumption of regular scheduled operations was announced. In December 2020, four railway companies, including ÖBB, Deutsche Bahn, SBB, and France's SNCF, signed an agreement to cooperate on the development of night train services across Europe; specifically, the launch of four new Nightjet connections between 13 European cities will be prioritised. Two of these services will run between Vienna, Munich, and Paris, as well as Zurich, Cologne, and Amsterdam, starting in December 2021, while services between Vienna and Berlin, and Brussels and Paris, will commence during December 2023. In December 2024, a new service between Zurich and Barcelona should be launched as well but it is uncertain since the Nightjet from Zurich to Rome planned in 2022 was delayed to an unknown date.

In August 2018, ÖBB announced the placement of an initial €375m order for eight Railjet day trains and 13 Nightjet 2.0 night trains as part of a wider €1.5bn framework agreement with the German engineering company Siemens Mobility for a new fleet of long-distance trains, which includes the delivery of up to 700 passenger coaches over the next five years. The new Viaggio coaches, which will be manufactured at Siemens' factory in Vienna, shall be operated with ÖBB's existing fleet of Siemens Taurus locomotives, and be operated in Austria, Germany, Italy and Switzerland, while provisions are present to equip the coaches for use in Croatia, the Czech Republic, Hungary, Poland, Slovakia and Slovenia as well. The seven-car night trains offer 100 seats and 160 berths, and are fully equipped to accommodate passengers with limited mobility. Siemens claims that the Siemens Viaggio Next Level coaches have improved energy efficiency achieved through LED interior lighting, air conditioning via heat pumps in both cooling and heating modes, and a regulated fresh air supply based on the interior CO_{2} levels. Commissioning of the new fleet is expected in 2022, with service entry starting in the summer of 2023.

In October 2019, as a stopgap measure, ÖBB announced its intention to lease sleeping and couchette cars, permitting additional Nightjet services to be operated without having to wait for the delivery of its outstanding Siemens order. Specifically, two options were evaluated; the hiring of four sleeping and four couchette cars between 2020 and 2023 that can operate in Germany, Denmark and Sweden; or eight sleeping cars and eight couchette cars between 2021 and 2022 with approval for operation in Austria, Germany, Switzerland, Belgium and the Czech Republic.

=== Development since 2020 ===
In August 2020, ÖBB received permission by the Austrian federal government to purchase an additional 20 seven-car Nightjet 2.0 trains along with additional locomotives for a combined value of roughly €500m. When combined with previous orders, ÖBB's new-build rolling stock for the Nightjet 2.0 includes 231 new sleeping cars, couchettes, and seated vehicles; the expansion of the fleet will enable the operator to reach more destinations. That same month, as to accommodate the expanding fleet, ÖBB invested €40m into the modernisation and enlargement of the Vienna Simmering depot, which included the construction of a new 5,500m2 maintenance hall with two elevated tracks. In August 2021, a further 20 seven-car Nightjets, based on the new generation Siemens Viaggio Next Level, were ordered from Siemens Mobility.

Despite these stop-gap measures, in 2023 passengers were affected by cancellations and delays. This included "downgrades", in which customers who had reserved sleeping berths were informed on the train that they must travel in seated coaches as there were no sleeping carriages available.

The 'new generation' of Nightjet 2.0 services were launched on ÖBB's 100th anniversary in 2023. Newly designed, more comfortable carriages built by Siemens Mobility were announced on 2 October 2023 for the 2024 schedule, starting 10 December 2023, initially on routes from Hamburg to Innsbruck and Vienna.

== Network ==
As of 2024, the following Nightjet services are operated:

Operator	Train number	Route
ÖBB	NJ 446/447	Vienna – Linz – Innsbruck – Feldkirch – Bregenz
ÖBB	NJ 464/465	Graz – Leoben – Innsbruck – Feldkirch – Zurich
ÖBB	NJ 466/467	Vienna – Linz – Salzburg – Innsbruck – Zurich
ÖBB	NJ 468/469	Vienna – Linz – Salzburg – Munich – Karlsruhe – Strasbourg – Paris
ÖBB	NJ 401/40470	Hamburg – Frankfurt – Freiburg – Basel – Zurich
ÖBB	NJ 471/470	Berlin – Frankfurt – Freiburg – Basel – Zurich
ÖBB	NJ 456/457	Graz – Vienna – Wroclaw – Frankfurt/Oder – Berlin
ÖBB	NJ 490/491	Vienna – Linz – Nuremberg – Hanover – Hamburg
ÖBB	NJ 40490/40421	Vienna – Linz – Nuremberg – Frankfurt – Cologne – Düsseldorf – Amsterdam
ÖBB	NJ 420/421	Innsbruck – Munich – Frankfurt – Cologne – Düsseldorf – Amsterdam
ÖBB	NJ 402/403	Zurich – Basel – Bonn-Beuel – Cologne – Eindhoven – Utrecht – Amsterdam
ÖBB	NJ 50490/425	Vienna – Linz – Nuremberg – Cologne – Brussels
ÖBB	NJ 40420/40491	Innsbruck – Munich – Nuremberg – Hanover – Hamburg
ÖBB	NJ 40233/40294	Vienna – Villach – Bologna – Florence – Rome
ÖBB	NJ 40466/236	Vienna – Linz – Salzburg – Villach – Udine – Venice
ÖBB	NJ 295/294	Munich – Salzburg – Villach – Bologna – Florence – Rome
ÖBB	NJ 40295/40235	Munich – Salzburg – Villach – Verona – Milan – Genova – La Spezia
ÖBB	NJ 236/237	Stuttgart – Munich – Salzburg – Villach – Udine – Venice (Stuttgart since December 2022)
ÖBB	NJ 233/235	Vienna – Klagenfurt – Villach – Padua – Vicenza – Verona Porta Nuova – Brescia – Milan Rogoredo – Genoa Piazza Principe – La Spezia
ÖBB	NJ 40424/40469	Berlin – Erfurt – Frankfurt/Main – Strasbourg – Paris
ÖBB	NJ 424/425	Berlin – Erfurt – Mannheim – Cologne – Brussels

== See also ==
- Rail transport in Europe
- Train categories in Europe
- EuroNight
