= LS 90 =

Czech and Slovak railway signalling system

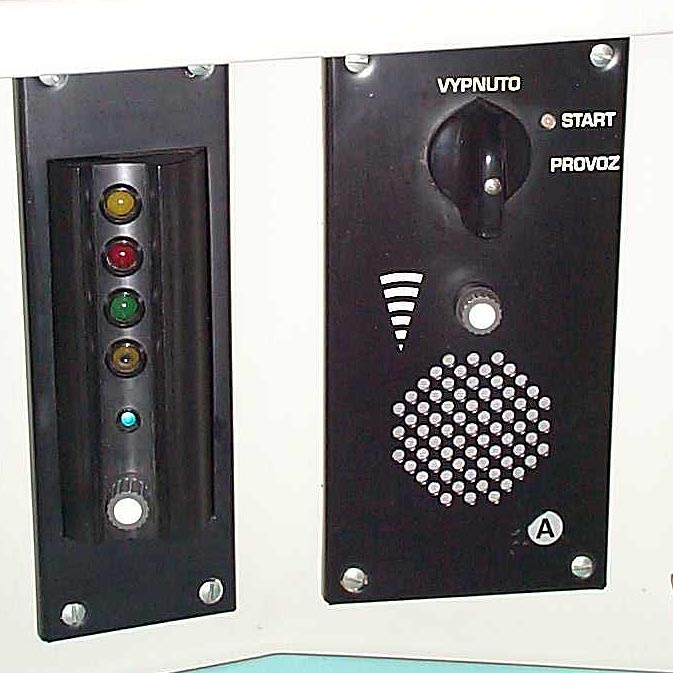
LS 90 and Control Panel

LS (abbreviation of liniový systém in Czech, literally 'line system', also translated as 'continuous system') is a cab signalling and train protection system used on the main lines of Czech and Slovak railways (mandatory on all lines where track speed exceeds 100 km/h in the Czech republic or 120 km/h in Slovakia). This system continuously transmits and shows a signal aspect of the next main signal in the driver's cabin while also periodically checking the driver's vigilance when their attention is required (e.g. a speed reduction).

The on-board part of the system has two main functions: showing the next signal and checking the driver's vigilance. The signal aspect is shown on a dedicated panel in the driver's cabin, usually one of 4 lights (yellow, red, green, yellow annulus), corresponding to the four signal aspects. The panel also includes a blue light, indicating that driver's attention is not required. Unlike some vigilance systems, the LS checks on driver's vigilance only by pressing the "vigilance" button (also called Živák in Czech). The system periodically shows both visual and auditory warnings. If the driver fails to respond, it applies the emergency brakes.

The trackside part of the LS-system is based on coded track circuits using a carrier frequency of 75 Hz with 100% amplitude modulation (on-off keying). The signal aspect of the next signal is coded in the following modulation frequencies:

- Red signal – 0.9 Hz – the next signal is the stop aspect. If the red signal is flashing (done by interrupting the signal), this means that the next signal is a repeat-caution aspect, signifying that the stop aspect is at a distance shorter than the braking distance of the train.
- Yellow annulus – 1.8 Hz – the train must slow down to a reduced speed (usually 40 km/h)
- Yellow signal – 3.6 Hz – the next signal is a caution aspect (precedes a stop aspect), or expect a speed limit shown on the track side signal or sign.
- Green signal – 5.4 Hz – the next signal shows the free aspect, there is no attention required by the driver.

The trackside part of the LS-system became an integral part of every Automatic Block used on the railroads of the Czech Republic and Slovakia. Almost all rail vehicles are equipped with a train protector compatible with the LS-system, such as the LS II–IV, LS 90, LS 06 or MIREL VZ1.

== Mirel VZ1 ==
Mirel VZ1 is the newest generation of LS-compatible on-board train protectors. Unlike older devices, the VZ1 generates a braking curve according to a received restrictive signal. However the trackside part of the LS-system doesn't offer enough information to generate a usable braking curve. For this reason, the generated braking curve is so restrictive that its use is questionable. The driver has two choices: either regulating the speed so that it is lower than the generated speed to prevent emergency braking application, or using manual mode where no braking curve is generated (only checking the driver's vigilance).

The Mirel VZ1 has an optional ability to decode the Hungarian EVM 120 and the Polish SHP train safety systems. For this reason, most new vehicles are equipped with Mirel VZ1, such as the Škoda 380/381 locomotives, as opposed to the LS90 on-board unit, to extend operations to Hungary and Poland.
