= Siemens Vectrain =

Locomotive hauled trains

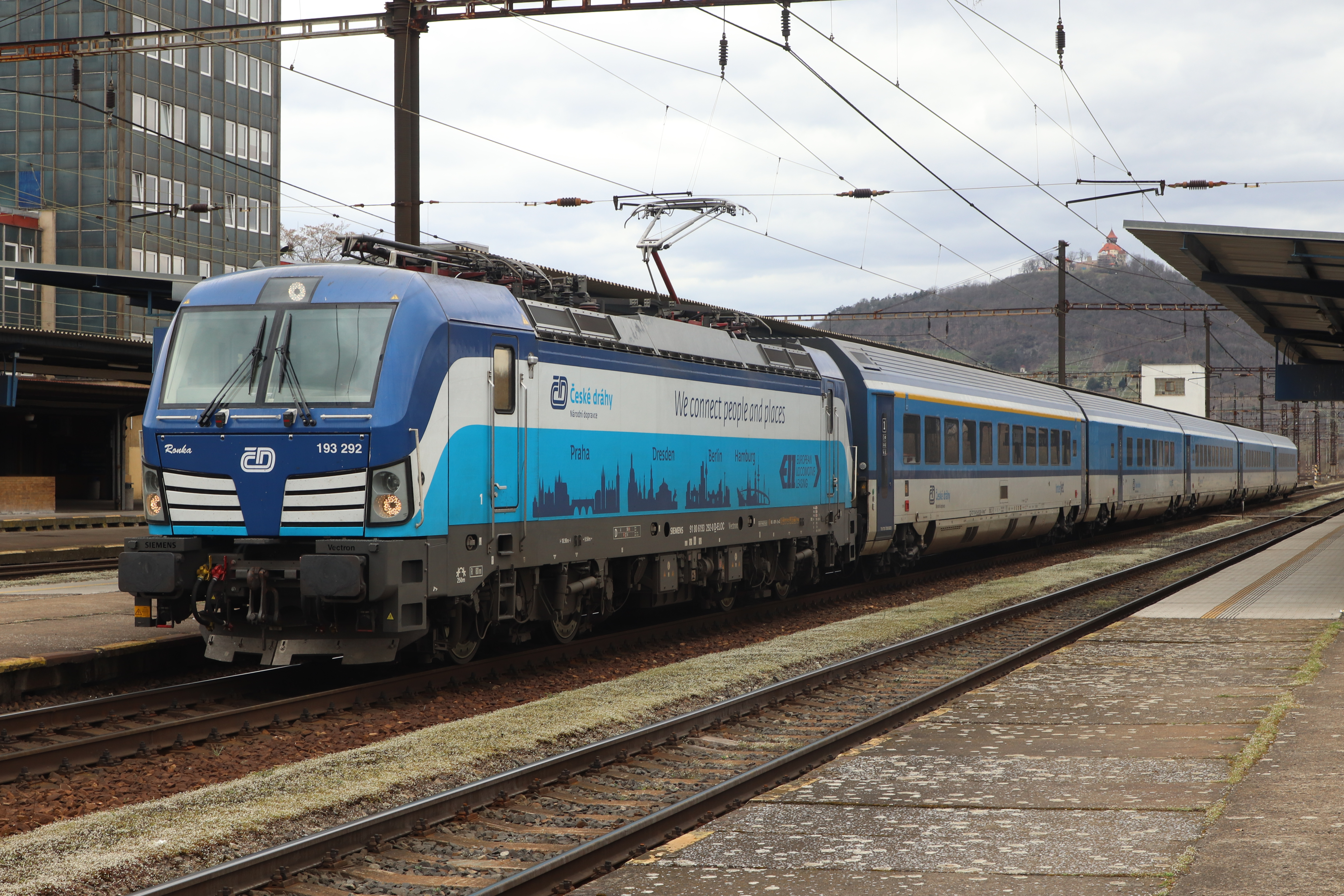
- České dráhy InterJet
- In service: 2021–present
- Manufacturers: Siemens Mobility, Škoda Transportation
- Built at: Graz, Austria, Wien, Austria, Munich, Germany, Ostrava, Czech Republic
- Constructed: 2018-present
- Number under construction: ComfortJet: 20 9-car trainsets
- Number built: InterJet: 10 5-car trainsets
- Capacity: InterJet: 278 (economy) + 55 (first); ComfortJet: 456 (economy) + 99 (first)
- Operator: České dráhy (ČD)

Specifications
- Car length: 25.98 m (85 ft 3 in)
- Width: 2.825 m (9 ft 3.2 in)
- Height: 4.05 m (13 ft 3 in)
- Maximum speed: InterJet: 200 km/h (120 mph); ComfortJet: 230 km/h (140 mph)
- Braking system: Air
- Coupling system: Buffers and chain
- Track gauge: 1,435 mm (4 ft 8 1/2 in)

Siemens Vectrain is a family of locomotive-hauled push-pull trains built by Siemens Mobility. The Vectrain consists of a Vectron locomotive and Vectouro coaches or other coaches certified by Siemens. The last coach can be a control car, which has a cabin identical to Vectron locomotives. The trains are mostly used for InterCity and EuroCity services.

Siemens developed its Siemens Vectrain based on the Railjet trains. České dráhy were the first to order Vectrain trains. The trains are in operation in the Czech Republic and will be operated in Austria, Denmark, Germany, Hungary and Slovakia.

== Czech Republic ==
=== ComfortJet ===
In April 2021 České dráhy ordered 180 new express wagons from the Siemens Mobility and Škoda Transportation. 20 sets of 9 Siemens Vectouro cars with Siemens Vectron MS multi-system electric locomotive will have a maximum speed of 230 km/h. The units will operate on domestic and international connections between Prague and Berlin, Dresden, Budapest, Bratislava, Copenhagen, Hamburg, Brno, Graz, Villach or Vienna.

=== InterJet ===
In July 2018 the České dráhy ordered 10 5-car trainsets from the Siemens Mobility and Škoda Transportation consortium. The units operate on domestic lines between Prague and Cheb via Plzeň or Ústí nad Labem. These units have decreased maximum speed of 200 km/h (124 mph) as they do not feature the control car as part of the car formation. They are branded as InterJet. The commercial service started on 12 December 2021.
