= Transport in Vienna =

Overview of the transport system of Vienna

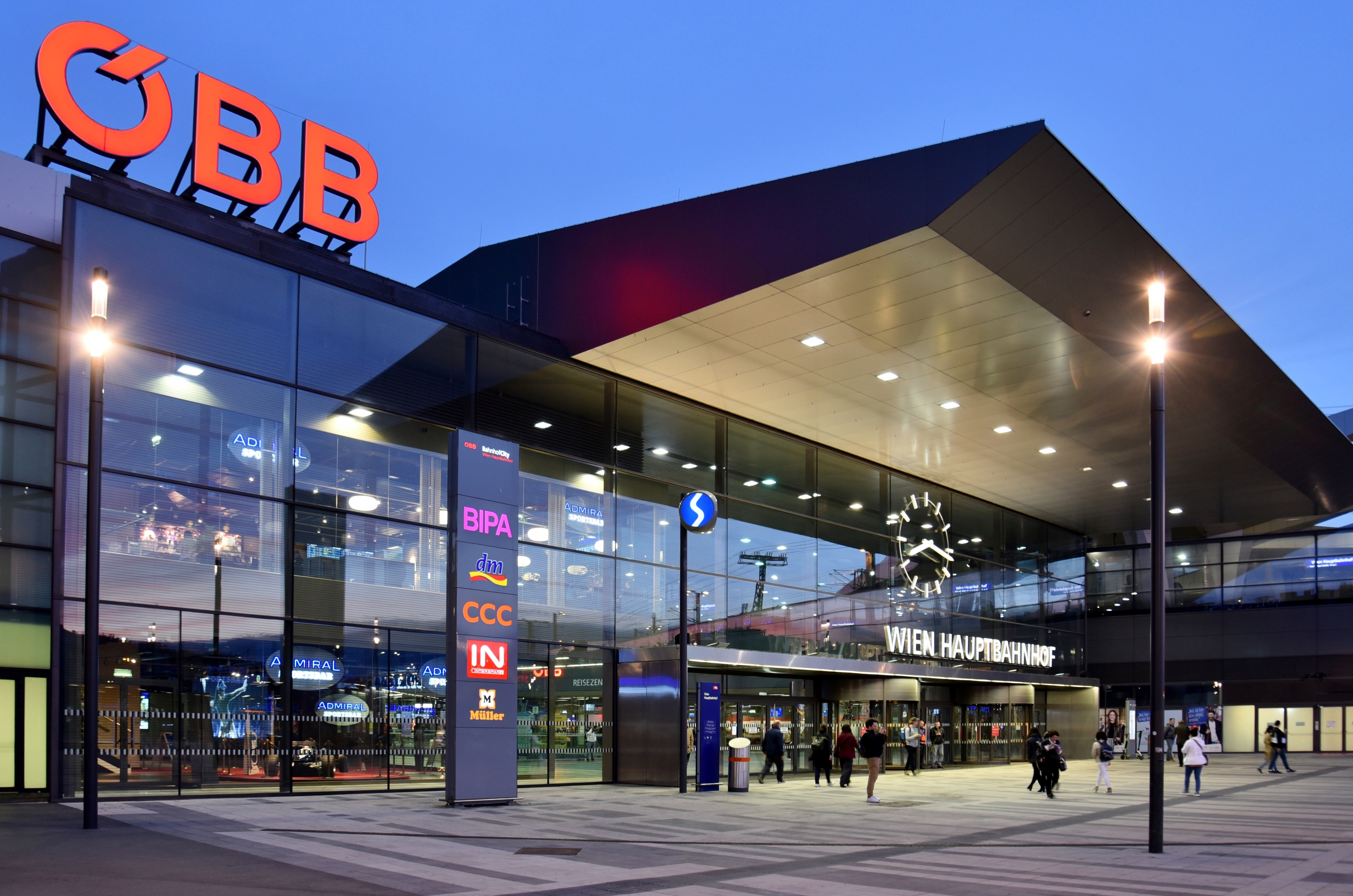
Wien Hauptbahnhof, the main railway station in Vienna

Vienna metro and suburban lines (2025)

Map of the S-Bahn inside Vienna city

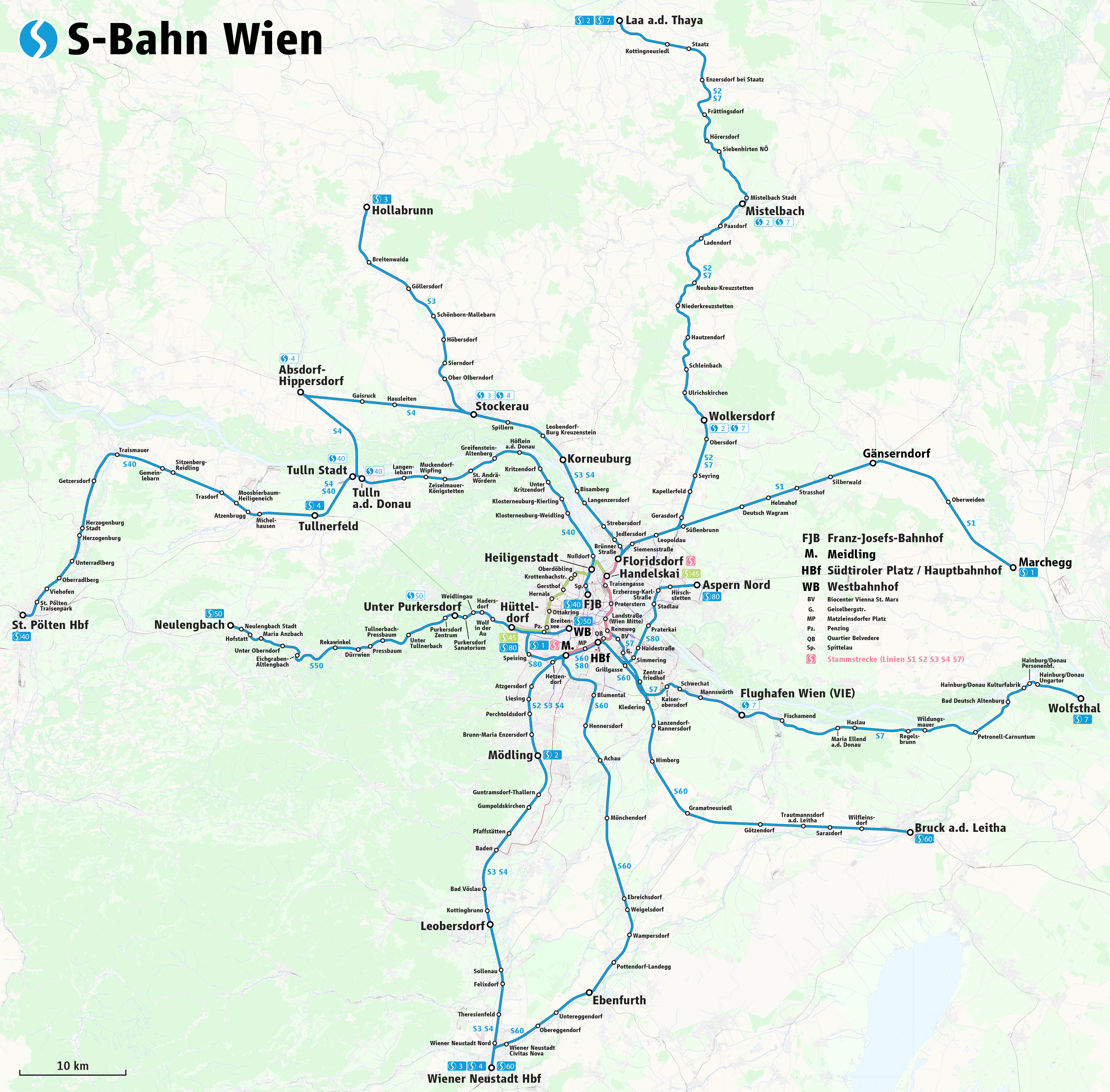
Map of the complete S-Bahn system

Map of Vienna's tramway network

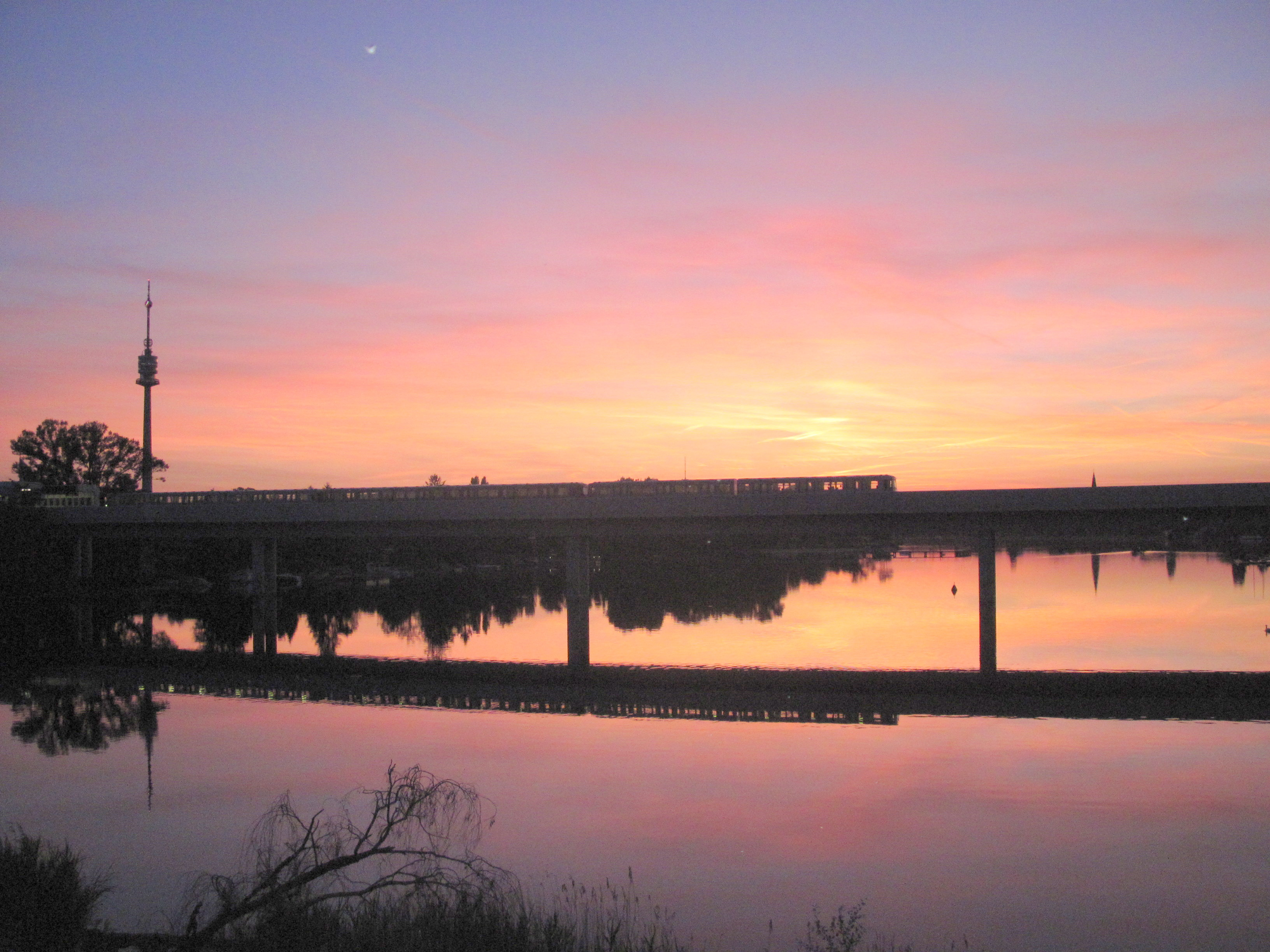
U-Bahn train over Old Danube

Transport association Verkehrsverbund Ost-Region (VOR)

Vienna has an extensive transport system that includes roads, railways, trams, metro, and buses.

== Public transport ==
Vienna has a large public transport network.

- Vienna S-Bahn
- Vienna U-Bahn
- Local Railways (Lokalbahn Wien-Baden)
- Wiener Linien (= Vienna Lines, municipal company operating the U-Bahn, Vienna's tramway network, and most bus routes)
- Carsharing (= cars parked in the city you can rent per minute DriveNow)

Vienna has an extensive train and bus network. The convenience and flexibility of the public transport system is reflected by its popularity; 53% of Viennese workers travel to their workplace by public transport. The overall modal split was 39% public transport and 27% private transport in 2016, compared to 29% and 40% respectively in 1993.

Fares within the city cover all modes of public transport and are available for various time periods, such as for 24 hours, calendar weeks and calendar months. Tourist and yearly tickets are also available. Passengers must buy tickets prior to boarding or entering a station; however, on buses and trams, tickets can be bought or validated on board. There are no ticket barriers or inspections when entering public transit system, however transit inspectors - often in plainclothes - do conduct random ticket inspections on certain lines.

Vienna's public transport services are incorporated into a larger intermodal system, the Verkehrsverbund Ost-Region (VOR). VOR includes railway and bus lines in Vienna and the nearby states of Lower Austria and Burgenland. Outside the core zone of Vienna, which uses a flat fare, ticket prices are calculated based on distance.

== Airports ==
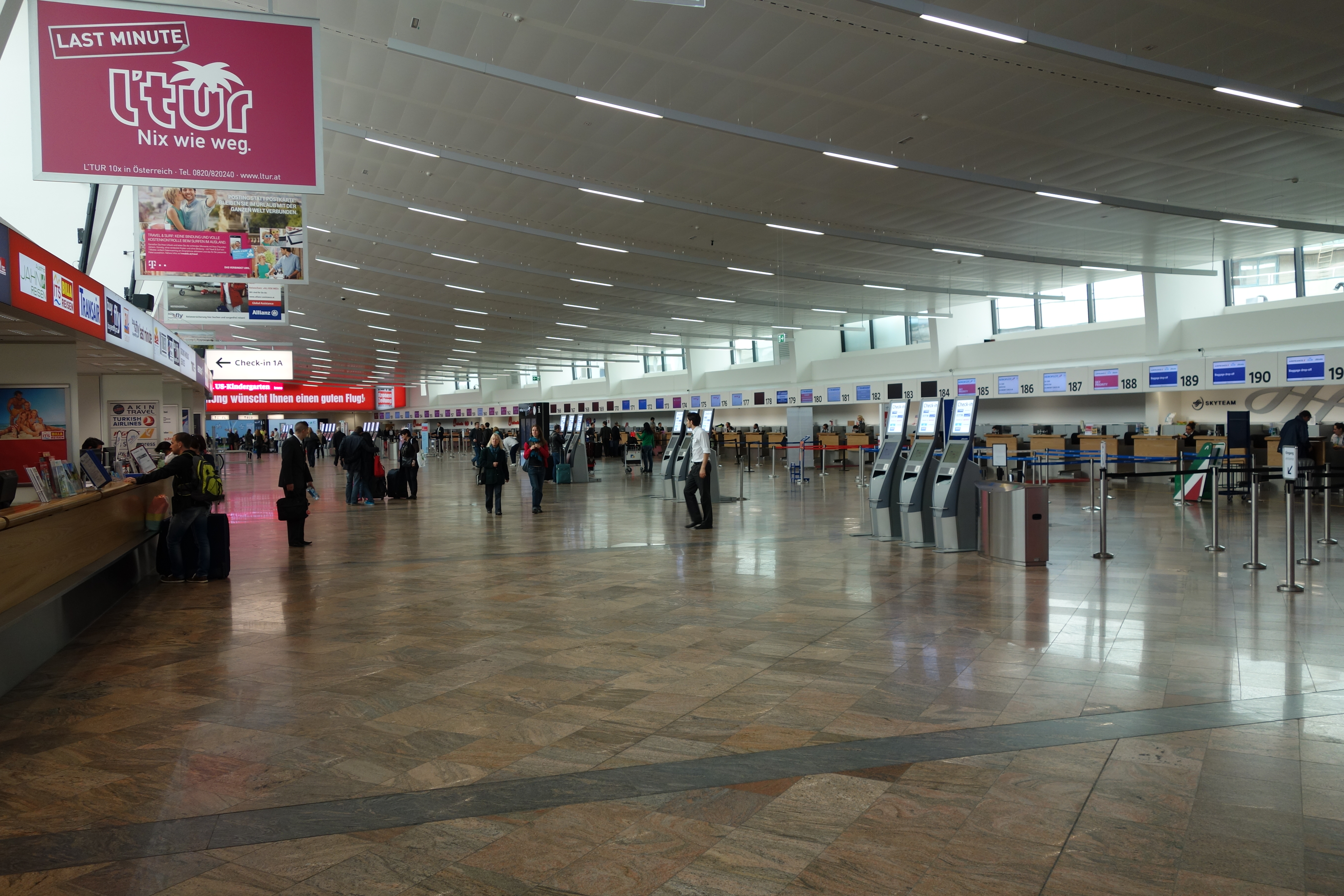
Vienna International Airport

Vienna International Airport is located to the southeast of Vienna. The airport handled 22 million passengers in 2012. Following lengthy negotiations with surrounding communities, the airport will be expanded to increase its capacity by adding a third runway. The airport is currently undergoing a major expansion, including a new terminal building opened in 2012 to prepare for an expected increase in passengers. Another airport that's rather close to the city is Bratislava Airport in Slovakia. The airport is primarily used by low-cost airlines, such as Ryanair. It is a few kilometres away from the city, meaning that Bratislava & Vienna share each other's airports, due to the fact that both cities are not far away from each other.

== Water ==
- Vienna is connected to Rotterdam and German industrial areas via the Rhine-Main-Danube Canal, and to Eastern European countries along the Danube to the Black Sea. Construction on a Danube-Oder Canal was begun during the Nazi era but remains unfinished, though it may be completed in the future.
- The Twin City Liner boat service connects Vienna and Bratislava.
- Nearly all of Vienna's drinking water is brought from the Alps to the city via two large water pipelines, built in the late 19th and early 20th centuries. The pipelines stretch 120 km (75 mi) and 200 km (120 mi) from the Alps to Hietzing (the city's 13th district). The Alpine sources are pristine and the water does not require treatment.

== Railways ==
Trains are operated by the ÖBB. Historically, all transport was oriented towards the main cities in the Austro-Hungarian monarchy. Vienna has two remaining train terminals that form the beginning of several train lines:

- Wien Franz-Josefs-Bahnhof, the starting point of the Franz-Josefs-Bahn
- Wien Westbahnhof, starting point of the West railway

There are also several through train stations:

- Wien Hauptbahnhof, a new central station that replaced two former terminals. It became the main long-distance station upon full opening in 2014.
- Wien Hütteldorf on the West railway
- Wien Heiligenstadt on the Franz Joseph Railway
- Wien Praterstern (Formerly known as Wien Nord or Wien Nord-Praterstern) on the North railway
- Wien Meidling on the South railway. This is Vienna's most frequented transit station.
- Wien Mitte (Landstraße) on the S-Bahn trunk line; it is the nearest railway station to the centre of the city.

There are also a large number of smaller stations that are important for local passenger traffic. Since the mid-1990s, the Westbahnhof and Südbahnhof have handled all long-distance travel. Many trains also stop at Hütteldorf or Meidling, especially when inbound.

In order to bundle all long-distance traffic it has become necessary to build a tunnel, colloquially known as the Wildschweintunnel ("boar tunnel"), underneath Lainzer Tiergarten linking the Western Railway to the Southern Railway. The new bundled train line will connect to the new Wien Hauptbahnhof that is being constructed on the site of the previous Südbahnhof.

== Roads ==
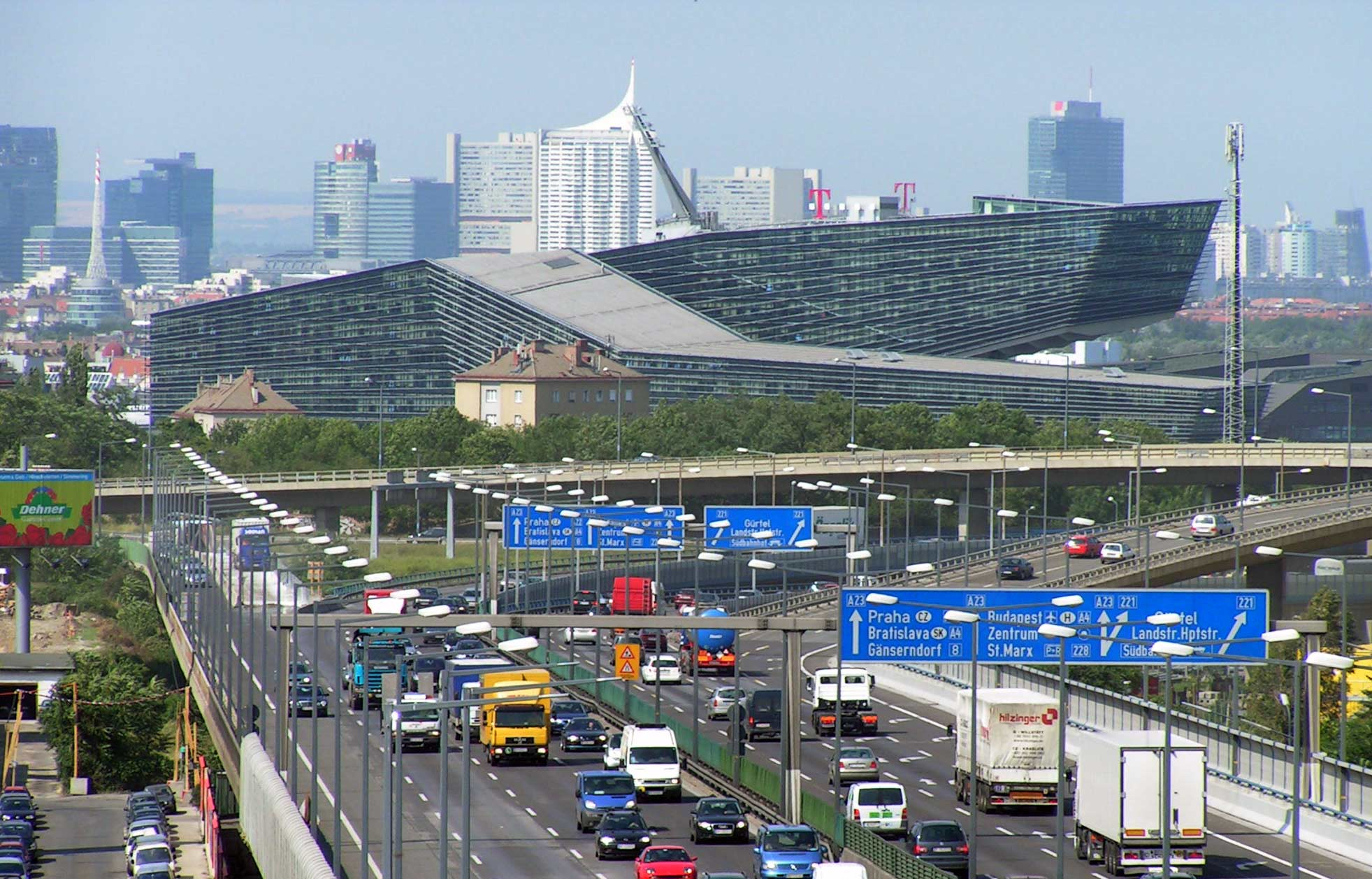
A23 autobahn in Vienna

As in Austria generally, national highways are referred to as Bundesstrassen. Higher-capacity and higher-speed Bundesstrassen are further categorized into Autobahns and Schnellstrassen (expressways).

Five automobile bridges cross the Danube river within the city. From north to south, they are the Nordbrücke, Floridsdorfer Brücke, Brigittenauer Brücke, Reichsbrücke and Praterbrücke.

=== Autobahns ===
Five national autobahns leave Vienna in the westerly (A1), northwesterly (A22), northerly A5, easterly (A4), and southerly (A2) directions. Similarly to the rail lines, they are commonly referred to after their exit directions (Westautobahn, Südatobahn, Nordautobahn and Ostautobahn). In addition, several spur and branch autobahns circle around the southern and eastern areas of the city. Notably, the A23 Südosttangente connects the Süd Autobahn and Ostautobahn, and is the busiest road in Vienna. The protected Wienerwald forest area in the West and Northwest of the city has been left mostly untouched.

=== Schnellstraßen ===
Schnellstraßen are similar to Autobahns except that they have slight inferiorities such as lower posted speeds and smaller curve radii. Within Vienna one may find the S 1 Wiener Außenring Schnellstraße and S 2 Wiener Nordrand Schnellstraße.

=== Bundesstraßen ===
Similarly to the train lines, Bundesstraßen leave the city in a star-shaped pattern. Some are named after their historical final destinations; for example, Prager Straße to Prague, Linzer Straße to Linz, Triester Straße to Trieste and Brünner Straße to Brno (this last to be supplanted by the aforementioned A 5). Bundesstraßen can be compared to U.S. Highways in the United States, being two-lane in rural areas and multi-lane in urban areas.

=== European Routes ===
Several European Routes pass through Vienna, including E 60, E 49, E 59, E 58 and E 461.

== See also ==
- Economy of Vienna
- History of Vienna
- Tourism in Vienna
- Transport in Austria
- Plug-in electric vehicles in Austria § Vienna
