= Wien Ottakring railway station =

Railway station in Vienna, Austria

Wien Ottakring
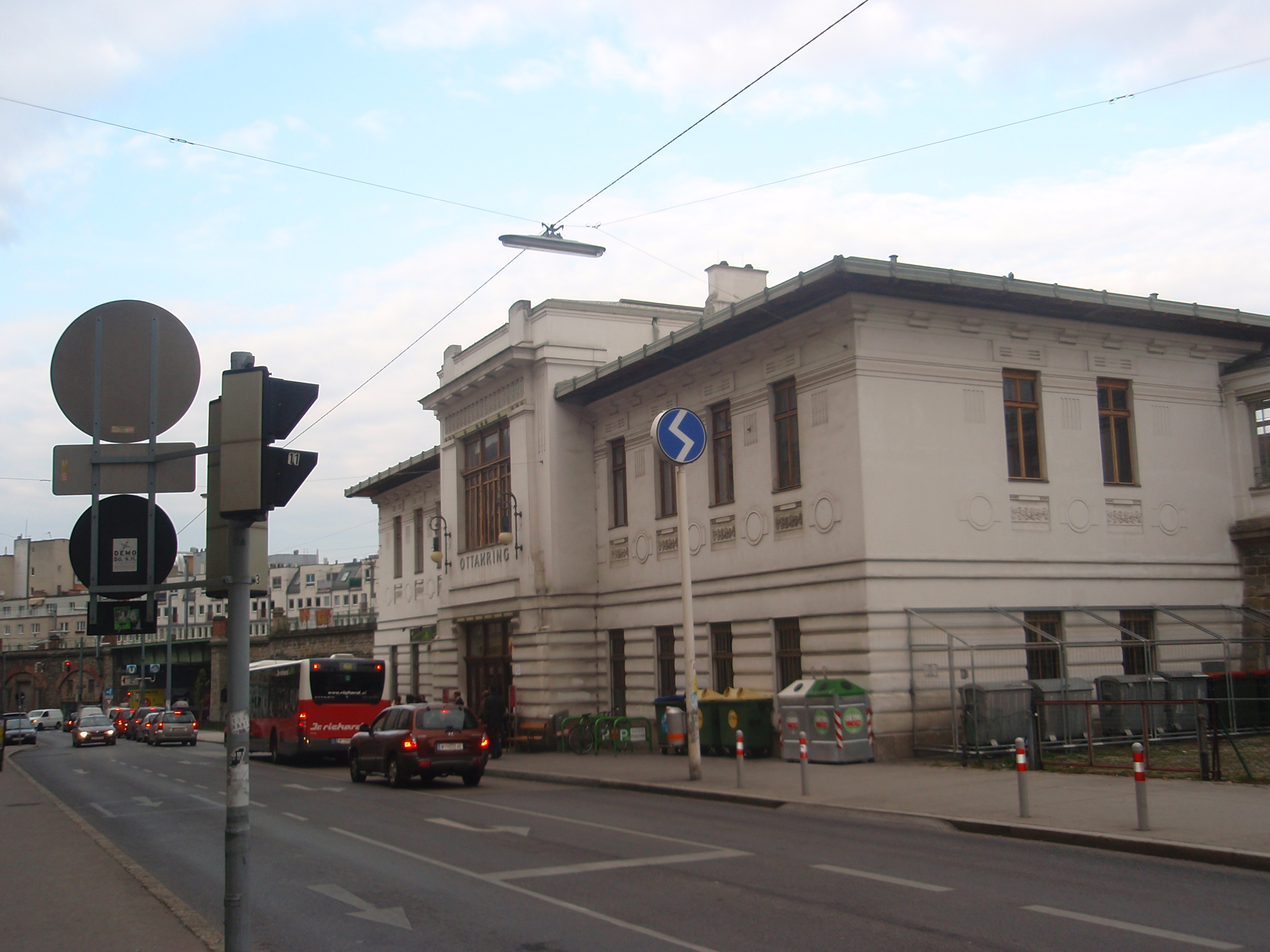
- The Ottakring station building.

General information
- Location: Joachimsthalerplatz 1 A-1160 Wien; Austria
- Coordinates: 48°12′40″N 16°18′40″E
- Owner: Austrian Federal Railways (ÖBB)
- Operator: Austrian Federal Railways (ÖBB)
- Line: Suburban line
- Platforms: 2 side
- Tracks: 2
- Connections: 2A 45B 46A 46B 48A 146B N46

Construction
- Architect: Otto Wagner

History
- Opened: 1898

Services
Preceding station	Vienna S-Bahn	Following station
Wien Breitensee towards Wien Hütteldorf	S45	Wien Hernals towards Wien Handelskai
Location
- Location within Vienna

Wien Ottakring (German for Vienna Ottakring) is a railway station located in the Ottakring district of Vienna, Austria. Opened in 1898, it is owned and operated by the Austrian Federal Railways (ÖBB), and is served by S-Bahn trains.

Beside the station is the Ottakring U-Bahn station, which is the northwestern terminus of U3 of the Vienna U-Bahn.

== See also ==
- Rail transport in Austria
