= Wien Hernals railway station =

Railway station in Vienna, Austria

Wien Hernals
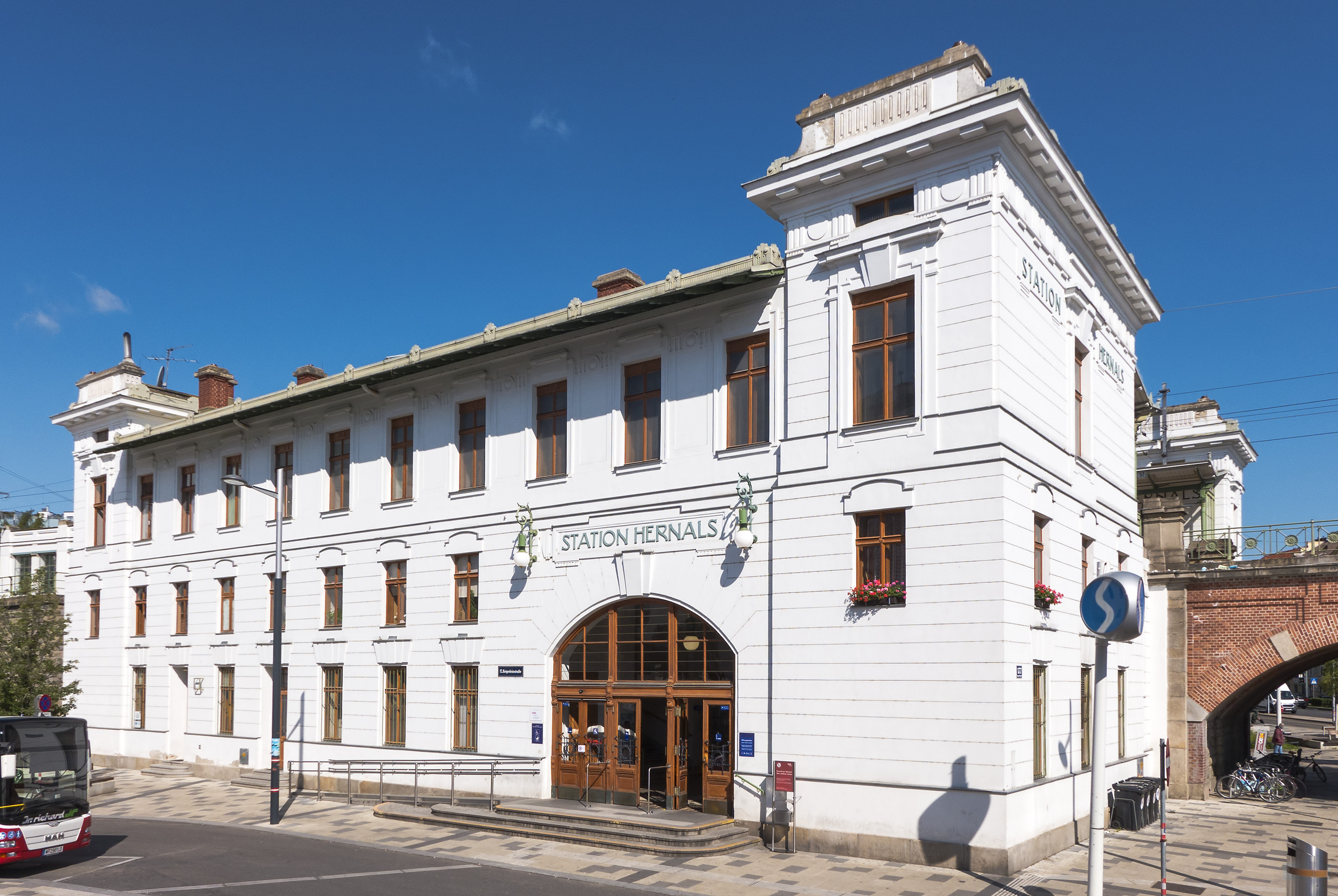

General information
- Location: 1170 Vienna; Austria
- Coordinates: 48°13′23″N 16°18′54″E
- Owner: ÖBB
- Operator: ÖBB
- Line: Suburban line
- Platforms: 2 side
- Tracks: 2

Services
Preceding station	Vienna S-Bahn	Following station
Wien Ottakring towards Wien Hütteldorf	S45	Wien Gersthof towards Wien Handelskai
Location
- Location within Vienna

Wien Hernals is a railway station serving Hernals, the seventeenth district of Vienna, Austria. It was first opened in 1898, and was reactivated in 1987 after extensive restoration efforts. The designer of this railway station is Otto Wagner.
