= Wien Gersthof railway station =

Railway station in Vienna, Austria

Wien Gersthof
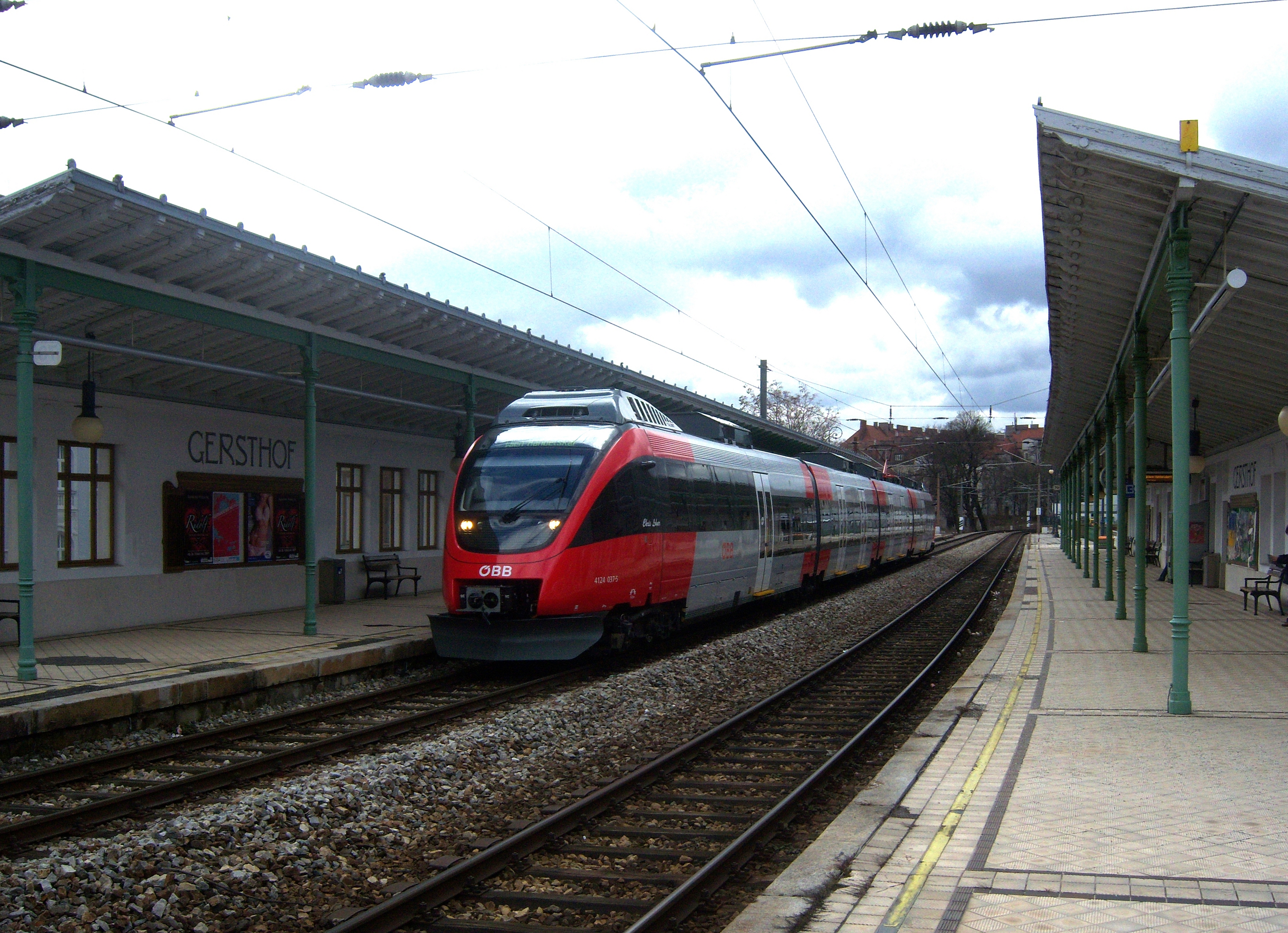

General information
- Location: Gersthofer Straße; 1180 Vienna; Austria
- Coordinates: 48°13′51″N 16°19′44″E
- Owner: ÖBB
- Operator: ÖBB
- Line: Suburban line
- Connections: 9 40 41

Services
Preceding station	Vienna S-Bahn	Following station
Wien Hernals towards Wien Hütteldorf	S45	Wien Krottenbachstraße towards Wien Handelskai
Location
- Location within Vienna

Wien Gersthof is a railway station serving the neighbourhood of Gersthof in Währing, the eighteenth district of Vienna. It is co-sited with the Gersthof stop of the Wiener Linien, which provides interchange to lines 9, 40 and 41 of the Vienna tram network as well as to bus routes 10A and 42A.
