= Wien Krottenbachstraße railway station =

Railway station in Vienna, Austria

Wien Krottenbachstraße
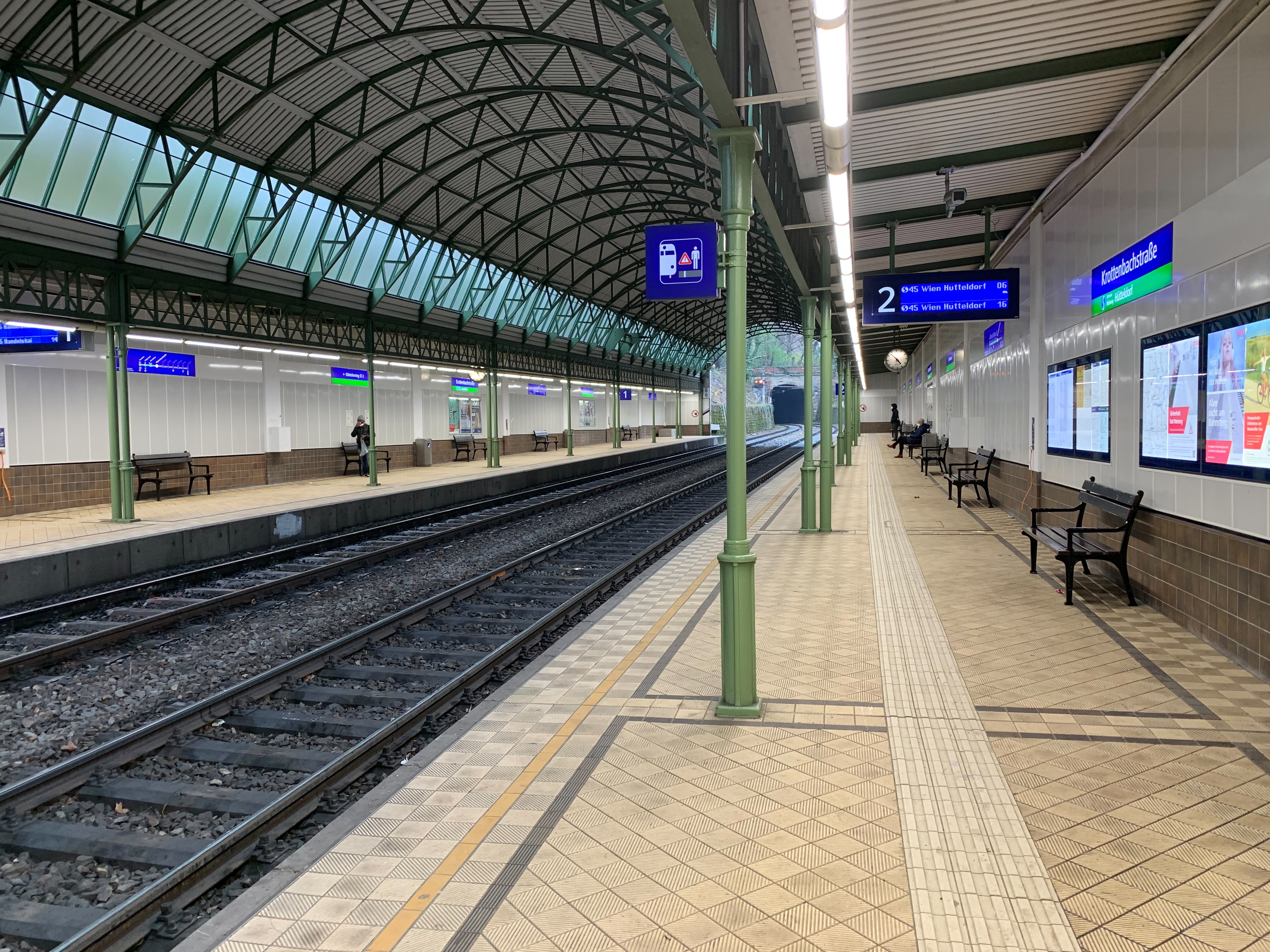

General information
- Location: 1190 Vienna; Austria
- Coordinates: 48°14′24″N 16°20′28″E
- Owner: ÖBB
- Operator: ÖBB
- Line: Suburban line
- Platforms: 2 side
- Tracks: 2

Services
Preceding station	Vienna S-Bahn	Following station
Wien Gersthof towards Wien Hütteldorf	S45	Wien Oberdöbling towards Wien Handelskai
Location
- Location within Vienna

Wien Krottenbachstraße is a railway station serving Döbling, the nineteenth district of Vienna.
