= Wien Breitensee railway station =

Railway station in Vienna, Austria

Wien Breitensee
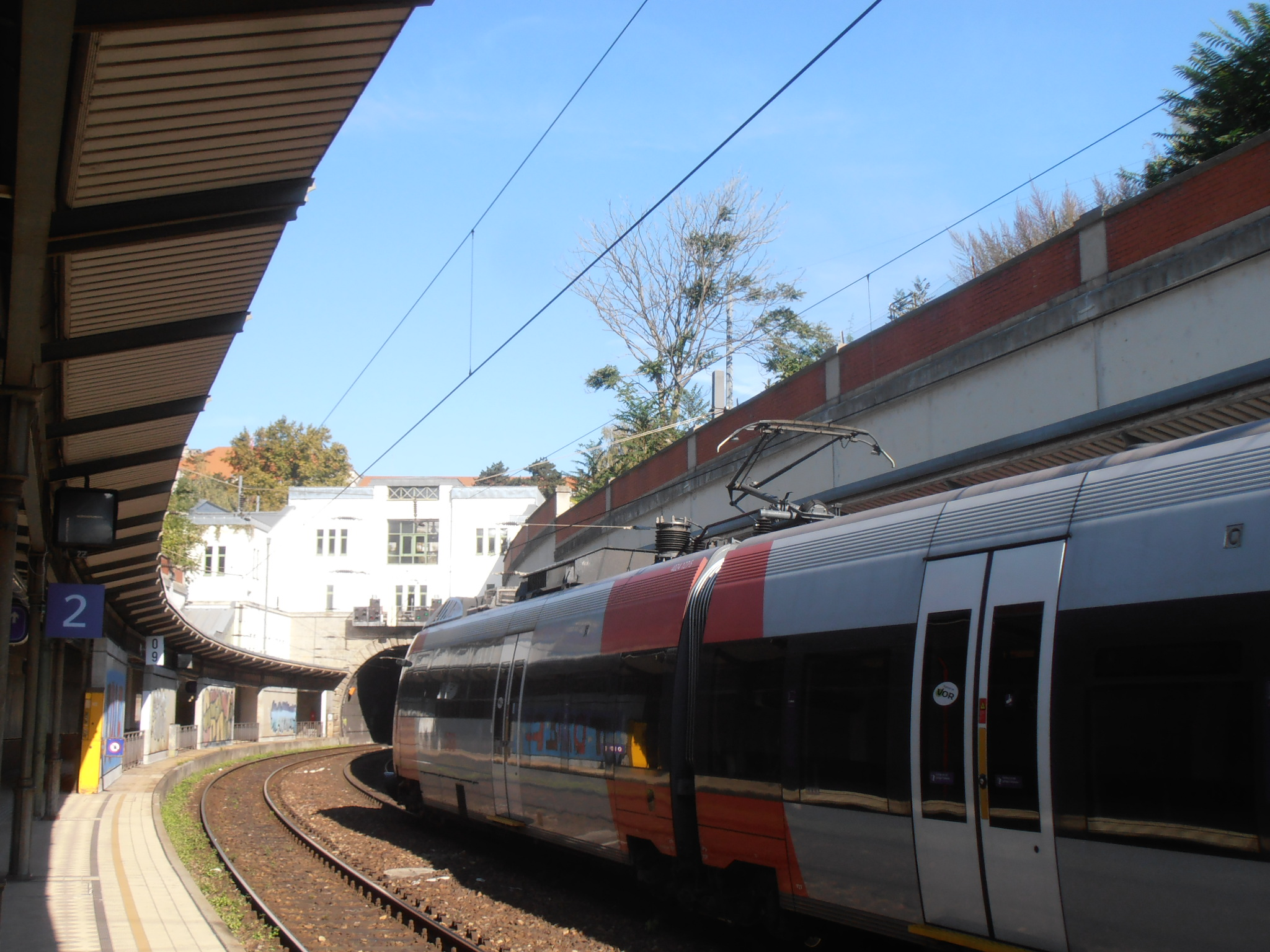

General information
- Location: 1140 Vienna; Austria
- Coordinates: 48°11′54″N 16°18′23″E
- Owner: ÖBB
- Operator: ÖBB
- Line: Suburban line
- Platforms: 2 side
- Tracks: 2

Services
Preceding station	Vienna S-Bahn	Following station
Wien Penzing towards Wien Hütteldorf	S45	Wien Ottakring towards Wien Handelskai
Location
- Location within Vienna

Wien Breitensee is a railway station serving Penzing, the fourteenth district of Vienna.
