= Wien Heiligenstadt railway station =

Railway station in Vienna, Austria

Wien Heiligenstadt
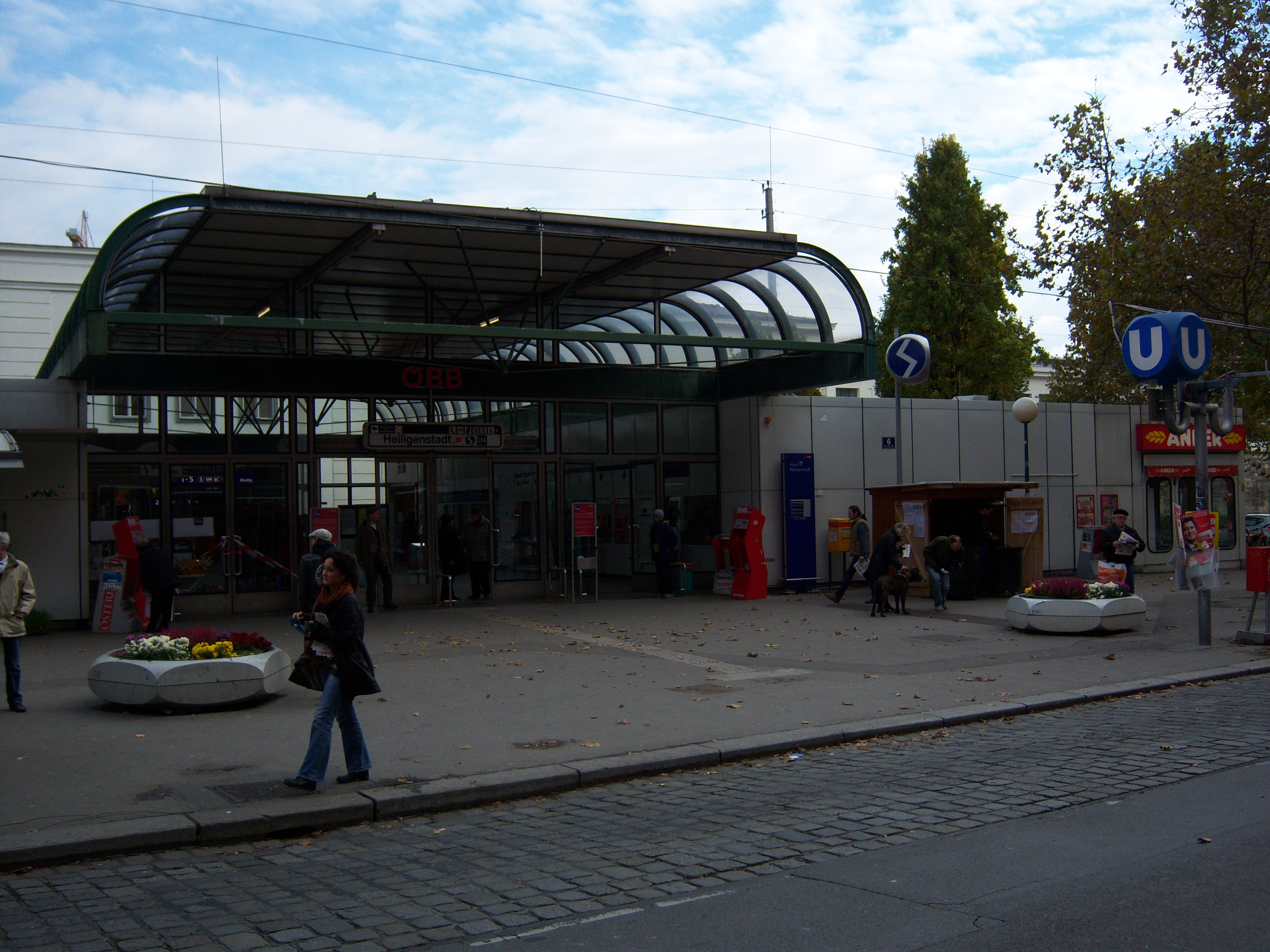

General information
- Location: Boschstraße 8 A-1190 Wien; Austria
- Coordinates: 48°14′57″N 16°21′54″E
- Owner: Austrian Federal Railways (ÖBB)
- Operator: Austrian Federal Railways (ÖBB)
- Lines: Franz-Josefs-Bahn; Suburban line
- Connections: U-Bahn: Bus: 5B, 10A, 11A, 38A, 39A, N36 Regional buses

History
- Opened: 1898

Services
Preceding station	Vienna S-Bahn	Following station
Wien Nußdorf towards St. Pölten Hbf	S40	Wien Spittelau towards Wien FJB
Wien Oberdöbling towards Wien Hütteldorf	S45	Wien Handelskai Terminus
Location
- Location within Vienna

Wien Heiligenstadt (German for Vienna Heiligenstadt) is a railway station located in the Döbling district of Vienna, Austria. Opened in 1898, it is owned and operated by the Austrian Federal Railways (ÖBB), and is served by regional and S-Bahn trains.

Station and adjoining goods depot was bombed on 30 March 1944 by the 15th AF.

Alongside the station is the Heiligenstadt U-Bahn station, which is the northern terminus of U4 of the Vienna U-Bahn.

== See also ==
- Rail transport in Austria
