= Donauuferbahn (Vienna) =

Railway line in Vienna, Austria

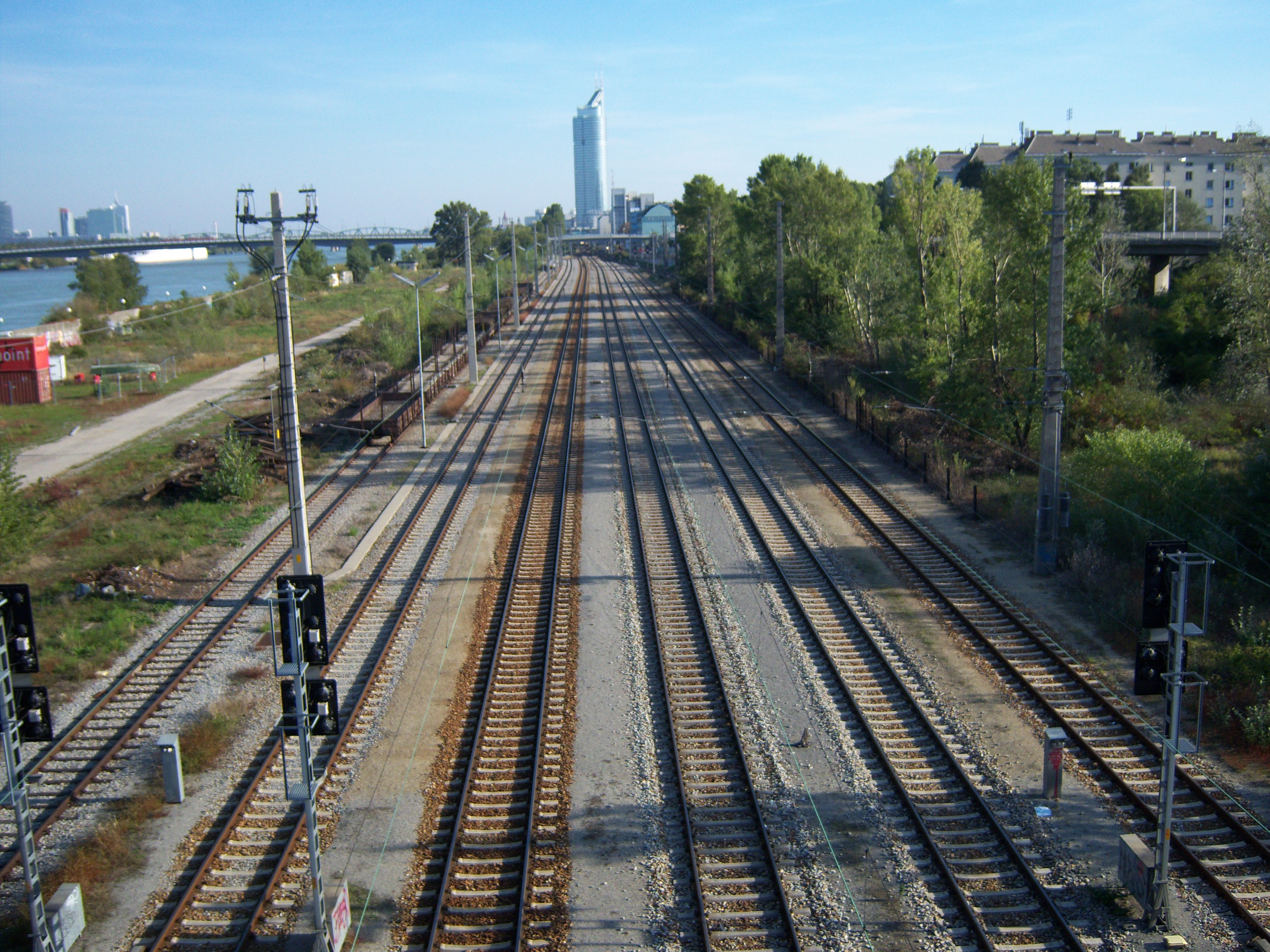
- The Donauuferbahn viewed from the Steinitzsteg in 2008

Service

Technical
- Line length: 12.8 km (8.0 mi)
- Track gauge: 1,435 mm (4 ft 8 1/2 in) standard gauge
- Electrification: 15 kV 16.7 Hz AC

The Donauuferbahn (lit. 'Danube bank railway line') is a railway line in Vienna, Austria. It runs 12.8 kilometres (8.0 mi) along the west bank of the Danube river. At the northern end, the line connects with the Franz-Josefs-Bahn and Suburban line. At the southern end, the line continues as the Donauländebahn near the Winterhafenbrücke. The line is owned and operated by Austrian Federal Railways (ÖBB) and is mostly freight-only.

== Route ==
The northern terminus of the line is at Wien Nussdorf, where it joins the Franz-Josefs-Bahn. The line runs north–south along the west bank of the Danube. South of Wien Nussdorf, the line crosses the Donaukanal and then joins the Suburban line. This section is the only part of the line hosting regular passenger service, the S45 of the Vienna S-Bahn. At Wien Handelskai, the North railway and U6 of the Vienna U-Bahn cross overhead. South of Wien Handelskai, the line is freight-only, with various yards and goods stations. At the southern end, the line continues as the Donauländebahn near the Winterhafenbrücke.

== Operations ==
The only regularly scheduled passenger service on the Donauuferbahn is the S45 of the Vienna S-Bahn, which operates every ten minutes between Wien Hütteldorf and Wien Handelskai.
