= S45 (Vienna) =

Line of the Vienna S-Bahn

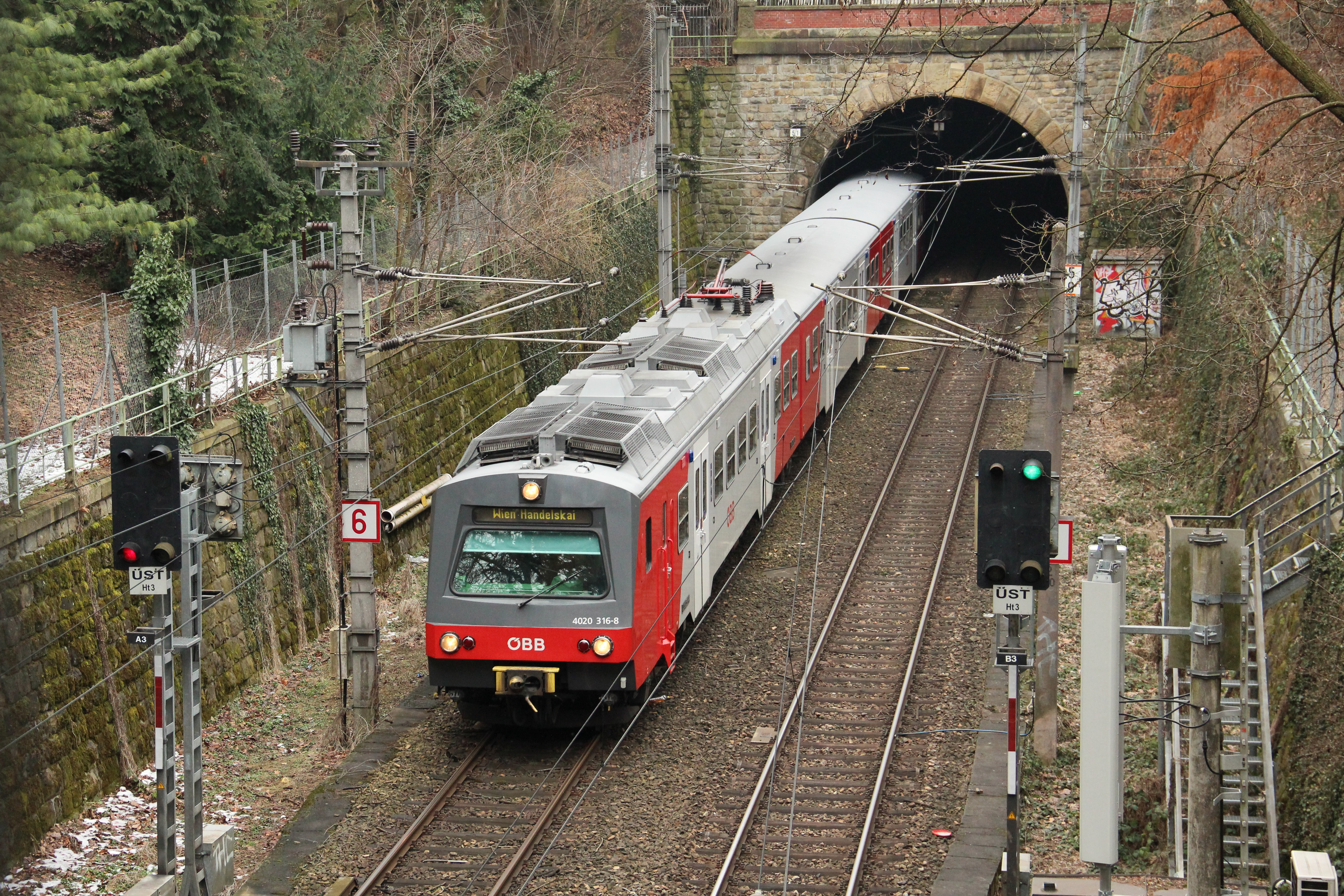
- A Handelskai-bound train at Türkenschanzpark, in 2013

Overview
- Service type: S-Bahn
- Locale: Vienna
- First service: 31 May 1987
- Current operator: ÖBB

Route
- Termini: Wien Hütteldorf; Wien Handelskai
- Stops: 10
- Lines used: Suburban line; Donauuferbahn

Line S45 of the Vienna S-Bahn, also known as the Vorortelinie (lit. Suburban Line) or Wiener Vorortelinie (lit. Vienna Suburban Line), is an electrified commuter rail service operating in Vienna, Austria.

The S45 is the most frequently operated single S-Bahn service, with intervals of 10 minutes during weekdays and 15 minutes during weekends and holidays.

The S45 opened on 31 May 1987. It follows the route of part of the original Stadtbahn and still bears the architecture of the original Stadtbahn. Drivers based in Wien Franz-Josefs-Bahnhof and Wien Westbahnhof operate trains on the route. Unlike the Pink line or the Stammstrecke (trunk line), it is the only line servicing the route. It terminates at Handelskai (on the Stammstrecke) and also crosses the U6 there, the U3 at Ottakring and joins both ends of the U4 at Heiligenstadt and Hütteldorf.

Due to the short platform lengths, only single 4024s (Talent EMUs) and 4020s can operate on the route. The 474X train sets were also tested on the route, but it was found that their extendable door step took too long for them to be able to maintain good time on the route.

The maximum speed of the route is 100 km/h (62 mph), between Hütteldorf and Penzing; however, this speed is not always reached due to the way the route is signaled (i.e. due to the limitations of PZB90, which do not apply to all 4020 EMUs, as most of them use the outdated Indusi60).

== History ==
The original route was opened on 11 May 1898 by the Vienna Stadtbahn. Steam powered trains operated between Wien Hütteldorf and Wien Heiligenstadt on a single track line. On 11 July 1932, passenger service was ended and only freight trains used the line.

In 1975 freight service was discontinued and the line was abandoned. In 1979 the City of Vienna, along with the Austrian Federal Railways (Österreichische Bundesbahnen, ÖBB), brought up plans to reactivate the line. In the following years the line was renovated, expanded to two tracks and electrified with 15 kV 16,7 Hz.

In 1984 a final plan of the new route was concluded. Service began on 31 May 1987, nearly 55 years after passenger service was discontinued, between Hütteldorf and Heiligenstadt.

Passenger traffic greatly increased when service was extended past Heiligenstadt to Handelskai in 1996, offering a connection to the Vienna Trunk Line and increased even more when the U3 U-Bahn line was extended to Ottakring.

In 2007 rush hour frequency was increased from 15 minutes to 10 minutes and in December 2012 frequency was increased to 10 minutes on weekdays.

From 15 December 2019, it is one of the routes where frequency have been increased with expected arrival every 10 minutes until 9PM. The move is expected to increase the connectivity within the city.

== Stations ==
Name	Connections
Wien Hütteldorf	Intercity rail: ÖBB, WESTbahn; Vienna S-Bahn: Vienna U-Bahn: Bus: 43B, 47B, 49A, 50A, 50B, 52A, 52B, 53A, N49
Wien Penzing	Vienna S-Bahn: Tram: 52
Wien Breitensee	Tram: 49; Bus: N49
Wien Ottakring	Vienna U-Bahn: Tram: 2 46; Bus: 45A, 46A, 46B, 48A, N46
Wien Hernals	Tram: 43; Bus: 42A, 44A, N43
Wien Gersthof	Tram: 9 40 41; Bus: 10A, N41
Wien Krottenbachstraße	Bus: 35A, N35
Wien Oberdöbling	Tram: 38; Bus: 39A
Wien Heiligenstadt	Intercity rail: ÖBB; Vienna S-Bahn: Vienna U-Bahn: Tram: D; Bus: 5B, 10A, 11A, 38A, 39A
Wien Handelskai	Intercity rail: ÖBB; Vienna S-Bahn: Vienna U-Bahn: Bus: 5A, 11A, 11B, N64
