= Wien Penzing railway station =

Railway station in Vienna, Austria

Wien Penzing
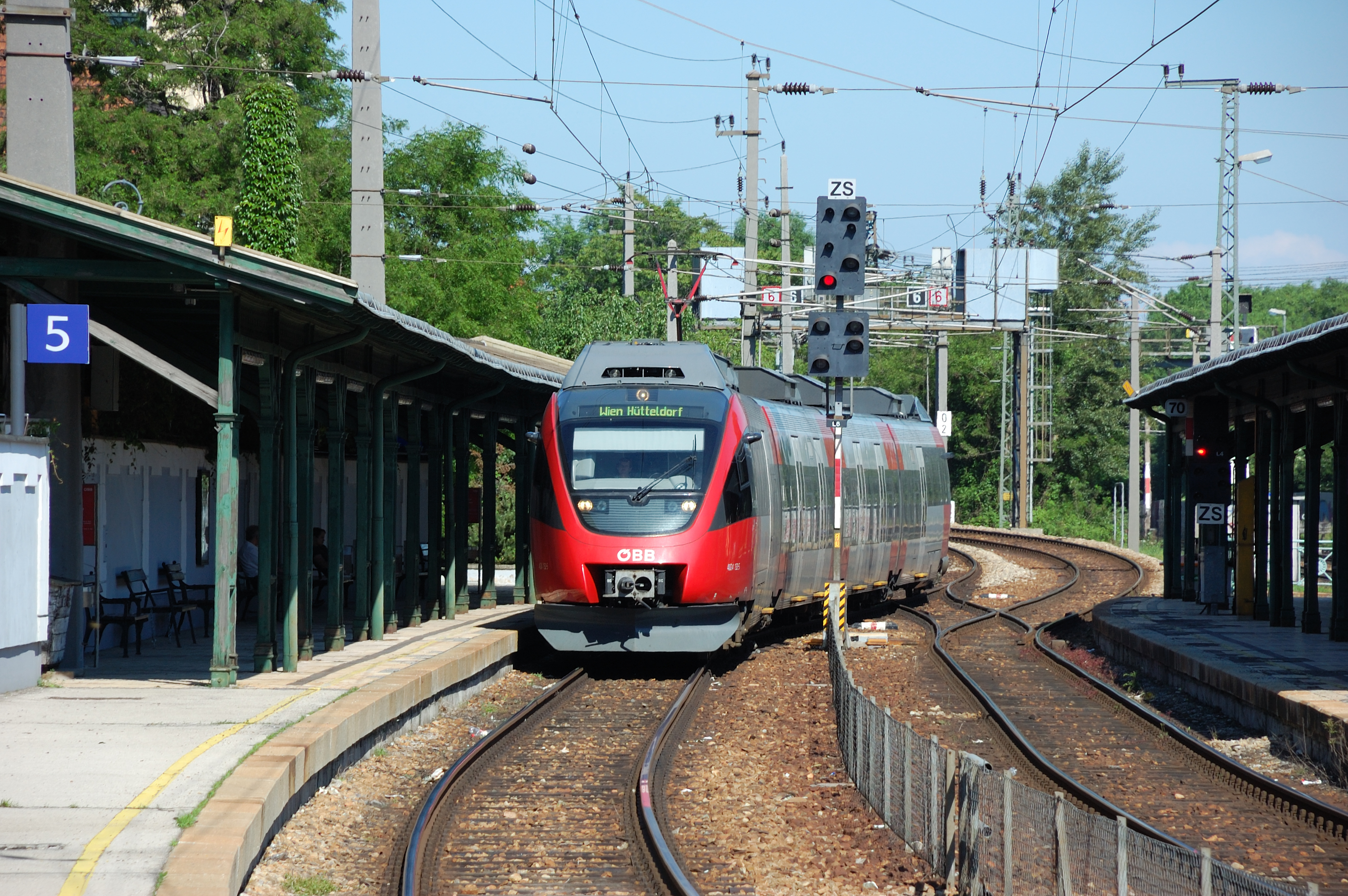
- A Hütteldorf-bound S45 train arriving at Wien Penzing

General information
- Location: Cumberlandstraße 36; 1140 Penzing, Vienna; Austria
- Coordinates: 48°11′33″N 16°18′19″E
- Owner: ÖBB
- Operator: ÖBB
- Lines: Western railway line; Suburban line
- Platforms: 2 side 1 island
- Tracks: 4

Other information
- Station code: PZ
- Fare zone: Core Zone (100)

History
- Opened: 1858
- Electrified: 15 kV 16,7 Hz

Services
Preceding station	Vienna S-Bahn	Following station
Wien Hütteldorf Terminus	S45	Wien Breitensee towards Wien Handelskai
Wien Hütteldorf towards Neulengbach	S50	Wien Westbahnhof Terminus
Location
- Location within Vienna

Wien Penzing is a railway station in Vienna, Austria. It is a stop on two S-Bahn lines, the S45 and S50. The station has three platforms and four tracks. Tracks 1 and 2 are for the S50, while tracks 3 and 4 are for the S45.

Wien Penzing was opened in 1858 for the Empress Elisabeth Railway.

== See also ==
- Rail transport in Austria
