= Franz-Josefs-Bahn =

Railway line in Austria

Technical
- Track gauge: 1,435 mm (4 ft 8 1/2 in) standard gauge
- Electrification: 15 kV 16.7 Hz AC

The Franz-Josefs-Bahn (lit. 'Emperor Franz Joseph railway line') is a standard gauge railway line in the Austrian state of Lower Austria. It runs 163.1 kilometres (101.3 mi) from Vienna, the Austrian capital, to the border with the Czech Republic at Gmünd. The line was originally built by the Emperor Franz Joseph Railway and is today owned and operated by Austrian Federal Railways (ÖBB).

== Route ==
The southern terminus of the line is at Wien Franz-Josefs-Bahnhof, in the Alsergrund district of Vienna. From there, the line follows the west bank of the Donaukanal to Wien Heiligenstadt and a junction with the Suburban line and the Donauuferbahn. From there, the line follows the Danube river, finally crossing it at Tulln an der Donau. At Tulln, it has a junction with the Tullnerfeld railway line. From Tulln, the line runs west-northwest towards Gmünd on the Czech border. At Gmünd, the line crosses the Lužnice river and continues to České Velenice, where it splits into the České Velenice–České Budějovice railway line and České Velenice–Praha railway line.

== Operations ==
The Franz-Josefs-Bahn hosts primarily Vienna S-Bahn and regional traffic. The S40 operates at hourly intervals between Wien Franz-Josefs-Bahnhof and St. Polten, leaving the Franz-Josefs-Bahn at Tulln. Regional trains operate every hour to Eggenburg and every two hours to České Velenice. Direct service between Vienna and Prague over the route, defunct since 1992, resumed in December 2022 as the Silva Nortica (lit. 'Northern Forest'). Regional-Express trains operate hourly to Krems an der Donau, crossing the Danube at Tulln and leaving the Franz-Josefs-Bahn at Absdorf-Hipperdorf.
