= Wien Franz-Josefs-Bahnhof =

Railway station in Vienna, Austria

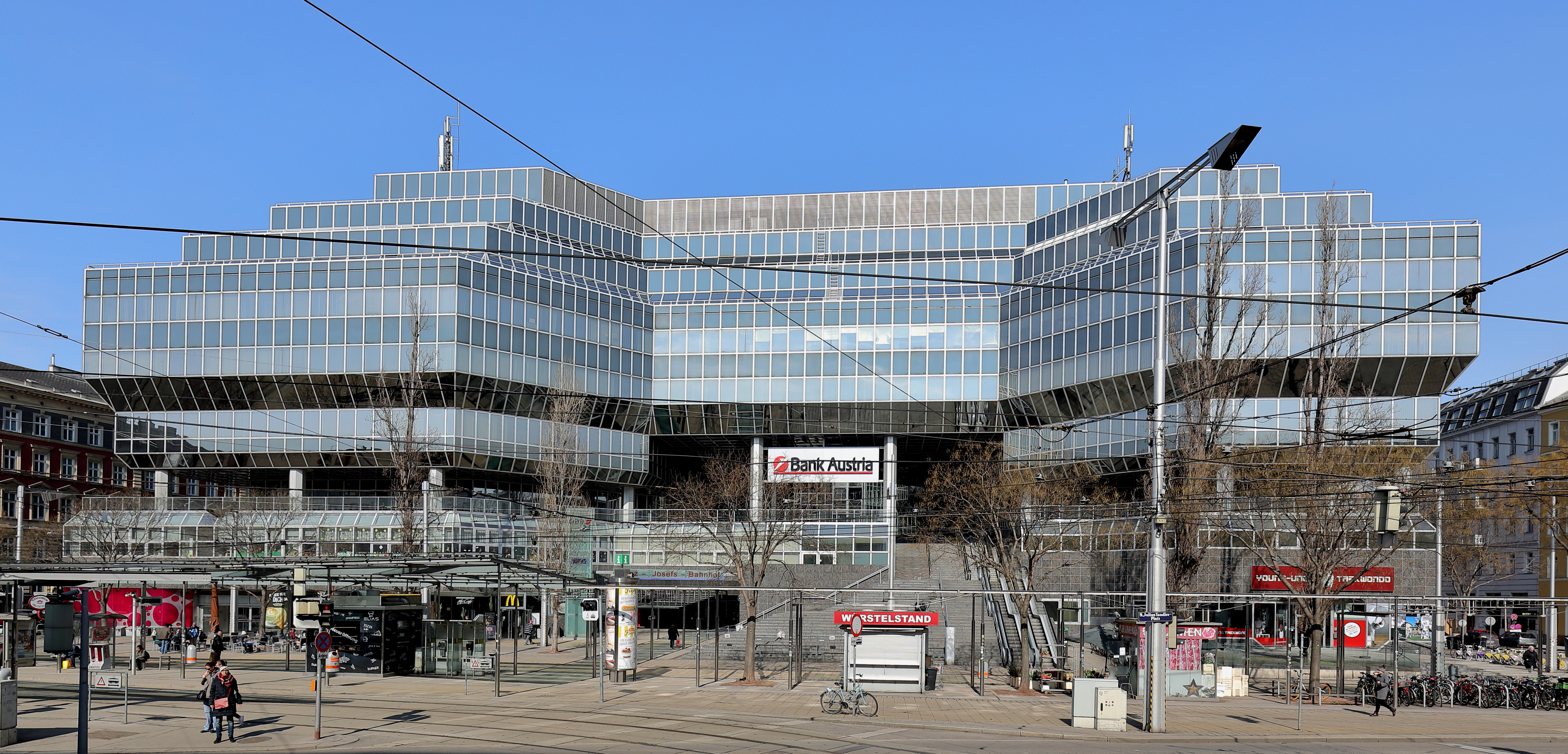
- Facade of the Bank Austria office building

General information
- Location: Vienna-Alsergrund; Austria
- Coordinates: 48°13′34″N 16°21′40″E
- Owner: Austrian Federal Railways (ÖBB)
- Line: Franz-Josefs-Bahn
- Tracks: 5

Construction
- Structure type: at-grade

History
- Opened: 1872
Location

Wien Franz-Josefs-Bahnhof (translated as Vienna Franz Joseph Station, abbreviated as Wien FJB) is a train station in the Alsergrund district of Vienna, Austria. It serves as the southern terminus of the Franz-Josefs-Bahn.

== History ==
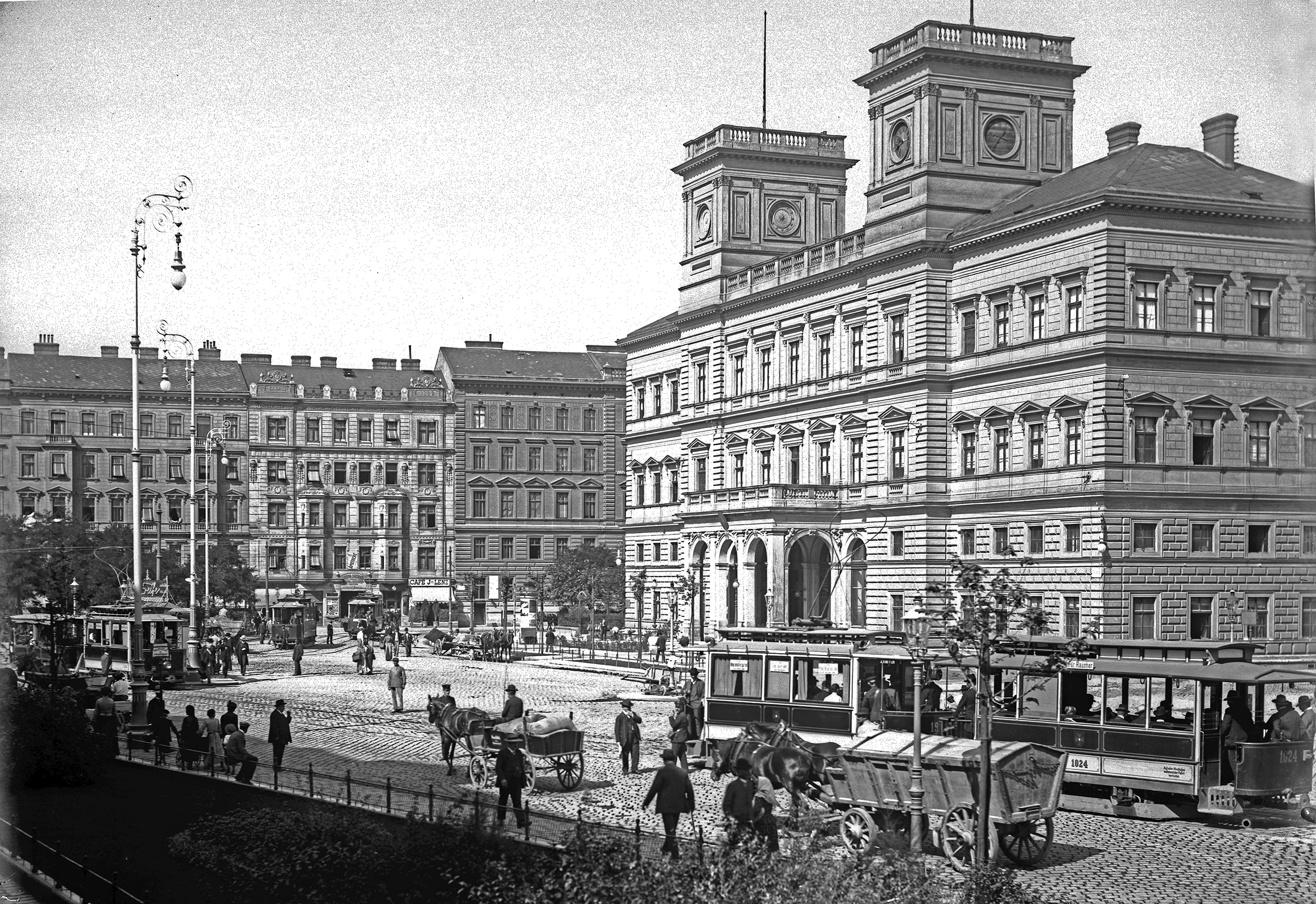
Kaiser-Franz-Josefs-Bahnhof about 1905

A first provisional terminus opened with the inauguration of the first section of the Emperor Franz Joseph Railway from Vienna to Eggenburg in 1870. The Kaiser-Franz-Josefs-Bahnhof, lavishly designed in a historicist Ringstraße style, was built at the present site from 1872 onwards and finished six years later. In 1907 it received access to the Vienna tramway network providing a direct connection to the Westbahnhof, Nordwestbahnhof, Nordbahnhof (Praterstern) railway stations.

When Vienna hosted the 1873 Vienna World's Fair to celebrate Franz Joseph I of Austria, after who the railway station was named, there were four direct trains running between Kaiser-Franz-Josefs-Bahnhof and Prague. The daytime express connected the two cities in nine hours, the overnight train took 18 hours.

During World War II it was damaged by strategic bombing and a blaze in April 1945, nevertheless it was the first of the Vienna main railway stations to resume operations after the war. Re-erected in a simple manner, the reception building served as a backdrop for the 1968 film Mayerling starring Omar Sharif and Catherine Deneuve. The desolate structure was finally demolished in 1974. The new station building, including large-scale office facilities above the tracks, was inaugurated in 1978. The adjacent Althanstraße (UZA) lecture hall complex of the Vienna University was finished in 1995.

== Operational usage ==
Formerly the terminal station of the international Vindobona train from Berlin Ostbahnhof via Dresden and Prague, Franz-Josefs-Bahnhof today serves as a regional train station, used by Regional-Express trains to Krems, Gmünd, Tulln, and to České Velenice in the Czech Republic. It is the terminus of the Vienna S-Bahn line S40 to St. Pölten Hauptbahnhof. Since the 2022/23 timetable, it will also serve as the terminus of international "Silva Nortica" trains from Prague.

The station also hosts a grocery store supplying the local population outside regular shopping hours.
