= Suburban line (Vienna) =

Railway line in Vienna, Austria

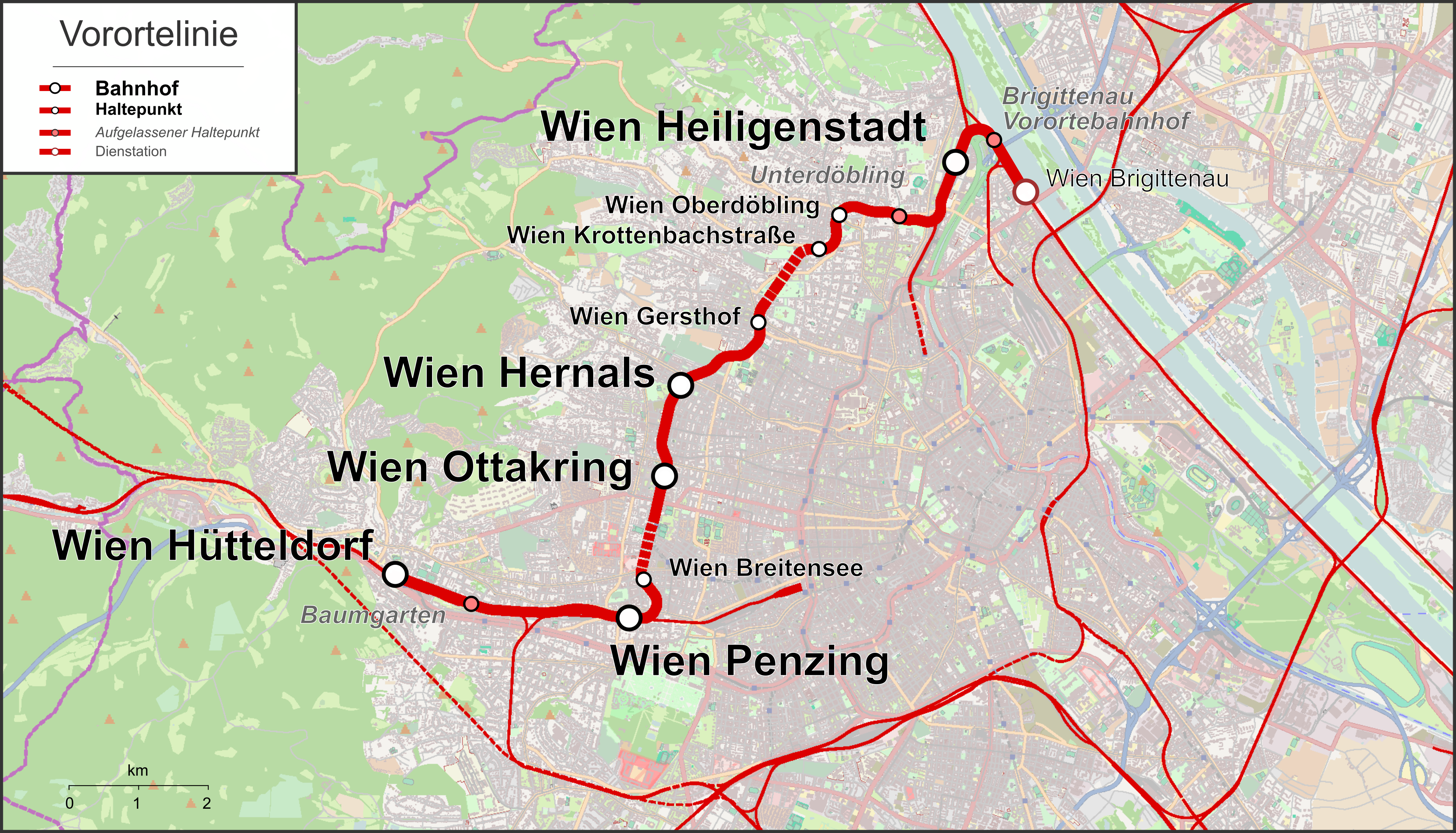
- Route map

Overview
- Native name: Vorortelinie
- Owner: ÖBB
- Locale: Vienna

Service

Technical
- Line length: 14 km (8.7 mi)
- Electrification: 15 kV 16.7 Hz AC

The Suburban line (German: Vorortelinie) is a railway line in the city of Vienna. It runs approximately 14 kilometres (8.7 mi) from Wien Hütteldorf to Wien Heiligenstadt, running around the northwest side of the city. It hosts the S45 service of the Vienna S-Bahn.

== Route ==
The line begins at Wien Hütteldorf, and runs parallel to the Western railway line 2.6 kilometres (1.6 mi) to Wien Penzing. Beyond Wien Penzing, the Western railway line continues east to Wien Westbahnhof, while the Suburban line turns to run northeast, partially in tunnel, to Wien Heiligenstadt. Just before Wien Heiligenstadt, it crosses the tracks of the Franz-Josefs-Bahn, which will continue north to follow the Danube. After leaving Wien Heiligenstadt, the Suburban line crosses the Donaukanal and turns southeast and joins the Donauuferbahn, which also follows the Danube.

== Operations ==
Passenger services on the Suburban line are provided by the S45 of the Vienna S-Bahn, which runs between Wien Hütteldorf and Wien Handelskai on the Donauuferbahn via Wien Heiligenstadt. Trains operate every 10 minutes.
