= Vienna S-Bahn =

Suburban commuter rail network in Vienna, Austria

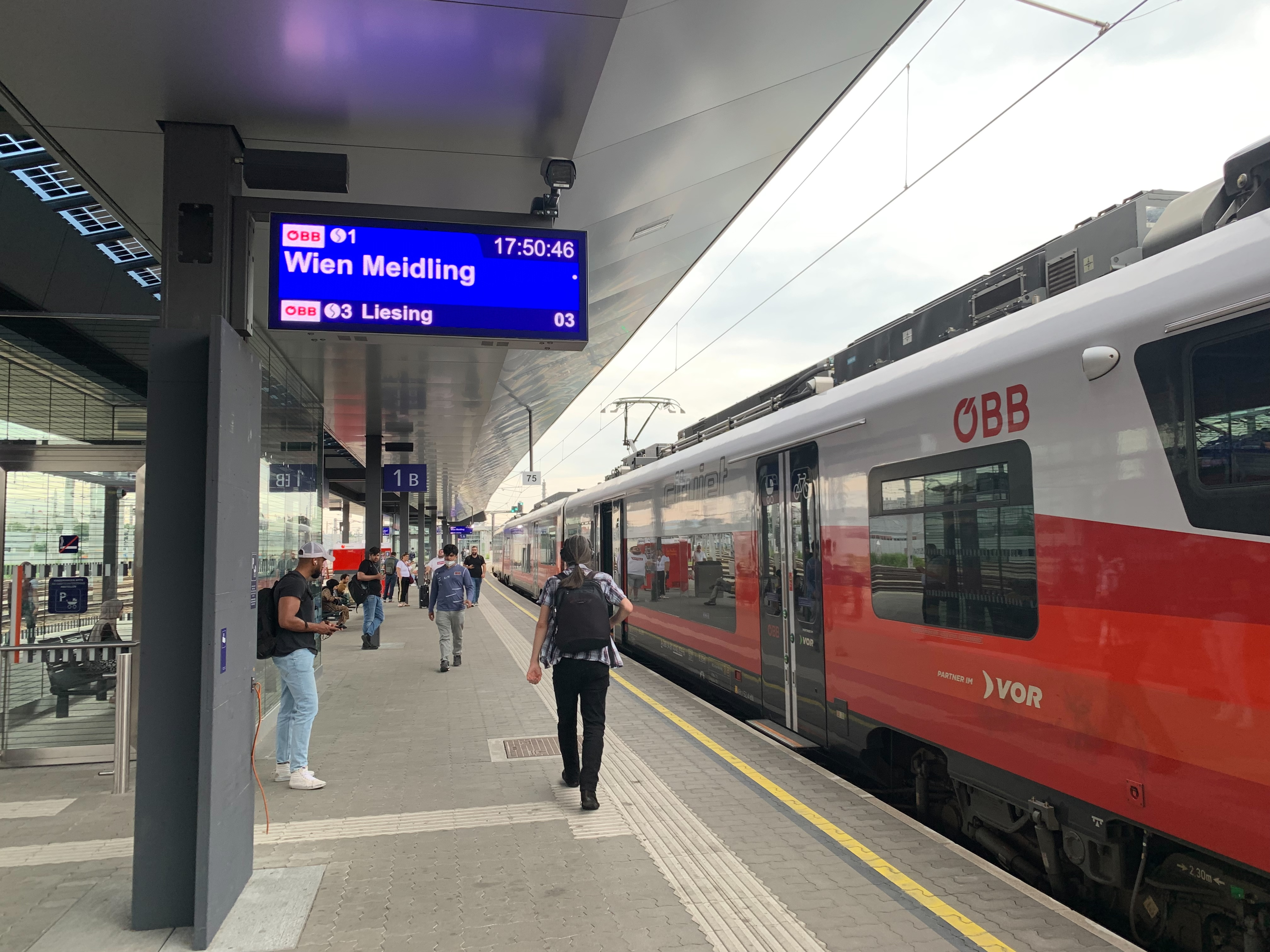
- A 4746 EMU at Wien Matzleinsdorfer Platz

Overview
- Owner: ÖBB
- Locale: Vienna, Austria
- Transit type: S-Bahn
- Number of lines: 10
- Number of stations: 181 (52 of them in Vienna)
- Daily ridership: 300,000
- Headquarters: Vienna
- Website: Vienna S-Bahn

Operation
- Began operation: 17 January 1962
- Operator: ÖBB

Technical
- System length: 650 km (400 mi)
- Track gauge: 1,435 mm (4 ft 8 1/2 in)
- Electrification: 15 kV 16.7 Hz AC Overhead lines
System map
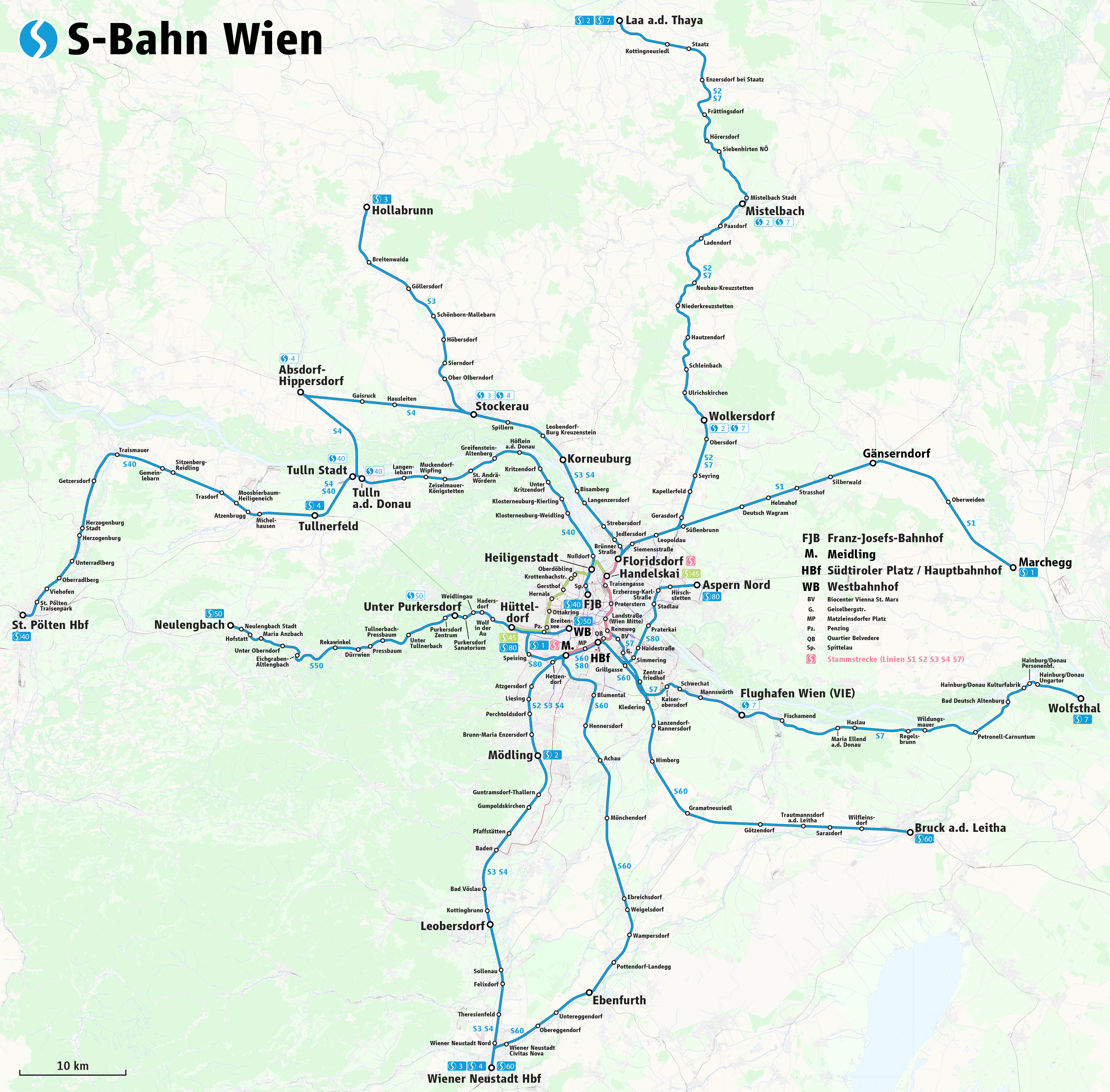
Schematic of the Vienna S-Bahn

The Vienna S-Bahn is an electric suburban commuter rail transit network in Vienna, Austria. As opposed to the city-run urban metro network, the Vienna U-Bahn, it extends beyond the borders of the city, is operated by the ÖBB (Austrian Federal Railways), and consists of many branch lines. S-Bahn is short for Schnellbahn, which can be translated as "rapid railway".

== Network ==
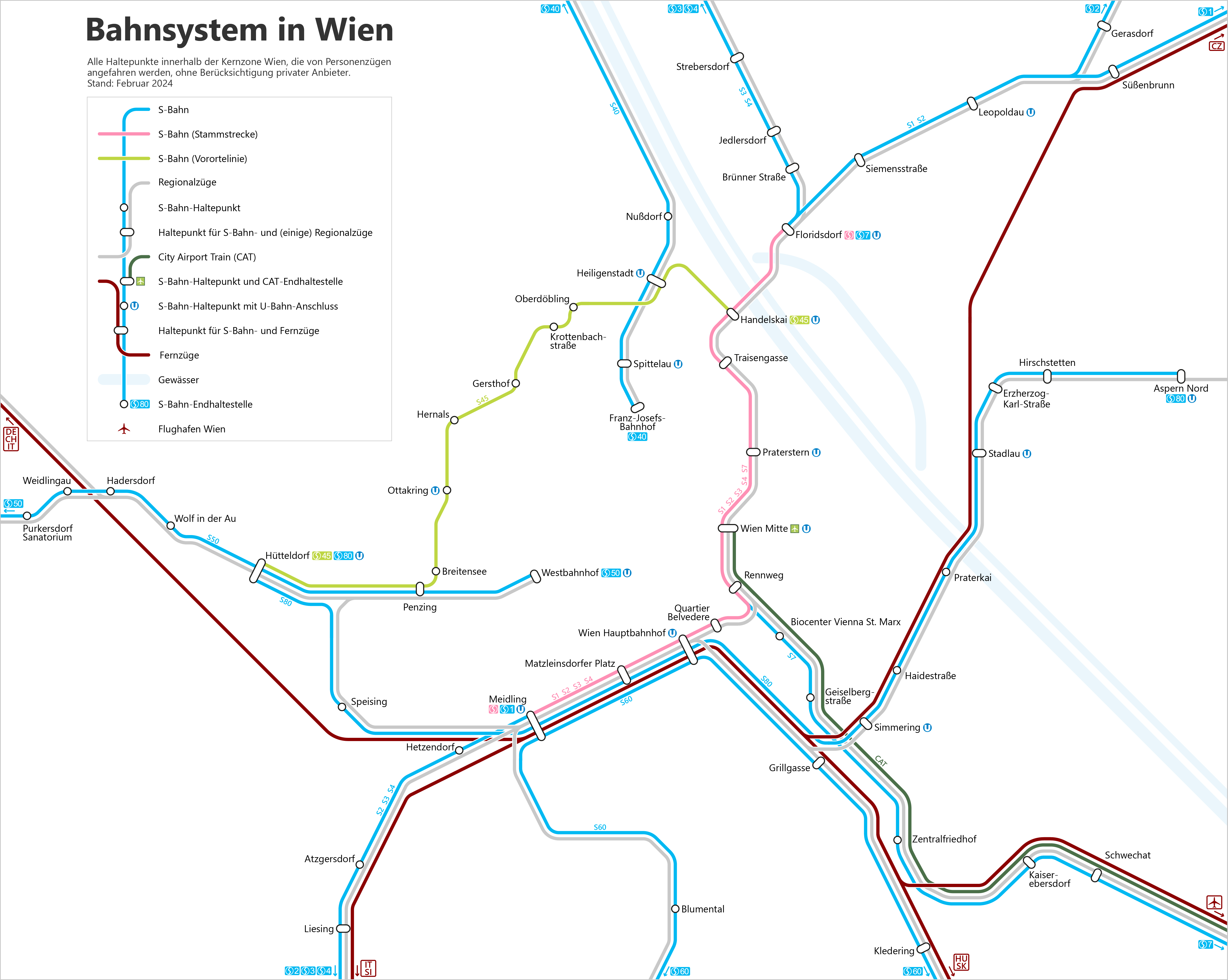
S-Bahn Wien, map of stations within Vienna, valid from 2020

The Vienna S-Bahn consists of a multitude of branch lines extending beyond the city boundary, most of which converge at a central route segment called the Stammstrecke ("trunk line"). While many of the individual lines run at half-hourly or hourly intervals, they are able to offer combined frequencies of only a few minutes or less along the Stammstrecke. Only line S45 operates entirely within Vienna's boundaries.

Unlike many S-Bahn networks in Germany, the Vienna S-Bahn is not a separate rail network. It is integrated with, and part of, the national railway system. As such, S-Bahn trains share tracks with regional trains (which travel further than the S-Bahn, some regional lines crossing into neighbouring countries) and other rail traffic, including freight trains.

The numbering of the lines has changed since the partial opening of the Wien Hauptbahnhof on 9 December 2012.

Train services since 2023
| Line | Route and intervals | Lines used |
|---|---|---|
| S1 (Vienna) | Vienna Meidling – 30′ – Gänserndorf – 60′ – Marchegg | Stammstrecke – Nordbahn – Gänserndorf–Marchegg |
| Vienna S-Bahn | Mödling – 30′ – Vienna Rennweg – 30′ – Vienna Floridsdorf – 30′ – Wolkersdorf – 60′ – Mistelbach (– Laa an der Thaya) | Südbahn – Stammstrecke – Nordbahn – Laaer Ostbahn |
| Vienna S-Bahn | Wiener Neustadt Hbf – 60′ – Leobersdorf – 30′/60′ – Mödling – 30′ – Vienna Floridsdorf – 30′ – Stockerau – 60′ – Hollabrunn | Südbahn – Stammstrecke – Nordbahn – Nordwestbahn |
| Vienna S-Bahn | Wiener Neustadt Hbf – 60′ – Leobersdorf – 30′/60′ – Mödling – 30′ – Vienna Floridsdorf – 30′ – Stockerau – ≈60′/120′ – Absdorf-Hippersdorf (– Tullnerfeld) | Südbahn – Stammstrecke – Nordbahn – Nordwestbahn – Absdorf-Hippersdorf–Stockerau railway (– Franz-Josefs-Bahn – Tullnerfelder Bahn) |
| S7 (Vienna) | Wolfsthal – 60′ – Vienna International Airport – 30′ – Vienna Rennweg – 30′ – Vienna Floridsdorf – 30′/60′ – Wolkersdorf – 60′ – Mistelbach – 60′ – Laa an der Thaya | Pressburger Bahn – Donauländebahn – Aspangbahn – Stammstrecke – Nordbahn – Laaer Ostbahn |
| Vienna S-Bahn | Vienna Franz-Josefs-Bahnhof – 30′ – Tulln Stadt – 60′ – St. Pölten Hbf | Franz-Josefs-Bahn – Tullnerfelder Bahn |
| S45 (Vienna) | Vienna Handelskai – 10′/15′ – Vienna Hütteldorf | Donauuferbahn – Vorortelinie |
| Vienna S-Bahn | Vienna West – 15′ – Unter Purkersdorf – 30′ – Eichgraben-Altlengbach | Westbahn |
| Vienna S-Bahn | Bruck an der Leitha – 30′/60′ – Vienna Central – 60′/120′ – Ebenfurth – 60′/120′ – Wiener Neustadt Central | Ostbahn – Südbahn – Pottendorfer Linie |
| Vienna S-Bahn | Vienna Aspern Nord – 60′ – Vienna Central – 30′/60′ – Vienna Hütteldorf | Marchegger Ostbahn – Laaer Ostbahn – Verbindungsbahn |

All lines, except for S45, have trains that go further and ones that do not run to the terminal.

== History ==
Former S-Bahn logo (1962–2006)

The Wiener Stadtbahn, which belonged to the Commission for Transport Facilities in Vienna and was operated by the Imperial Royal Austrian State Railways, was in its original mode of operation (1898–1925) a forerunner of the S-Bahn, since it was a mainline railway (Vollbahn), which also handled local traffic. However, since other factors, such as military transports, long-distance traffic, etc., played an important role in their planning and the railway was operated with steam locomotives, it was not particularly successful.

As a result, numerous proposals were made to improve the situation, but most of them failed. In all of these pre-WWII proposals, generally no distinction was made between mainline railway and metro, so many proposals under the name "U-Bahn" mostly included mainline railway facilities. The original Stadtbahn plans included more lines than were actually built; said plans remained legally safeguarded until 1951. However, the Stadtbahn, which had been shut down after 1918, was electrified and reopened in 1925 by the Vienna city administration as the Wiener Elektrische Stadtbahn and in a common fare network with the tram; for the rolling stock, turning loops were built in Hütteldorf and Heiligenstadt and at Gumpendorfer Straße station, connecting tracks to the tram network were also built so that the Stadtbahn cars used could also run on the tram. The track connections to the mainline rail network, on the other hand, were shut down or dismantled. The light rail was thus eliminated for an operation that was spreading to the region.

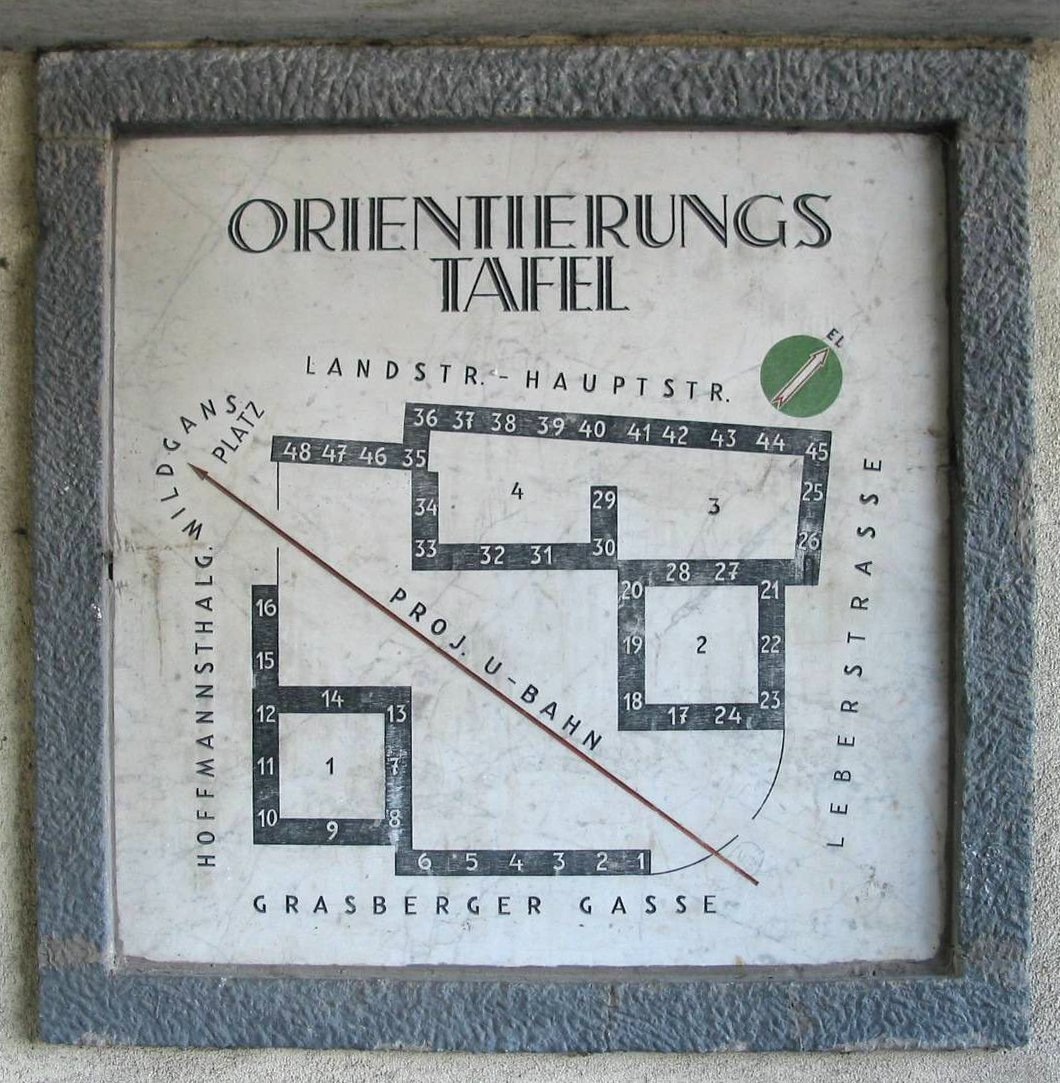
Map of the Wildganshof housing estate, showing a projected (but unbuilt) elevated railway or U-Bahn line in red. (May 2007)

When the Wildganshof Gemeindebau housing estate in the 3rd district was built in 1931–33, it was designed so that an elevated passenger railway line intersecting diagonally between the apartment blocks would have been possible. In the entrance area of the complex there is a board in which this planned route is referred to as a U-Bahn.

After the Anschluss of 1938, the Siemens Bau Union developed a combined U-Bahn and S-Bahn network with municipal offices, the latter intended to be operated by the Deutsche Reichsbahn. Although the planned network was extremely extensive, due to the onset of World War II that plan was not able to go beyond test drilling. In the post-war period, there were new proposals, but these rarely had an official character. A proposal by Otmar Denk from 1947 was very similar to the project that was later realised.

Planning for the mainline S-Bahn network for Vienna was started in 1954 as a part of reconstruction of the ÖBB and especially the Wien Südbahnhof. Concrete plans were completed by 1955, but financing was not secured until 1958. The collapse of the investment budget of the city of Vienna led to a partial stop of construction in 1960, necessitating a postponing of the grand opening of the network by a little over a year.

The S-Bahn era in Austria began on 17 January 1962. Its official opening was attended by over 900 invited guests, including Federal President Adolf Schärf and Vice Chancellor Bruno Pittermann. After a day of testing the network with empty trains, passenger transport began at 11:45pm the following day. Steam locomotives were then prohibited from the section between Meidling and Praterstern. The station Hauptzollamt was renamed "Landstraße" (now Wien Mitte), analogous to the Stadtbahn station.

The S-Bahn was an immediate success. There was severe overcrowding, which could only be eliminated by replacing the single sets with double sets. An agreement was concluded with Wiener Stadtwerke – Verkehrsbetriebe which allowed passengers to use other parallel modes of transport without additional ticket purchase in the event of service disruptions. In 1963, the first television monitors for train handling were installed on a trial basis in the Südbahnhof stop (now Wien Quartier Belvedere). On the Stammstrecke, trains were initially run every quarter of an hour, but already in October 1962 the traffic between Floridsdorf and Landstraße was increased in the rush hour, and from 1964 on the entire Stammstrecke.

Since 3 June 1984, the Vienna S-Bahn has formed part of the integrated fare structure of the Verkehrsverbund Ost-Region (VOR) of Vienna, Lower Austria and Burgenland.

From 1962 until 2005, the term S-Bahn was rarely used, the full term Schnellbahn being preferred. Starting with the 2005/2006 timetable, however, S-Bahn has begun to appear in timetables and loudspeaker announcements. Announcements in Badner Bahn trains still use the term Schnellbahn as of 2009.

== The Stammstrecke ==
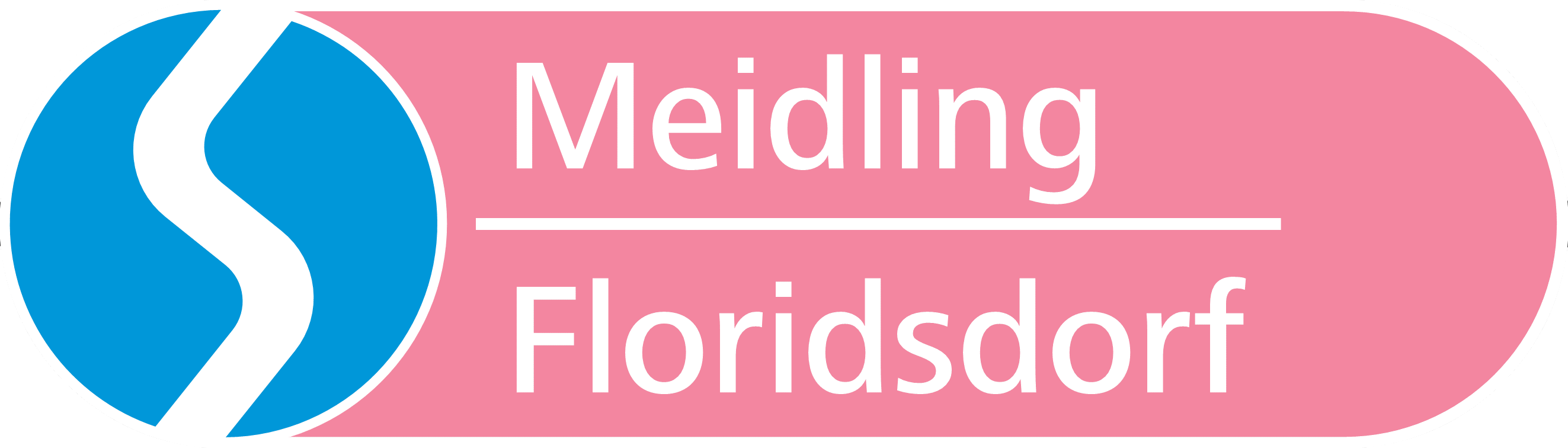

The Stammstrecke, which translates to "Trunk line", of the Vienna S-Bahn has a length of 13.3 km (8.3 mi) with trains running at headways comparable to those of the Vienna U-Bahn. Since 2017, it is shown on maps (including U-Bahn maps) as a dusty pink line. From the south to the north, the following stations are served:

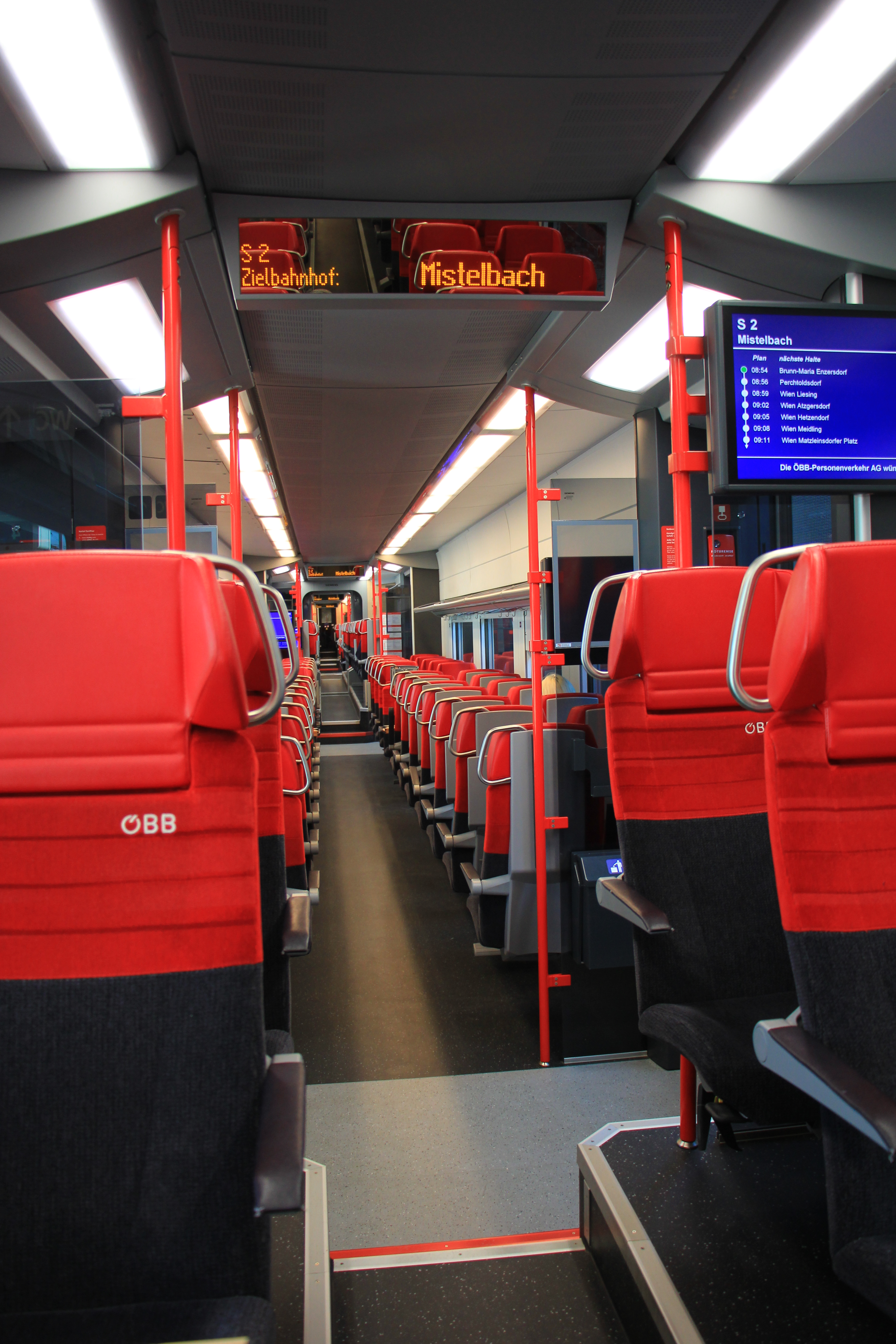
Interior of an S-Bahn train

- Wien Meidling
- Wien Matzleinsdorfer Platz
- Wien Hauptbahnhof (formerly Südtiroler Platz)
- Wien Quartier Belvedere (formerly Wien Südbahnhof tracks 21/22)
- Wien Rennweg
- Wien Mitte (formerly Landstraße)
- Wien Praterstern (formerly Wien Nord)
- Wien Traisengasse
- Wien Handelskai
- Strandbäder (closed 2002)
- Wien Floridsdorf

The Stammstrecke is expected to be extensively modernised, including a signalling upgrade to ETCS Level 2, between 2023 and 2027.

== The Vorortelinie ==
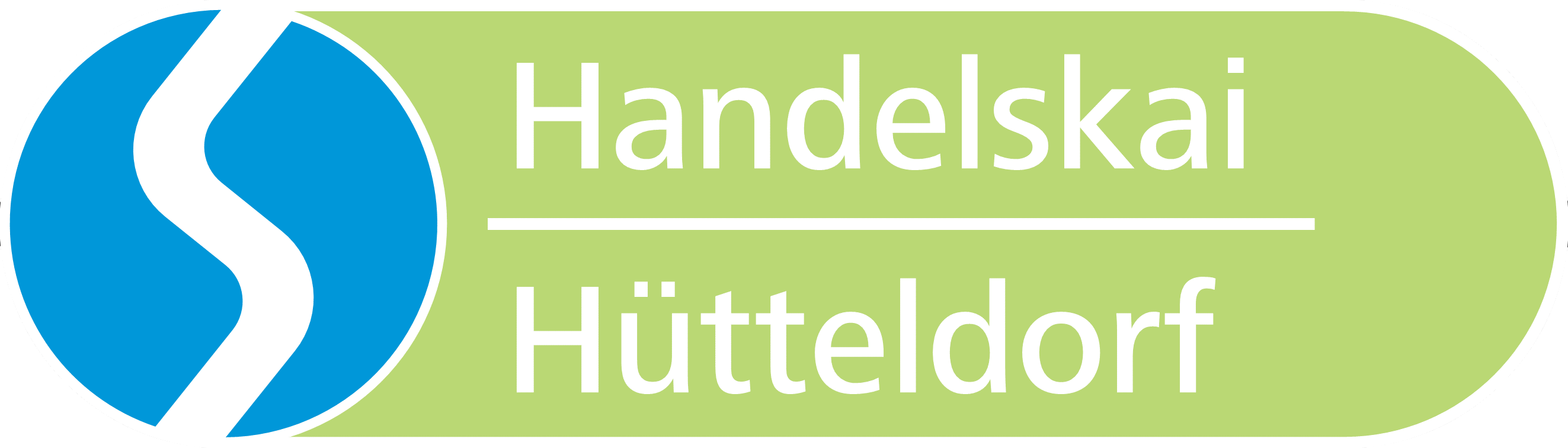

The most highly frequented single line in Vienna is the S45 Vorortelinie, which translates to "Suburban line". The localities along this line all lie within the city proper, although they had been independent until the late nineteenth century, when they were incorporated, six years before this line opened. Originally part of Otto Wagner's federally operated Stadtbahn, this line was not taken over by the city with the rest of the network in 1925. The line was subsequently closed to passengers in 1932. Although still used for freight traffic for several decades afterwards, the line would not see passenger traffic again until 1987, when it was reopened as part of the S-Bahn after extensive renovation.

Many of the original Otto Wagner stations are still standing and still in use. However, two of the present stations, Breitensee and Oberdöbling were demolished after the original line's closure and rebuilt in a different style by architects Alois Machatschek and Wilfried Schermann. One new station, Krottenbachstraße, was added to the refurbished line, and two of the original line's stations, Baumgarten and Unterdöbling, which had also been demolished, were not replaced. Rebuilding Unterdöbling station is proposed for the near future, as is extending the line south to the Reichsbrücke. The line was extended from Heiligenstadt to Handelskai in 1996, to allow for an easy connection to line U6 of the Vienna U-Bahn.

The Vorortelinie runs at headways of 10 minutes (daytime on weekdays), and is shown on maps (including U-Bahn maps) as a light green line.

== Rolling stock ==
=== Current ===
- ÖBB Class 4020 (since 1979)
- ÖBB commuter double deck cars hauled by ÖBB Class 1116 or ÖBB Class 1144 locomotives (since 1996)
- ÖBB Class 4024 (since 2004)
- ÖBB Class 4744/4746 "cityjet" (since 2015)
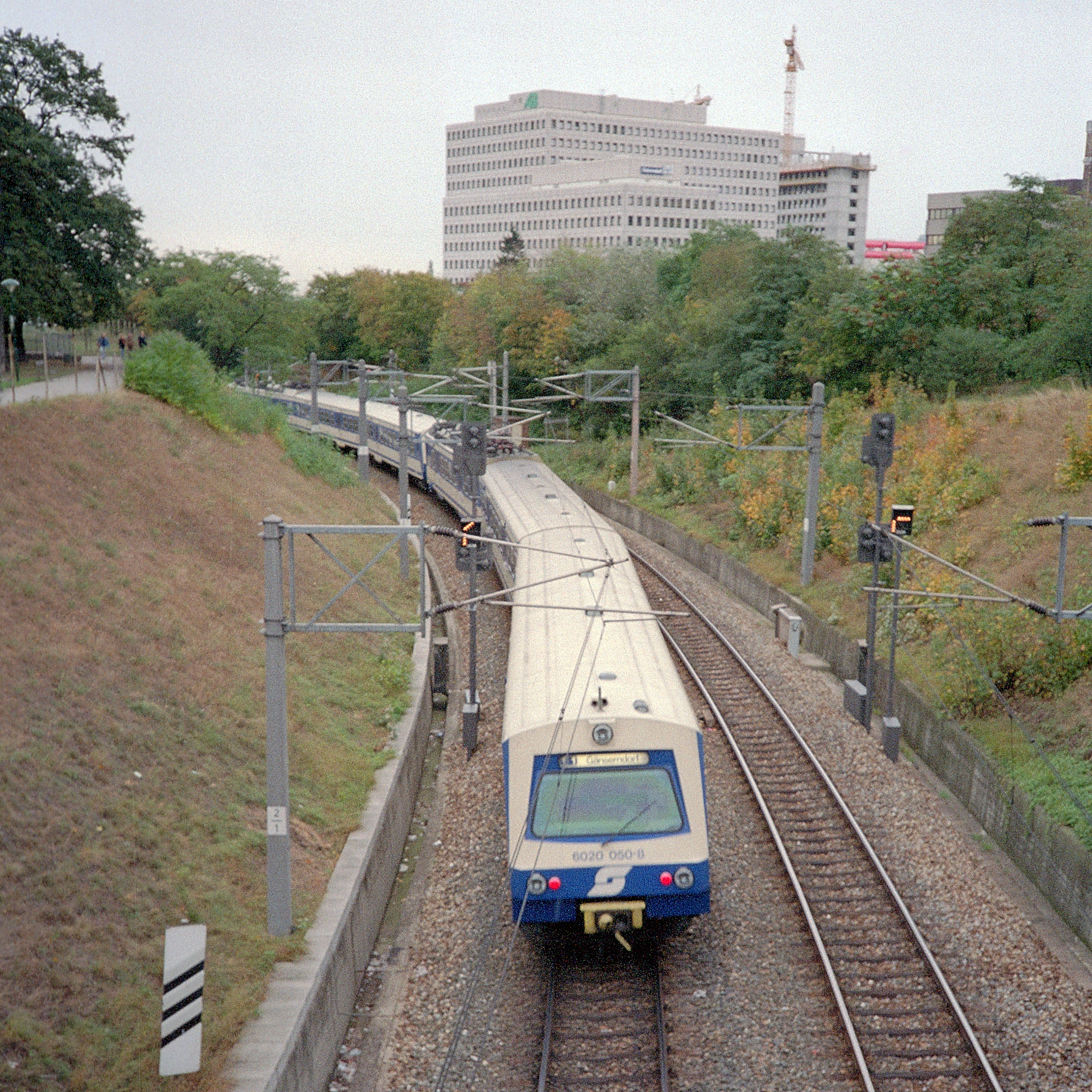
A Class 4020 EMU in original livery between Rennweg and Quartier Belvedere

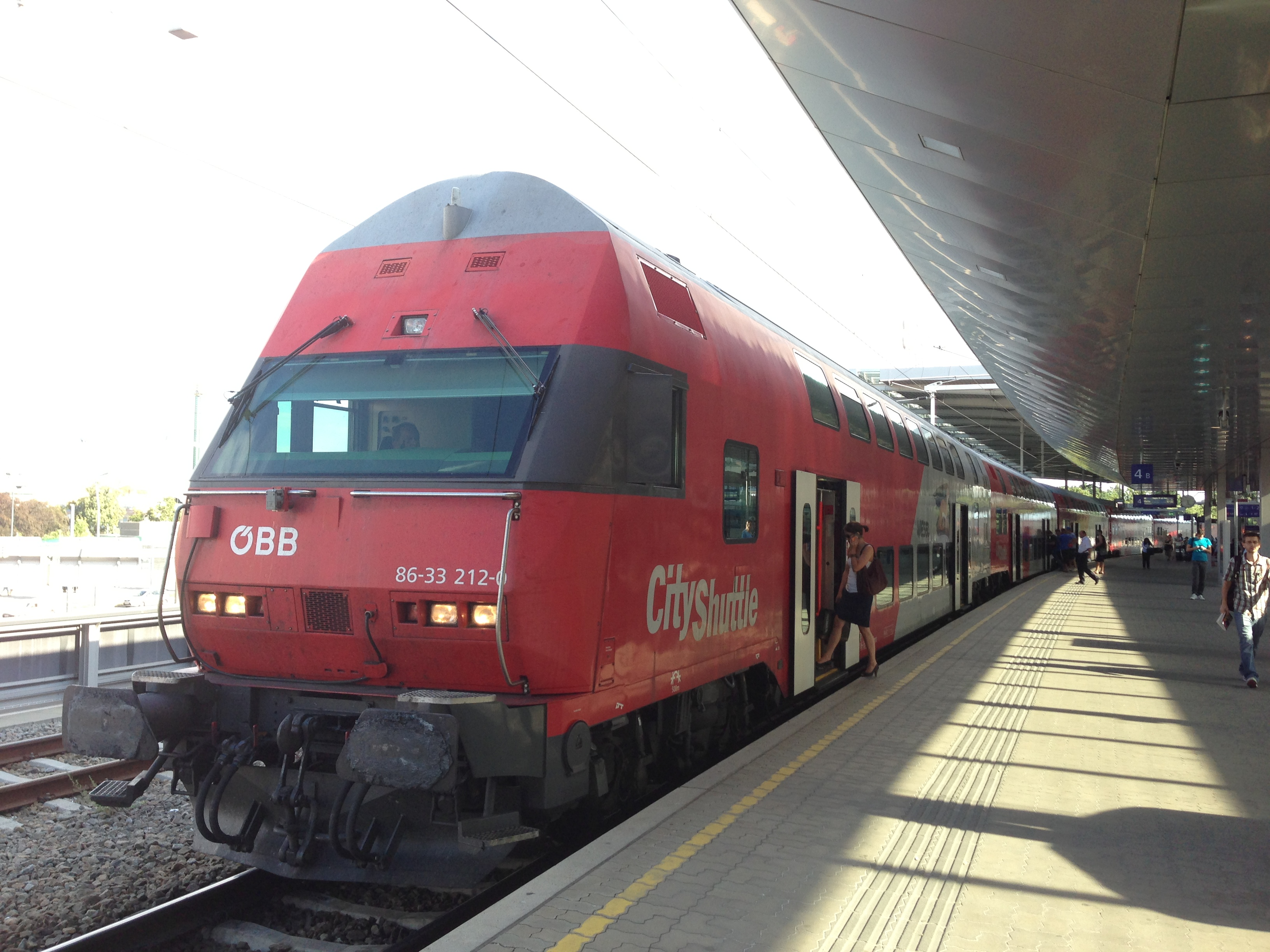
An ÖBB double deck cab car at Wien Praterstern

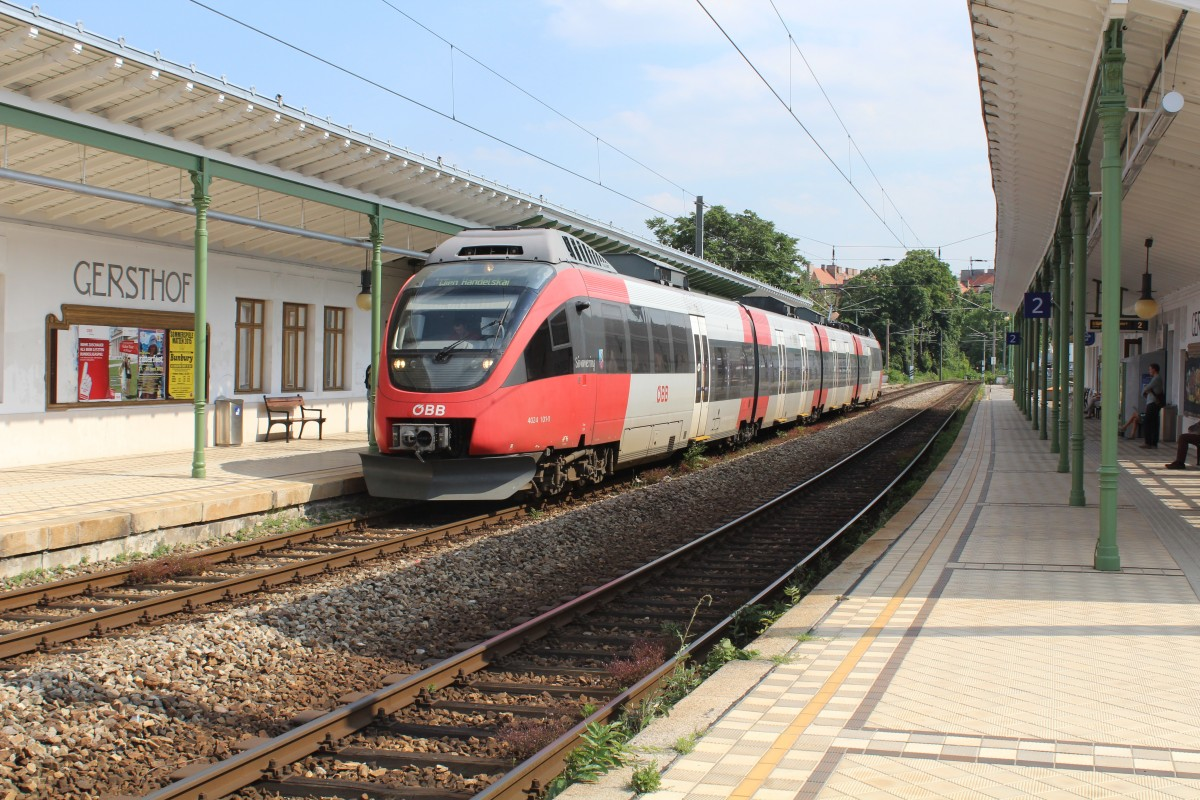
A Class 4024 EMU at Wien Gersthof

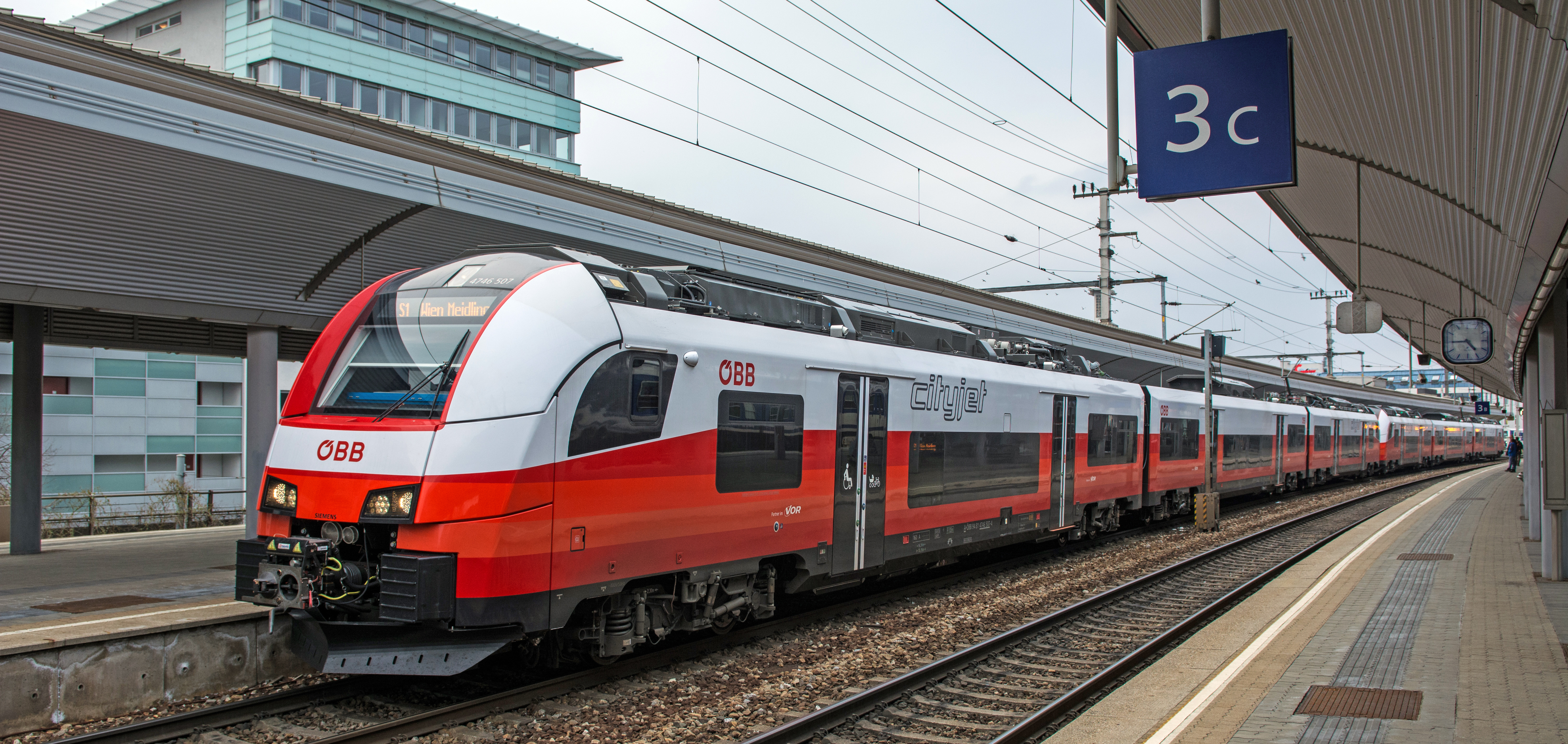
A Class 4746 EMU at Wien Floridsdorf

=== Former ===
- ÖBB Class 4030 (from 1962 until 2004)
- ÖBB Class 5145 (partly as multiple working with Class 4030)
- DB Class 420 (1970 trial)
- SBB-CFF-FFS Re 450 (1992 double-decker train trial)
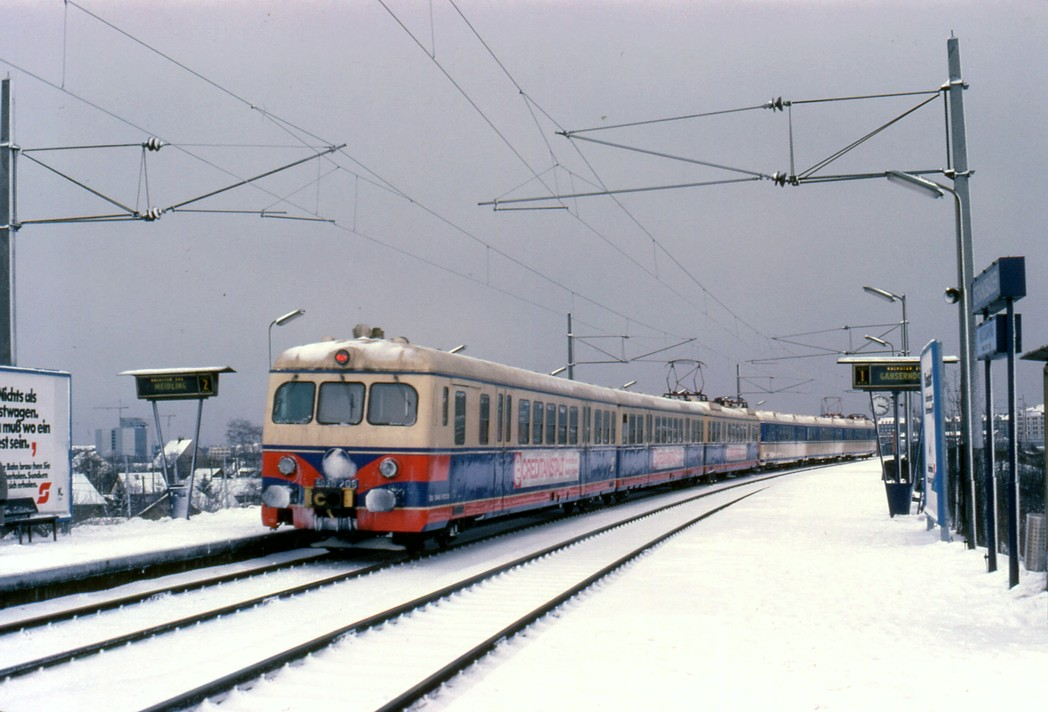
A Class 4030 EMU at Station Strandbäder

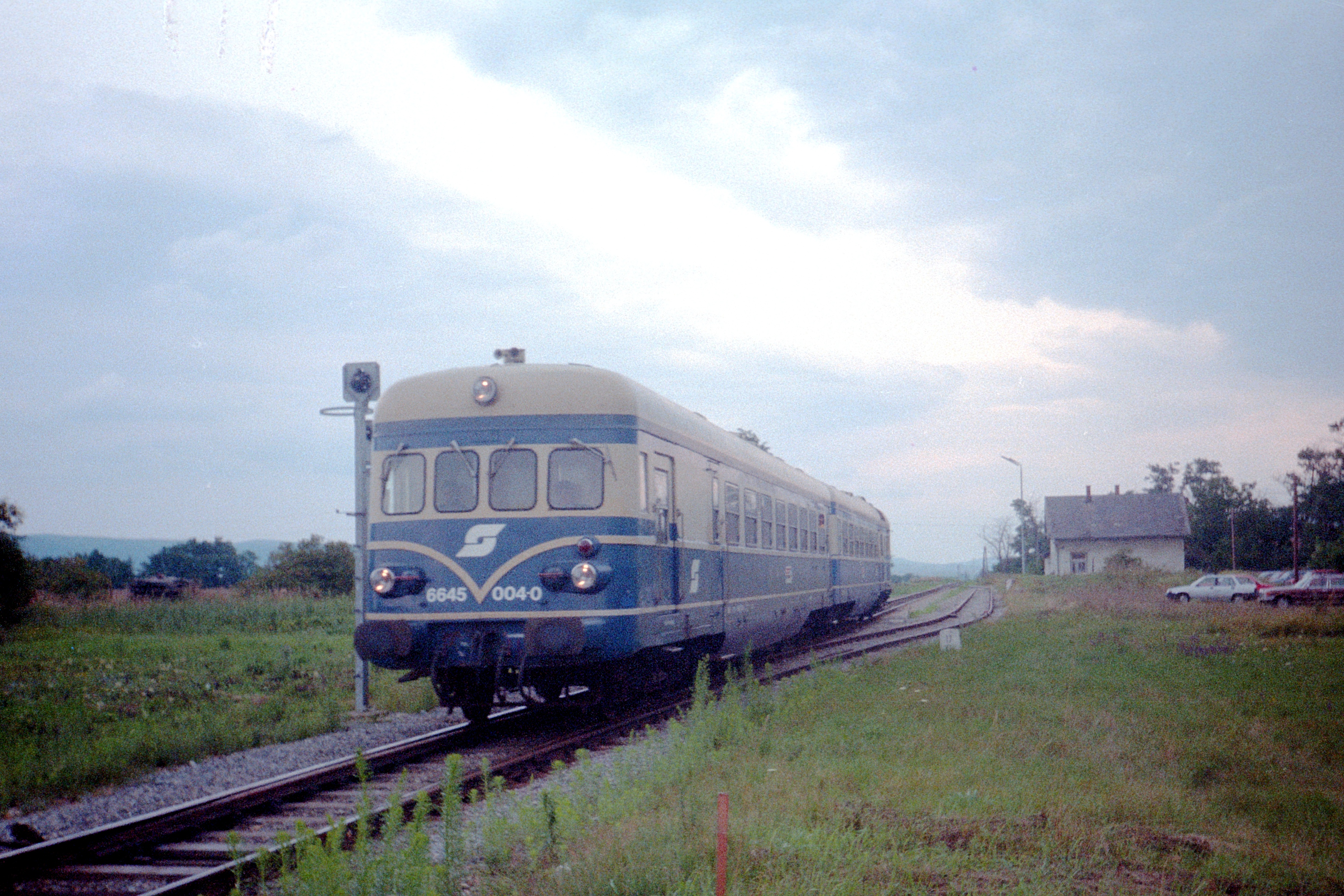
A 5145 DMU with cab car at first at Oggau

== Future plans ==
Demands for the extension of the S7 to the Slovak capital city Bratislava have been made since 1990; the realisation fails because the ÖBB has sold the right-of-way off the Pressburger Bahn from the Wolfsthal terminus to the Slovak border to private individuals.

Furthermore, in December 2014, in the course of the new construction of Wien Hauptbahnhof on the site of the former Südbahnhof, the construction of a connection between the Ostbahn and the airport rapid transit line was completed in order to create an optimal connection to Vienna Airport. The double-track connection was built in the vicinity of the Zentralverschiebebahnhof–Kledering–Zentralfriedhof and has been scheduled since 14 December 2014. According to plans of the ÖBB, the new connection could be run as line S75 from the airport to Vienna Central Station and then on the S-Bahn Stammstrecke from Wien Meidling to Wien Hütteldorf with appropriate financing by the states of Vienna and Lower Austria.

An extension of the suburban line S45 from Handelskai to Donaumarina U2 station along the freight-only Donauuferbahn, with through-running on the current line S80 to form a S-Bahn Ring linking the Laaer Ostbahn at Haidestraße and then connecting to the Stammstrecke at Wien Hauptbahnhof, has been under discussion since 1993.

The Penzing–Meidling Verbindungsbahn, which was noticeably relieved by the Lainz Tunnel, is also to be upgraded between Hütteldorf and Meidling. In addition to a complete renovation and large-scale grade-separation works, the two stations Hietzinger Hauptstraße and Stranzenbergbrücke are to be rebuilt. As of 2020, preparatory work is expected to begin around 2023 and completion is expected in 2026.

== See also ==
- Trams in Vienna
- Vienna U-Bahn
- Wiener Lokalbahnen
- Transportation in Vienna
- Rail transport in Austria
