= Wien Hütteldorf railway station =

Railway station in Vienna, Austria

Wien Hütteldorf
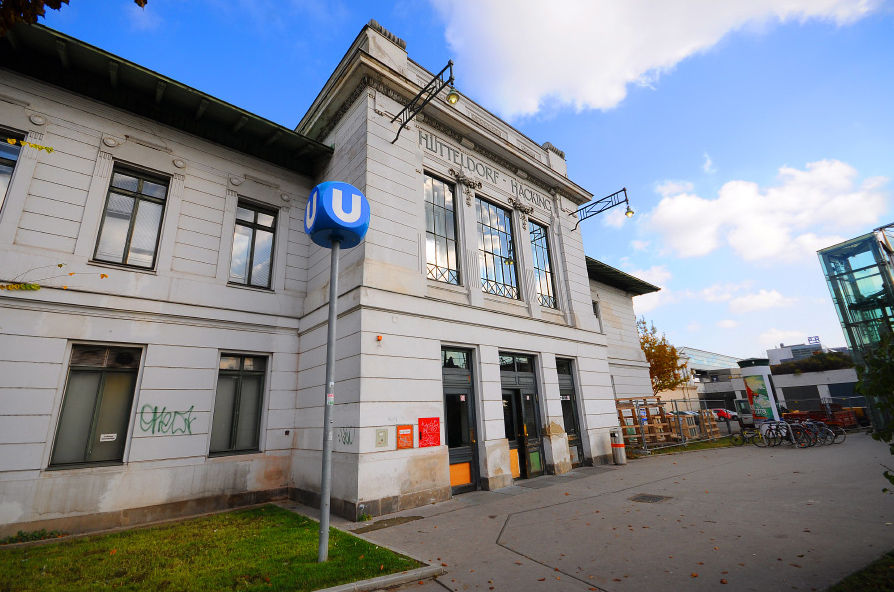

General information
- Location: Keisslergasse 5; 1140 Vienna; Austria
- Coordinates: 48°11′50″N 16°15′40″E
- Owner: Austrian Federal Railways (ÖBB)
- Operator: Austrian Federal Railways (ÖBB)
- Lines: West railway; Verbindungsbahn; Suburban line
- Tracks: 6
- Connections: 43B 47B 49A 49B 50B 52A 52B 53B 150 N49

History
- Opened: 1858

Services
| Preceding station | Vienna S-Bahn | Following station |
|---|---|---|
| Terminus | S45 | Wien Penzing towards Wien Handelskai |
| Wien Wolf in der Au towards Neulengbach | S50 | Wien Penzing towards Wien Westbahnhof |
| Terminus | S80 | Wien Speising towards Wien Aspern Nord |
| Preceding station | | Following station |
| St. Pölten Hbf toward München Hbf | WESTgreen | Wien Westbahnhof Terminus |
Location
- Location within Vienna

Wien Hütteldorf (German for Vienna Hütteldorf) (Hütteldorf-Hacking until 1981) is a railway station located in the Penzing district of Vienna, Austria. Opened in 1858, it is owned and operated by the Austrian Federal Railways (ÖBB), and is served by long distance, regional and S-Bahn trains.

Housed within a train shed at the station is the Hütteldorf U-Bahn station, which is the western terminus of U4 of the Vienna U-Bahn.

== See also ==
- Rail transport in Austria
