= Wien Rennweg railway station =

Railway station in Vienna, Austria

Wien Rennweg
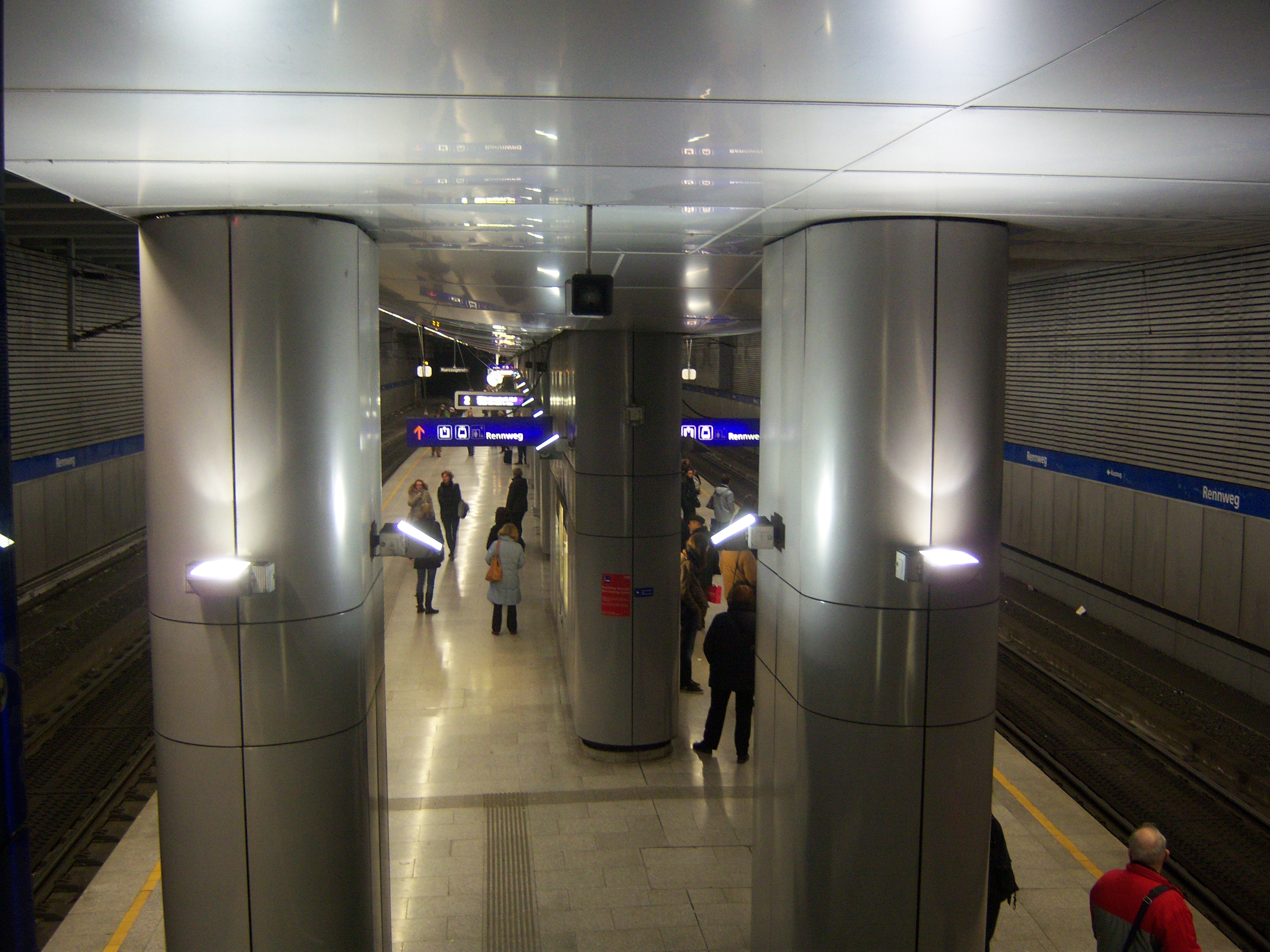

General information
- Location: 1030 Vienna; Austria
- Owner: ÖBB
- Lines: Aspangbahn; Verbindungsbahn
- Platforms: 1 island platform
- Tracks: 2
- Train operators: ÖBB

Services
Preceding station	Vienna S-Bahn	Following station
Wien Quartier Belvedere towards Wien Meidling	S1	Wien Mitte towards Marchegg
Wien Quartier Belvedere towards Mödling	S2	Wien Mitte towards Laa an der Thaya
Wien Quartier Belvedere towards Wiener Neustadt Hbf	S3	Wien Mitte towards Hollabrunn
Wien Quartier Belvedere towards Wiener Neustadt Hbf	S4	Wien Mitte towards Absdorf-Hippersdorf
Wien St. Marx towards Wolfsthal	S7	Wien Mitte towards Laa an der Thaya
Location

Rennweg is a railway station of the Vienna S-Bahn in Landstraße, the city's third district.
