= Verbindungsbahn (Vienna) =

Railway line in Vienna, Austria

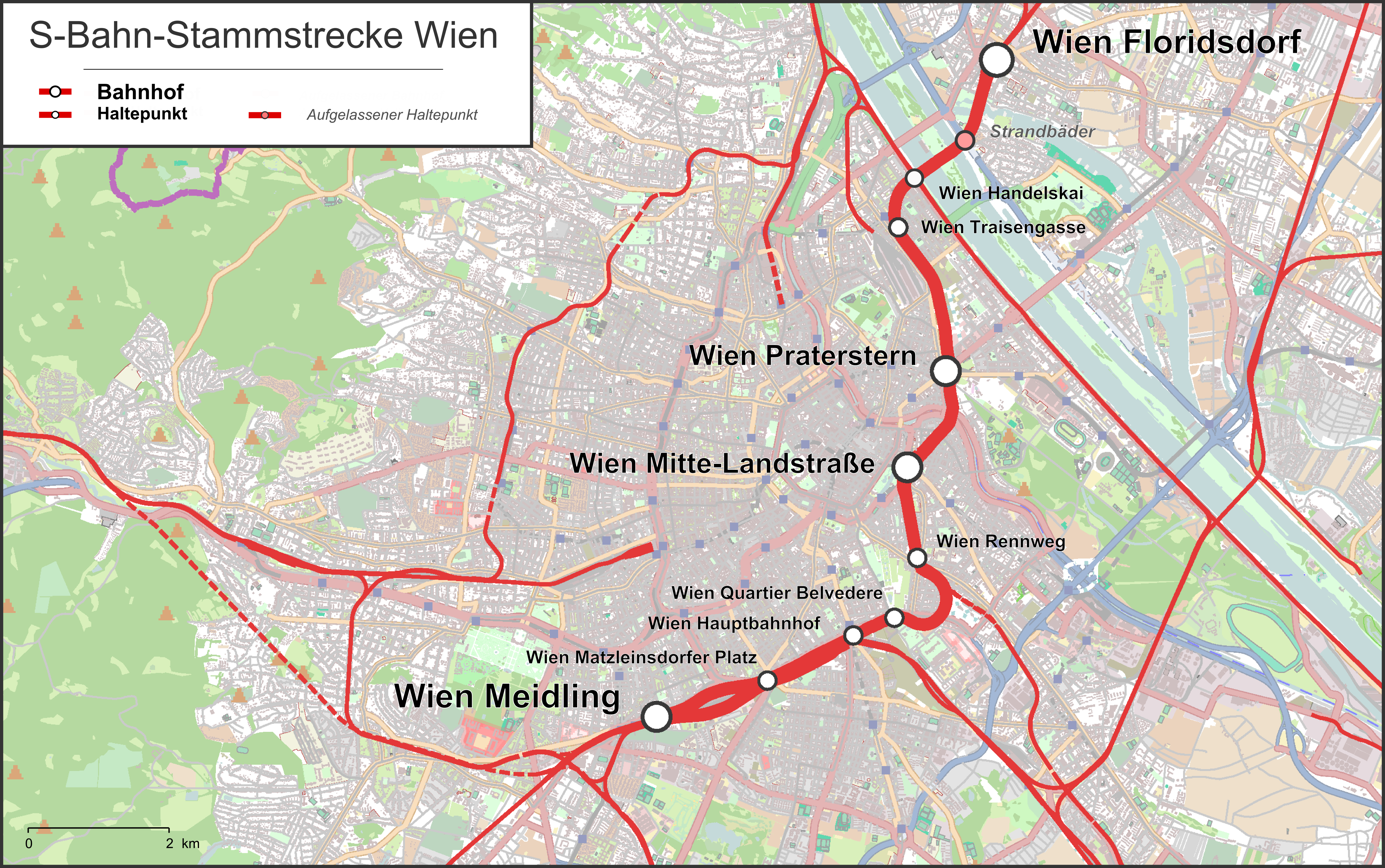
- Map of the S-Bahn Stammstrecke, including Wien Praterstern–Wien Floridsdorf

Overview
- Line number: 122 01
- Termini: Wien Hütteldorf; Wien Praterstern

Technical
- Line length: 16.2 km (10.1 mi)
- Number of tracks: 2
- Track gauge: 1,435 mm (4 ft 8 1/2 in) standard gauge
- Electrification: 15 kV 16.7 Hz AC

The Verbindungsbahn (lit. 'connecting railway line'), also known as the Stammstrecke (lit. 'trunk route'), is a railway line in Vienna, Austria. It runs 16.2 kilometres (10.1 mi) across Vienna, roughly east–west, connecting with most major railway lines in the vicinity of Wien Hauptbahnhof. The section between Wien Praterstern and Wien Meidling, along with part of the North railway line, hosts most Vienna S-Bahn services.

== Route ==
The western end of the Verbindungsbahn is at Wien Hütteldorf, where it connects with the Western Railway and Suburban line. It runs to the south to connect with the Southern Railway and Pottendorfer Linie. Between Wien Meidling and Wien Hauptbahnhof, the line runs parallel to the Southern Railway. It enters the 1,235-metre (4,052 ft)-long Schnellbahntunnel west of Wien Hauptbahnhof; the platforms for that station and Wien Quartier Belvedere are underground. After a section above ground, it enters another tunnel, where it connects with the Aspangbahn. Both Wien Rennweg and Wien Mitte are located in tunnels. North of Wien Mitte the line runs elevated, crosses the Donaukanal, and becomes the North railway line at Wien Praterstern.

== Operation ==
In the Vienna S-Bahn network, the Stammstrecke begins at Wien Meidling, continues through Wien Praterstern, and terminates at Wien Floridsdorf on the North railway line, 4.2 kilometres (2.6 mi) north of Wien Praterstern. Services operating over this route include the S1, S2, S3, S4 and S7.

The eastern end of the line handles Regional-Express, Railjet, EuroCity, EuroNight, and Nightjet services bound for Břeclav, Laa an der Thaya, and points beyond.
