= Wien Südbahnhof =

Railway station in Vienna, Austria

Coordinates: 48.186667°N 16.380000°E

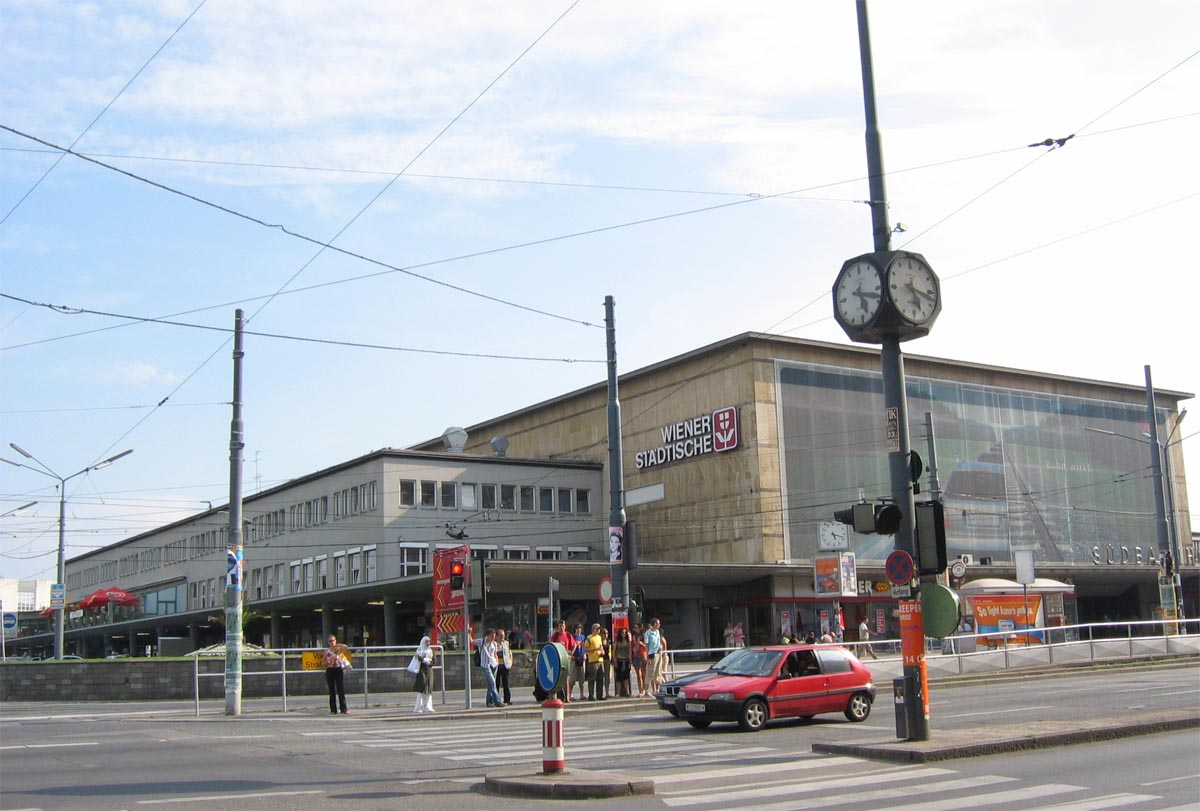
Vienna Südbahnhof seen from the Wiedner Gürtel

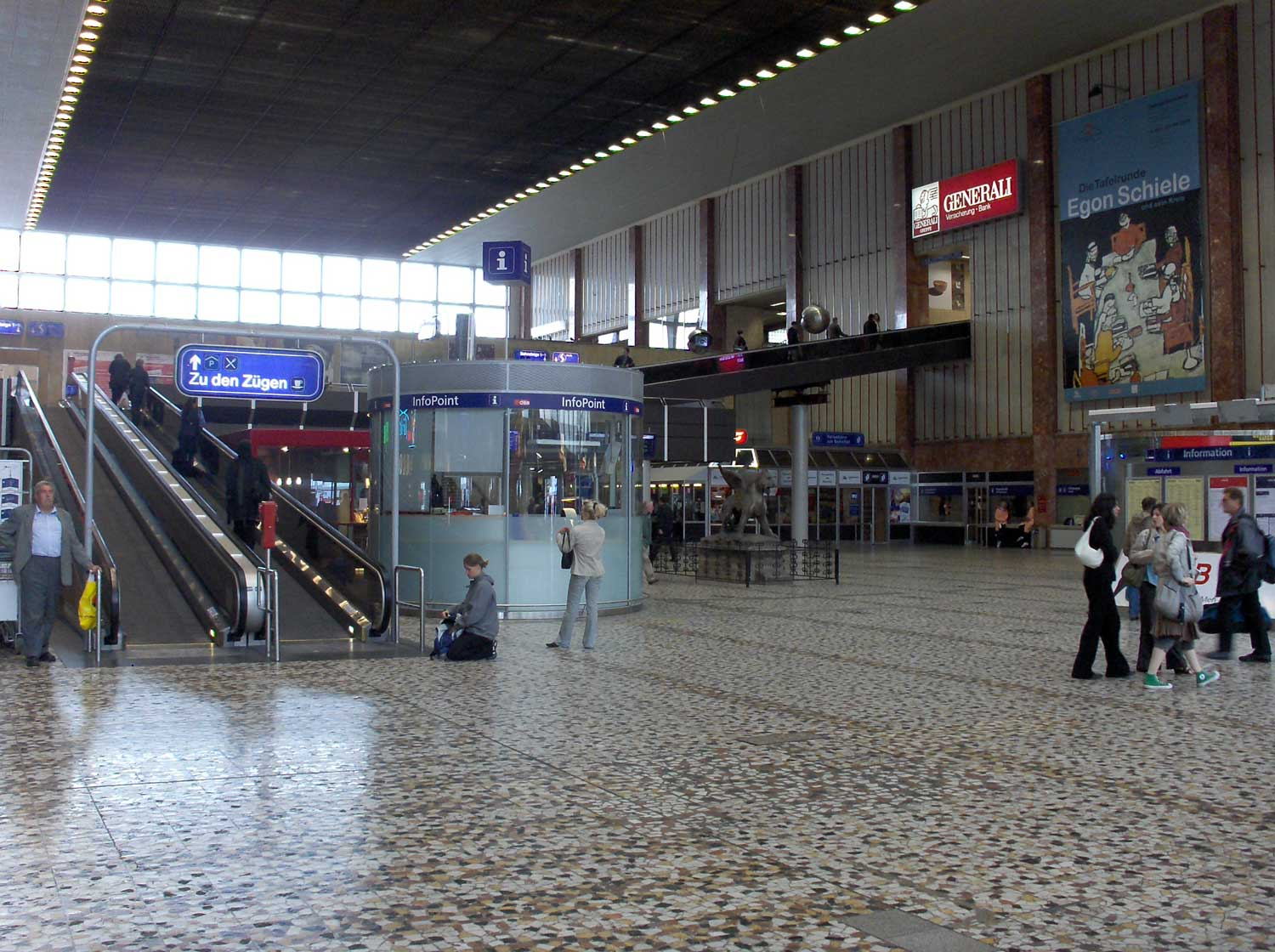
The main hall of the Südbahnhof

Wien Südbahnhof (German for Vienna South Station) was Vienna's largest railway terminus. It closed in December 2009 and was demolished in 2010 to be replaced with a new station, Wien Hauptbahnhof. It was located in Favoriten, in the south-east of the city. The East-bound rail services of Südbahnhof remained in operation until 2012 at a temporary train station "Südbahnhof (Ostbahn)".

== History ==
=== Predecessors ===
The earliest antecedents of the modern Südbahnhof were the Gloggnitzer Bahnhof, the start of the South railway, and the Raaber Bahnhof, the start of the East railway, which were built by Matthias Schönerer in a classical style (1841–1846). The two stations were placed symmetrically, and both made use of the same depots and workyards.

=== Divided eastward and southward section ===
In the course of industrialisation, the need for rail transportation grew, and the Austrian railways passed from private hands into government control. The old Raaber Bahnhof was replaced between 1867 and 1870 by the Centralbahnhof ("central station"), designed by A. Schumann, then in 1910 by the Staatsbahnhof ("State station") and in 1914, the Ostbahnhof ("eastern station").

The Gloggnitzer Bahnhof was also re-built to a design by Wilhelm von Flattich in 1874 (too late for the Weltausstellung), when it was renamed Süd-Bahnhof.

Two railway lines were planned, extending from Vienna to the south and east: one to Wiener Neustadt and Gloggnitz, and one via Bruck an der Leitha to Győr (German: Raab), with an extension to Uj-Szöny (now a suburb of Komárom) and a branch line to Pozsony (German: Preßburg, now Bratislava). This last branch line was, however, never realised.

Initially, the Hungarian lines carried more freight, and were thought to be the more valuable, with plans being proposed to extend the line to Croatia and the Austro-Hungarian port of Trieste. The route to Gloggnitz was stifled by competition from the canal between Vienna and Wiener Neustadt, but benefited from passenger transport to tourist destinations such as Mödling, Gumpoldskirchen, Baden and Bad Vöslau, making it the first Austrian railway to target passenger traffic directly.

According to Matthias Schönerer, who was involved in every major Austrian railway project at the time, rather than a single station, it would be most sensible to build two termini at an obtuse angle to each other. The locomotive factory and other works were to be placed in the space between the two.

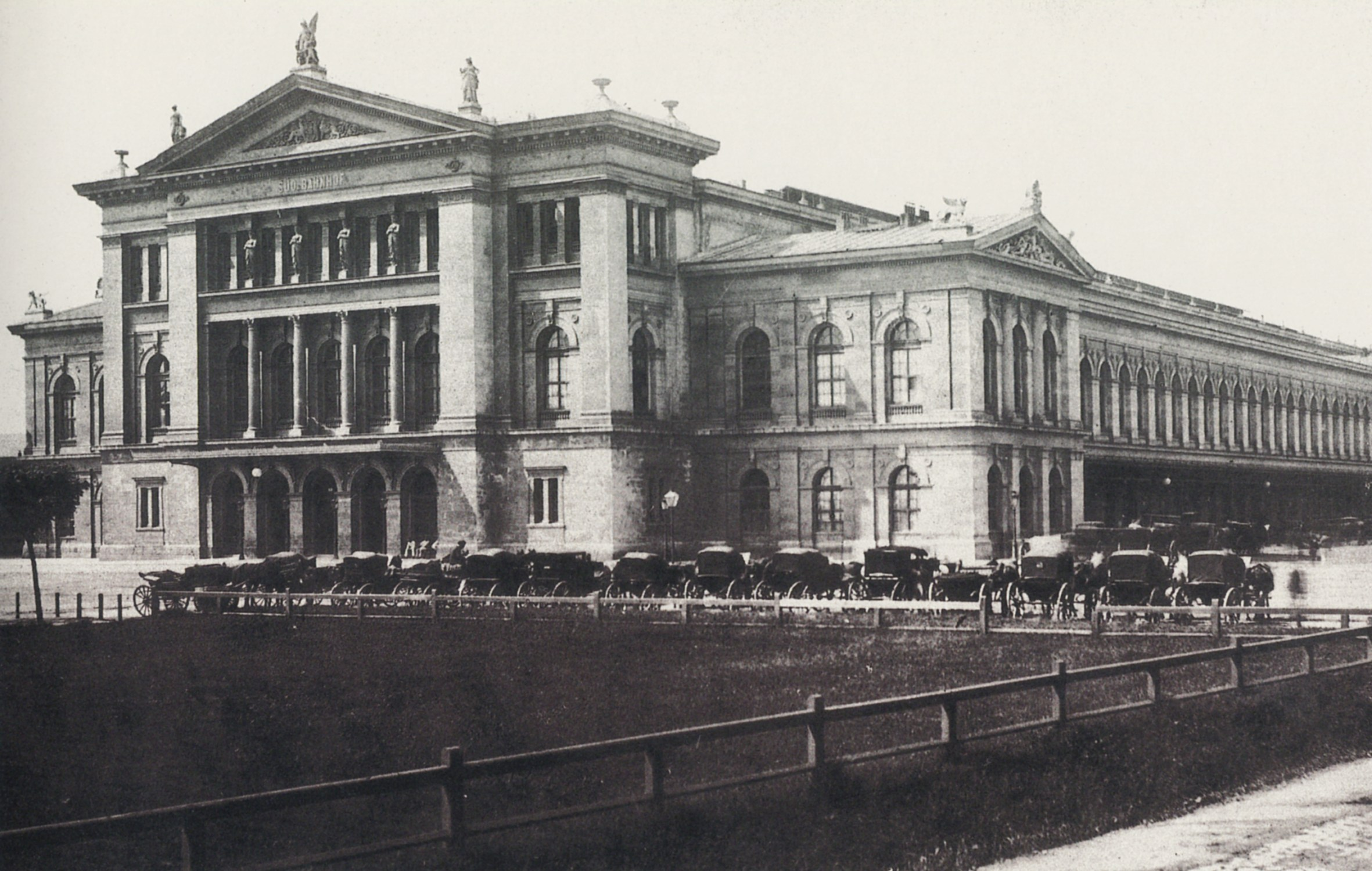
Vienna Südbahnhof, c. 1875

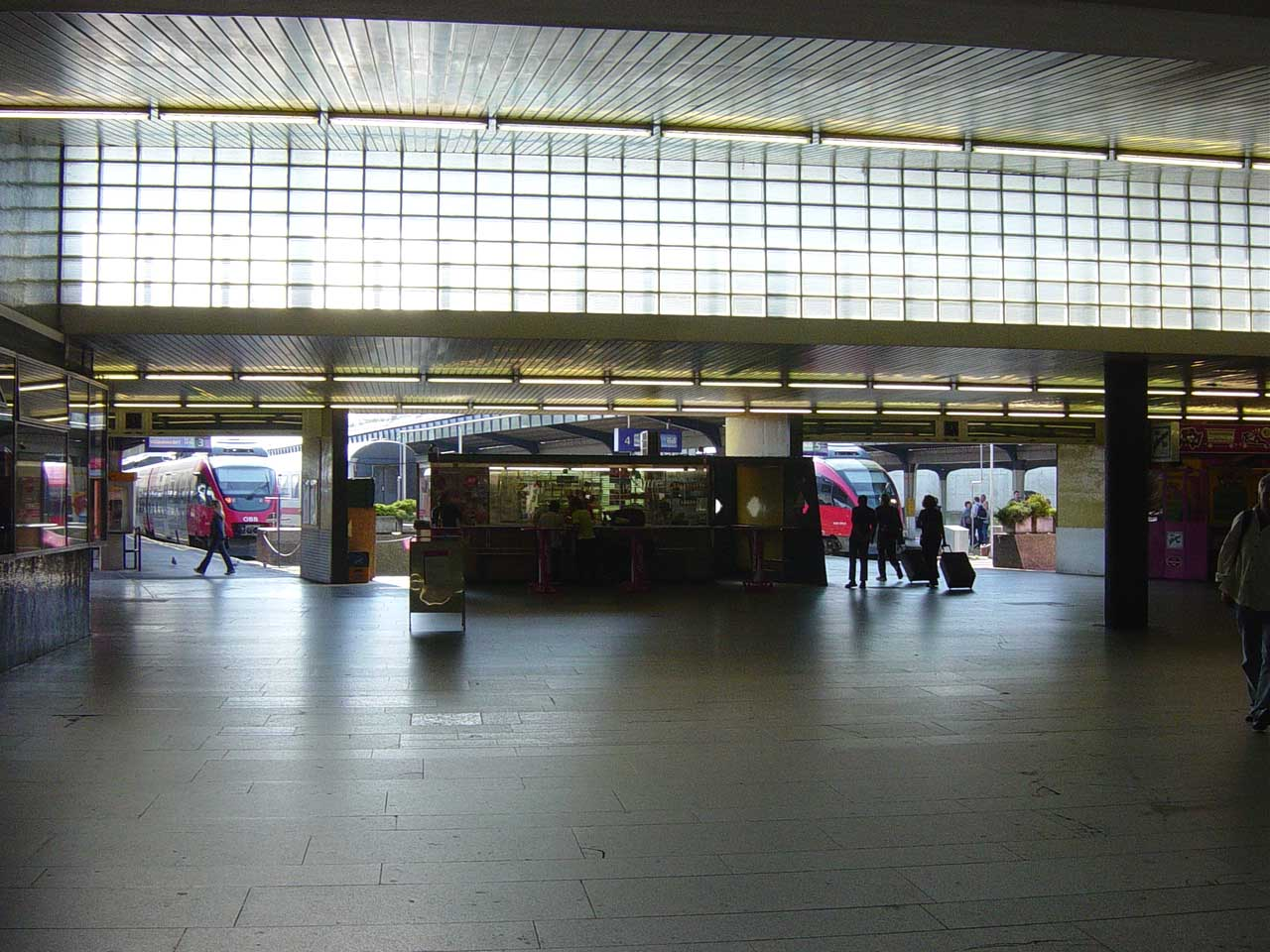
To the platforms

The passenger station was built in a classical style, as was usual for public buildings around 1840. The entrance and exit were through the front of the building, which faced the location of the modern Schweizergarten, the station being considerably closer to Südtiroler Platz then than it is now.

The entrance hall was connected to the concourse on the first floor (AmE: second floor) by a staircase. The concourse was the first in Austria, comprised four platforms, large bow windows and was covered by a sturdy 23-metre wide construction of wooden beams held together by iron bands. A house between the two stations served as a restaurant, and was the only building to survive the re-building works on the following 110 years, although the two stations later received separate culinary facilities.

During the boom of the Gründerzeit, a new and larger Südbahnhof was planned by Wilhelm von Flattich, and building was completed in 1874. Including the peripheral wings, the new station was about three times wider than the old one, and the hall was broadened to 35.7 metres (the second largest in Vienna), which was enough for five (later six) platforms. Further platforms for local trains were built to the south of the main hall. The Südbahnhof remained largely unchanged from 1874 to 1945. It served the lines south to Ljubljana, Trieste, Maribor, Carinthia, East Tyrol, South Tyrol and Zagreb. Until 1914, the CIWL express from St. Petersburg to Cannes stopped there; a remnant of this line, the Vienna-Cannes express continued to travel to and from the Südbahnhof until 1939.

As far back as the time of the Gloggnitzer Bahn, the railway southwards from Vienna was the busiest in the area. It was nationalised in 1924, although the properties remained in the hands of the Donau-Save-Adria-Eisenbahn AG until Anschluß in 1938. In contrast to other Viennese stations, the Südbahnhof was relatively undamaged by the Second World War; a small number of bombs fell on it, and a great deal of glass was broken in the fighting in April 1945. The steel framework was largely undamaged and services were soon restarted, although it became clear that renovation works would be necessary.

=== The modern building ===
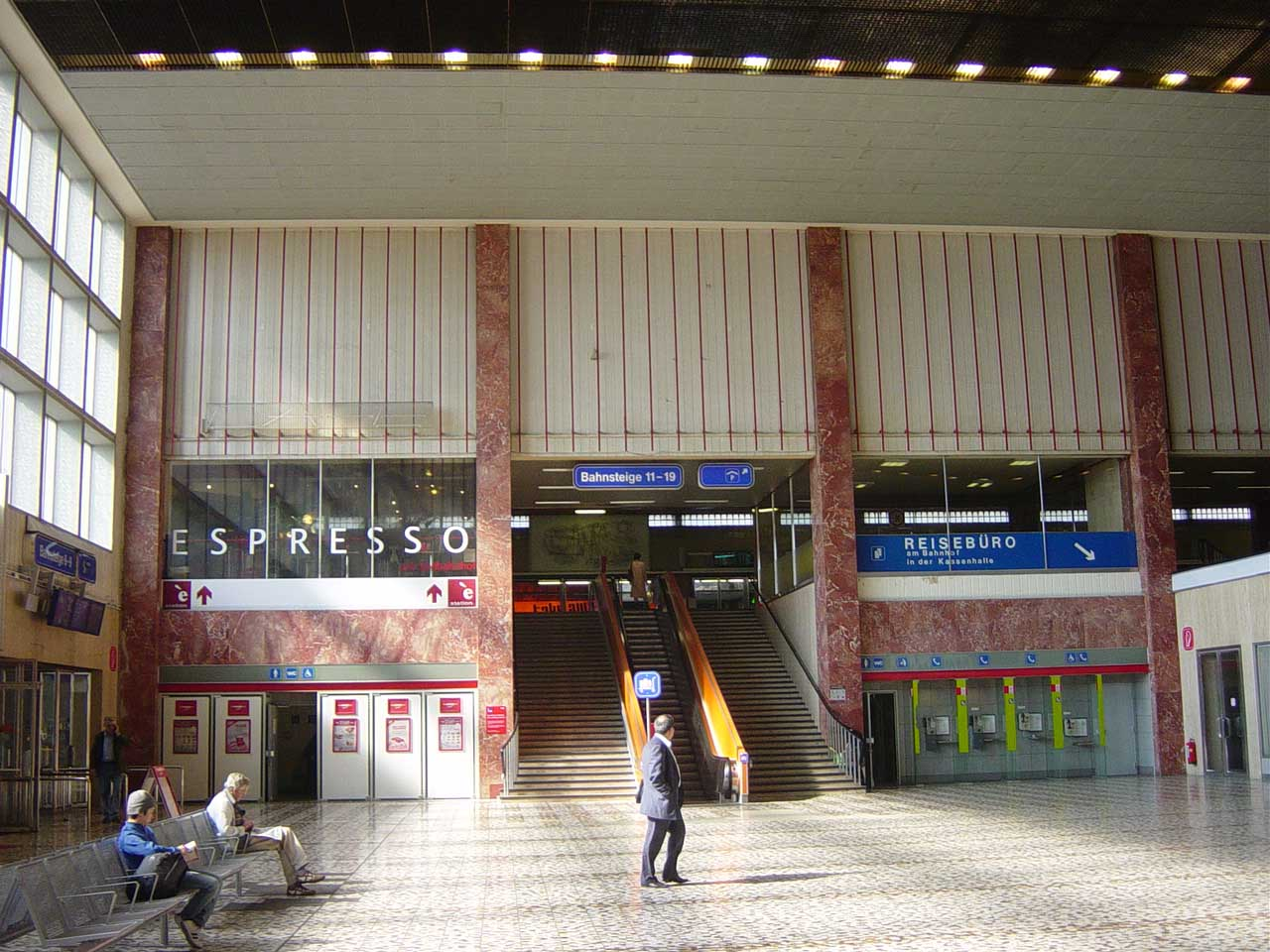
Interior view of Vienna Südbahnhof

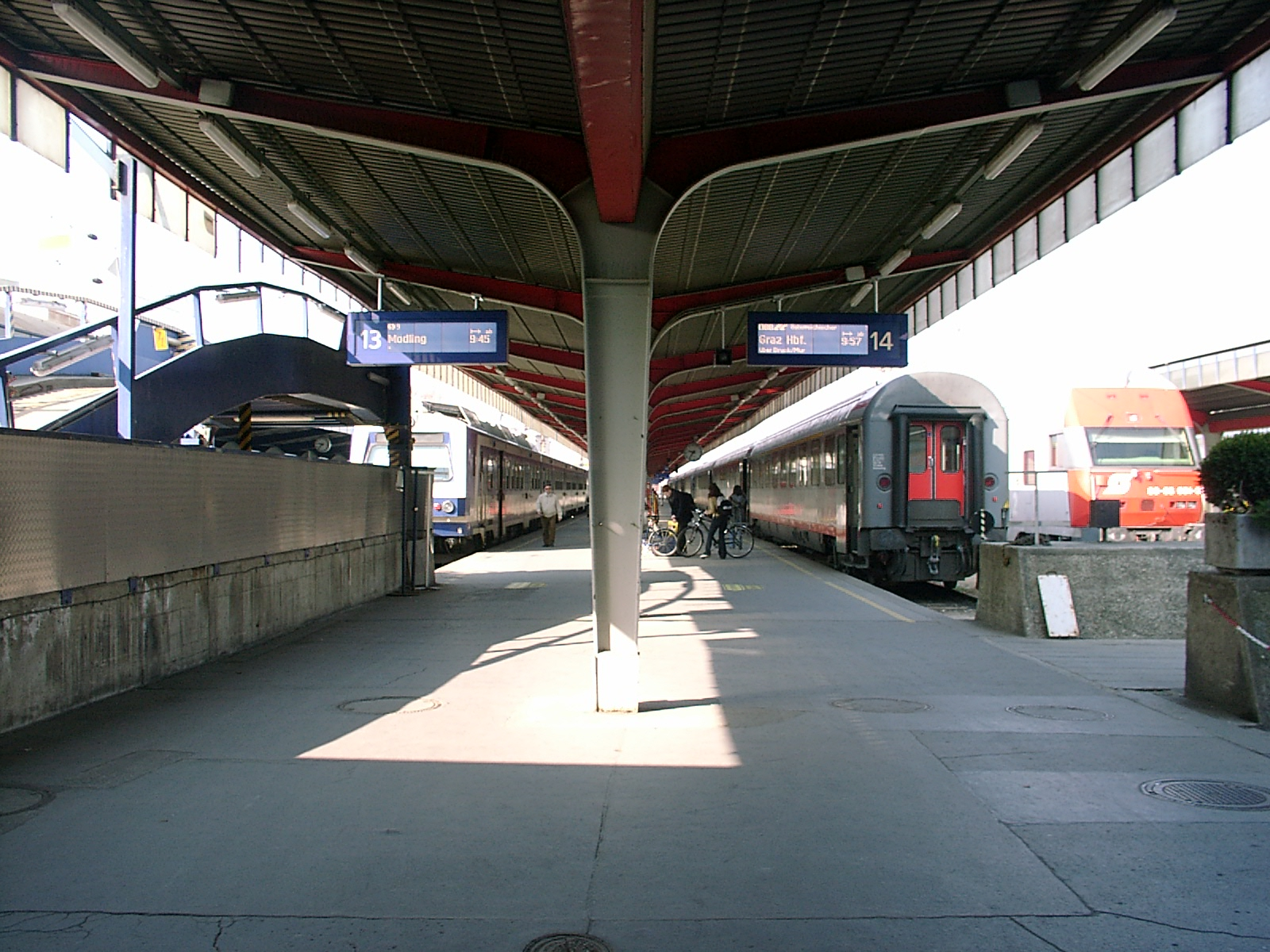
Platforms at the Südbahnhof, with an S-Bahn train (left), a EuroCity train (centre) and a regional train (right)

Following the war, no reason could be found not to unite the two earlier railway stations into a single building. In particular, both railways had come into the ownership of the same company, the ÖBB (Austrian federal railways). The modern Südbahnhof was built between 1955 and 1961 to plans by Heinrich Hrdlicka, in which the twin stations were united in a single building. Two underground platforms serve the S-Bahn network (lines S1, S2 and S3), known since the demolition of the main line platforms as Wien Quartier Belvedere. At about the same time, the line between Vienna and Gloggnitz was electrified. During the re-building, the Südbahnhof was extended towards the Schweizergarten, while the constituent parts of the old main hall were numbered and taken away to be used at a depot in Floridsdorf.

The interior of the Südbahnhof comprised a large hall with small shops and ticket counters around the edges. Platforms 11–18 (equivalent to the old Ostbahn) were one level higher, and platforms 1–9 (equivalent to the old Südbahn) were two levels above the main hall.

The front of the Südbahnhof was served by tram lines O and 18. The side entrance on Schweizergartenstraße was served by tram line D and bus 13A. The nearest access to the U-Bahn network was a few hundred metres to the west, at Südtiroler Platz.

In 1969, a car loading bay was built for the introduction of car carrier trains.

== Closing and the future ==
The railway station closed on 13 December 2009 and was demolished in 2010 to be replaced with housing and commercial estate. A new station, Wien Hauptbahnhof, was constructed with the main entrance moved further east to Südtiroler Platz to facilitate interconnection with public transport. The new station opened partially on 9 December 2012 and was fully operational in 2015. The former S-Bahn platforms at Südbahnhof were renamed Quartier Belvedere.

== See also ==
- Rail transport in Austria
- Wien Hauptbahnhof
- Wien Westbahnhof
