= Vienna Airport railway station =

Railway station in Lower Austria

Flughafen Wien
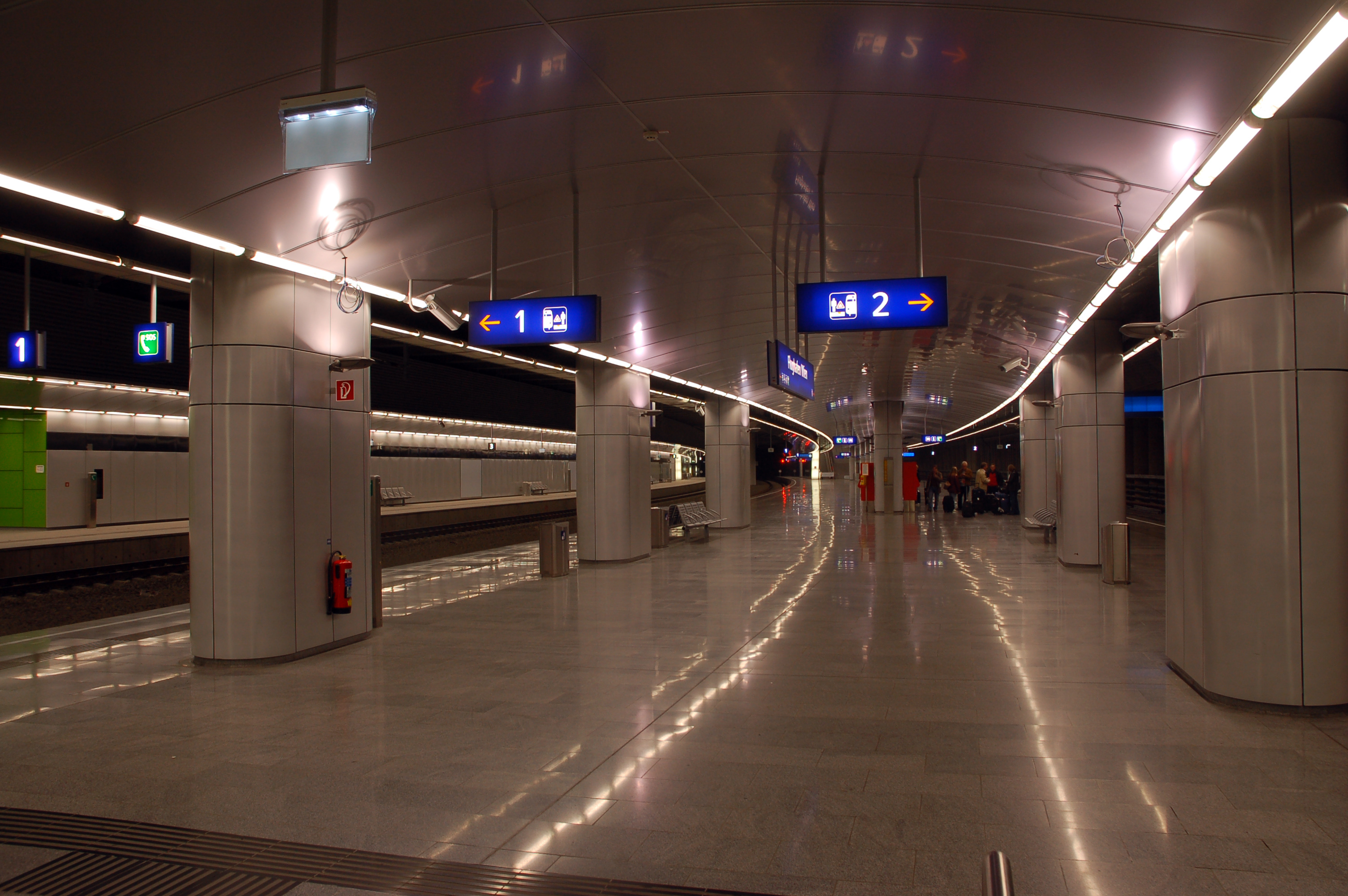
- Vienna Airport railway station

General information
- Location: Vienna International Airport; Austria
- Coordinates: 48°07′15″N 16°33′47″E
- Owner: ÖBB
- Operator: ÖBB
- Line: Wien–Pressburg railway
- Platforms: 1 island 1 side
- Tracks: 3

Other information
- Station code: Fws

History
- Opened: 25 September 1977; 48 years ago

Services
Preceding station	Vienna S-Bahn	Following station
Fischamend towards Wolfsthal	S7	Mannswörth towards Laa an der Thaya
Preceding station	City Airport Train	Following station
Terminus	CAT	Wien Mitte Terminus
Location
- Location within Austria

Vienna Airport (German: Flughafen Wien) is a railway station serving Vienna International Airport in Schwechat, Lower Austria, Austria. The train services are operated by ÖBB and Deutsche Bahn.

The station was opened in 1977 and was extensively rebuilt as part of the airport's Terminal 3 expansion and to allow long-distance traffic between 2003 and 2014.

== Train services ==
The station is served by the following services:

- Railjet (Bregenz –) (Innsbruck –) Salzburg – Linz – St. Pölten – Vienna Meidling station – Vienna Main Station – Vienna Airport (twice per hour)
- Intercity (Klagenfurt –) (Saalfelden –) Salzburg – Wels – Linz – Amstetten - St. Pölten – Tullnerfeld - Vienna Meidling station – Vienna Main Station – Vienna Airport (hourly)
- Local services (City Airport Train) Vienna Mitte station - Vienna Airport (twice per hour)
- Vienna S-Bahn services Vienna Floridsdorf station - Vienna Airport - Wolfsthal (twice per hour)

== See also ==
- Rail transport in Austria
