= Wien Geiselbergstraße railway station =

Railway station in Vienna, Austria

Geiselbergstraße
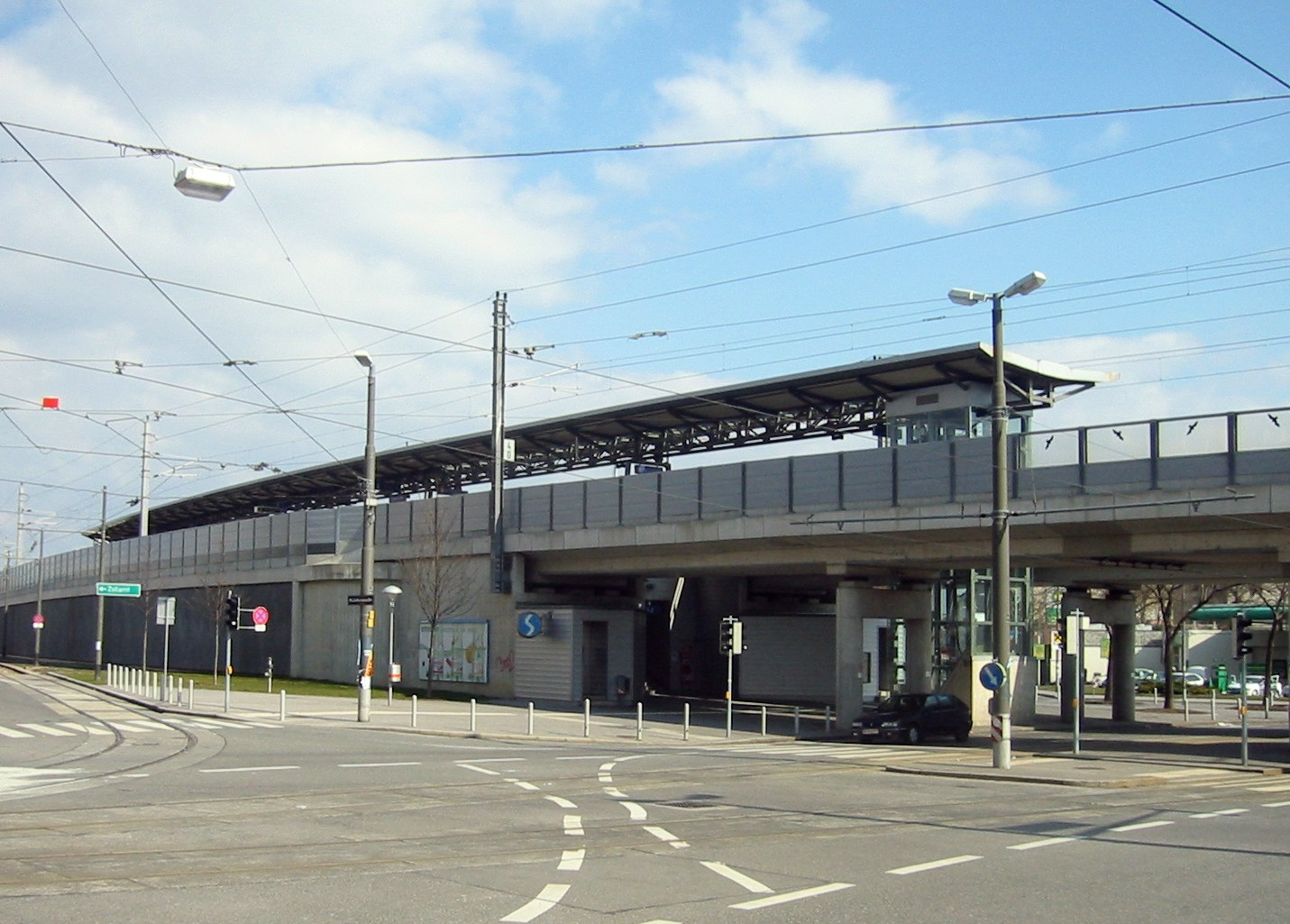

General information
- Location: Geiselbergstraße; 1110 Vienna; Austria
- Coordinates: 48°10′31.3″N 16°24′25.6″E
- Owner: ÖBB
- Operator: ÖBB
- Platforms: 1 island
- Tracks: 2

Services
Preceding station	Vienna S-Bahn	Following station
Wien Zentralfriedhof towards Wolfsthal	S7	Wien St. Marx towards Laa an der Thaya
Location
- Location within Vienna

Wien Geiselbergstraße is a railway station serving Simmering, the eleventh district of Vienna. It is located on an elevated s-curve and was built during the 2002 relocation of parts of the Aspangbahn.
