= Wien St. Marx railway station =

Railway station in Vienna, Austria

Vienna Bio Center St. Marx
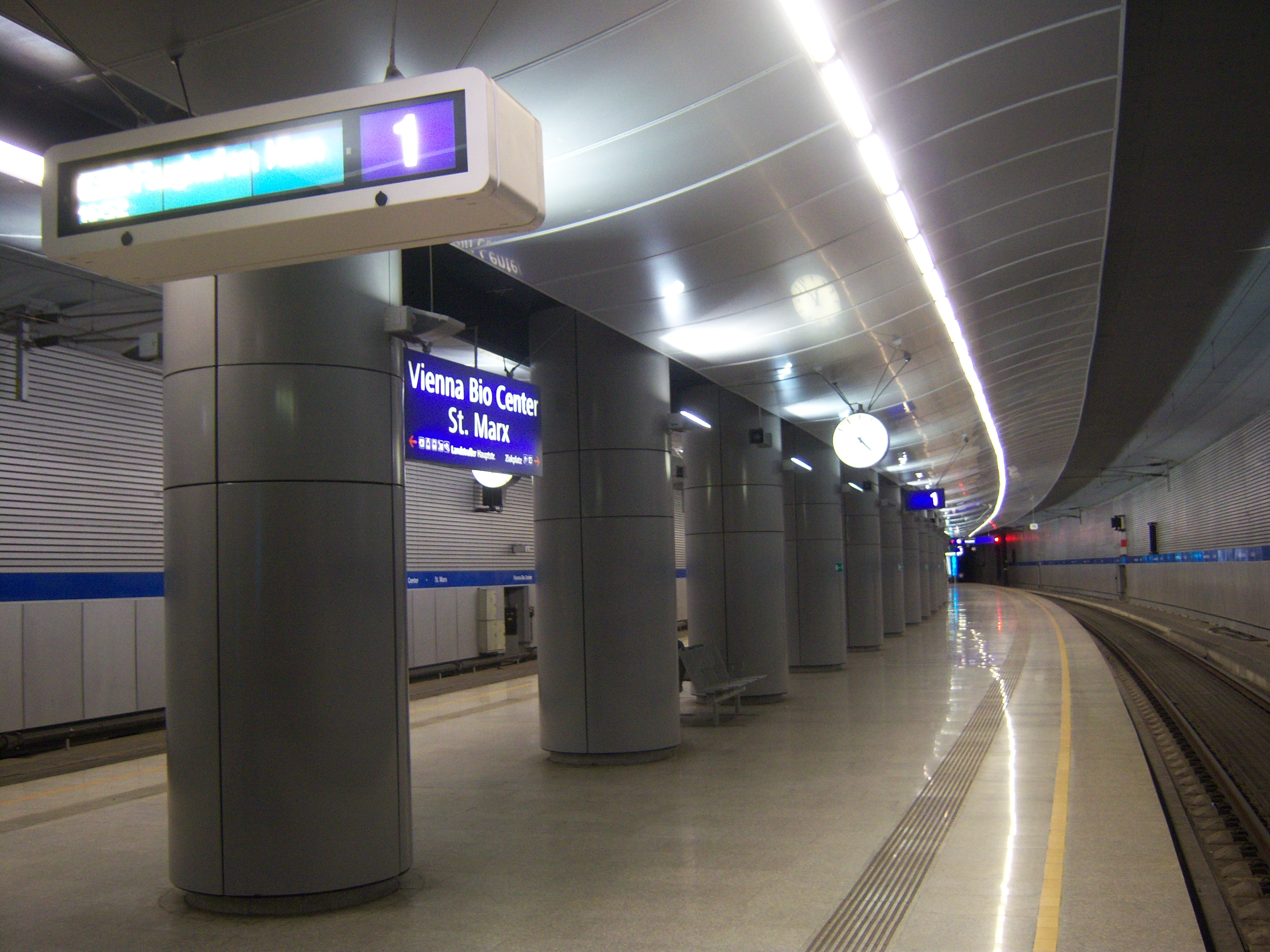

General information
- Location: 1030 Vienna; Austria
- Coordinates: 48°11′17″N 16°23′59″E
- Owner: ÖBB
- Operator: ÖBB
- Platforms: 1 island
- Tracks: 2

Services
Preceding station	Vienna S-Bahn	Following station
Wien Geiselbergstraße towards Wolfsthal	S7	Wien Rennweg towards Laa an der Thaya
Location
- Location within Vienna

Wien St.Marx, also referred to as Vienna Bio Center/St. Marx, is a railway station serving Landstraße, the third district of Vienna. It was rebuilt in 2002 as part of a project to relocate the Aspangbahn to an underground tunnel.

== Images ==
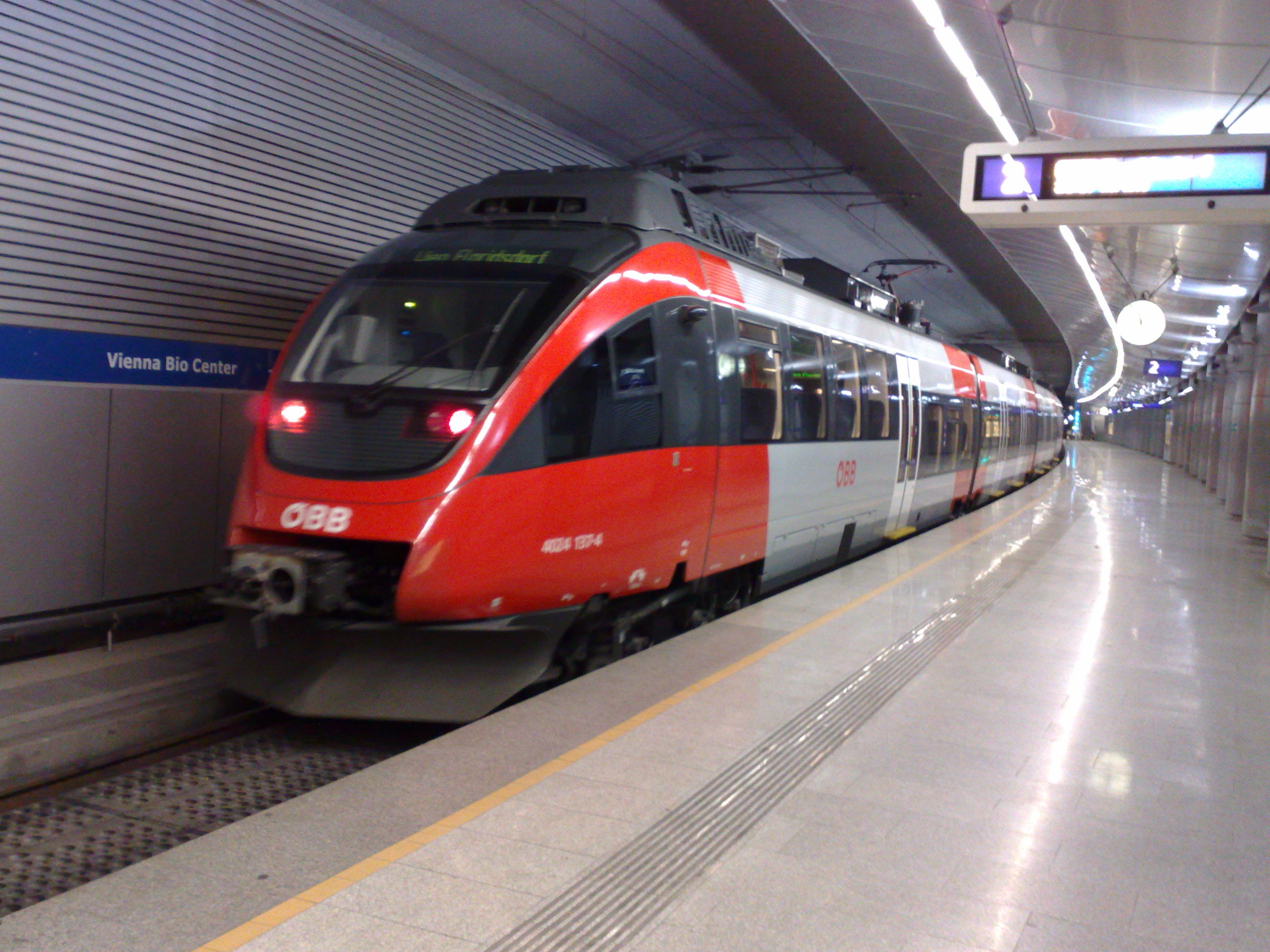
An S7 train heading towards Wien Floridsdorf

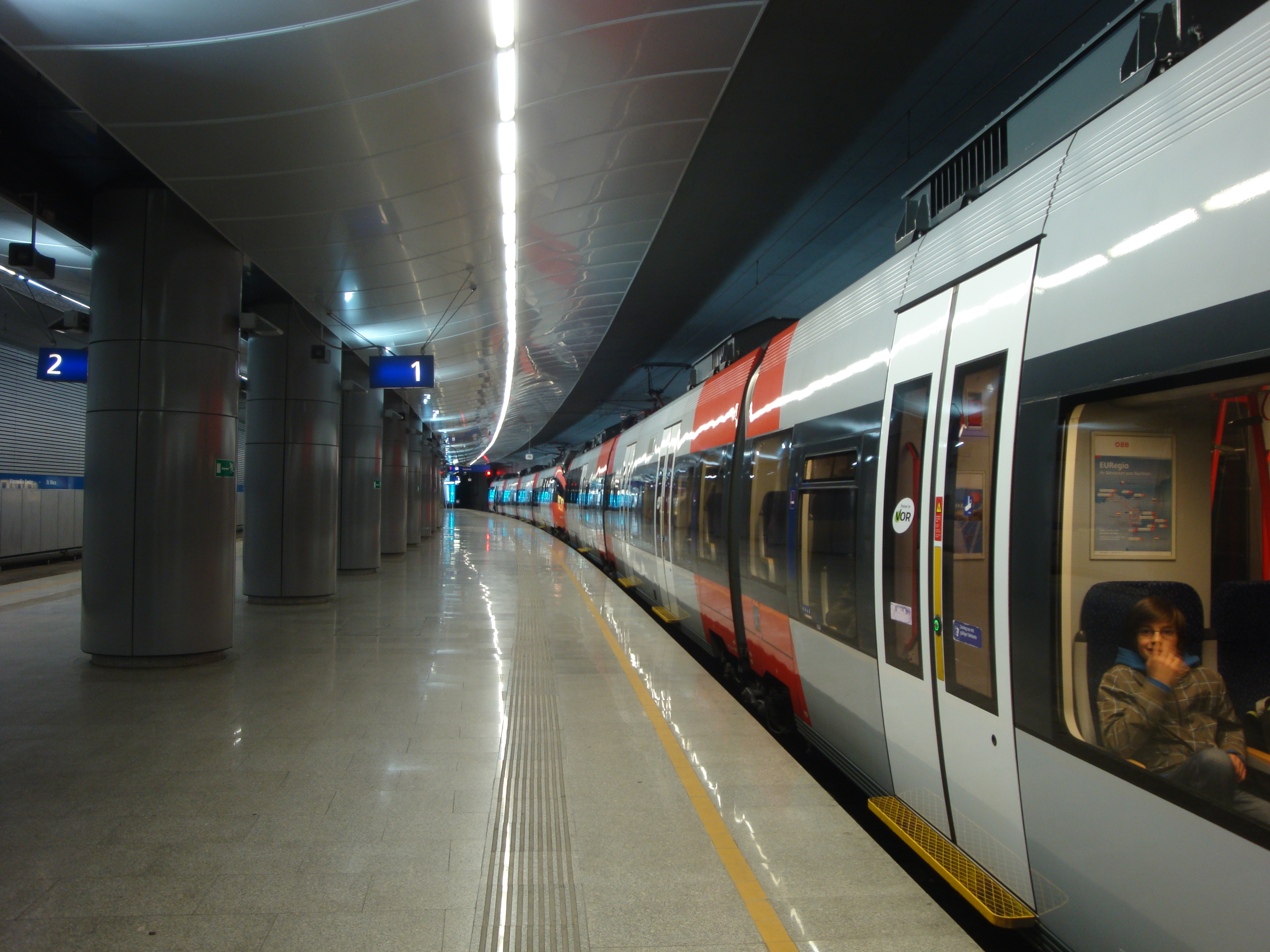
A southbound S7 train

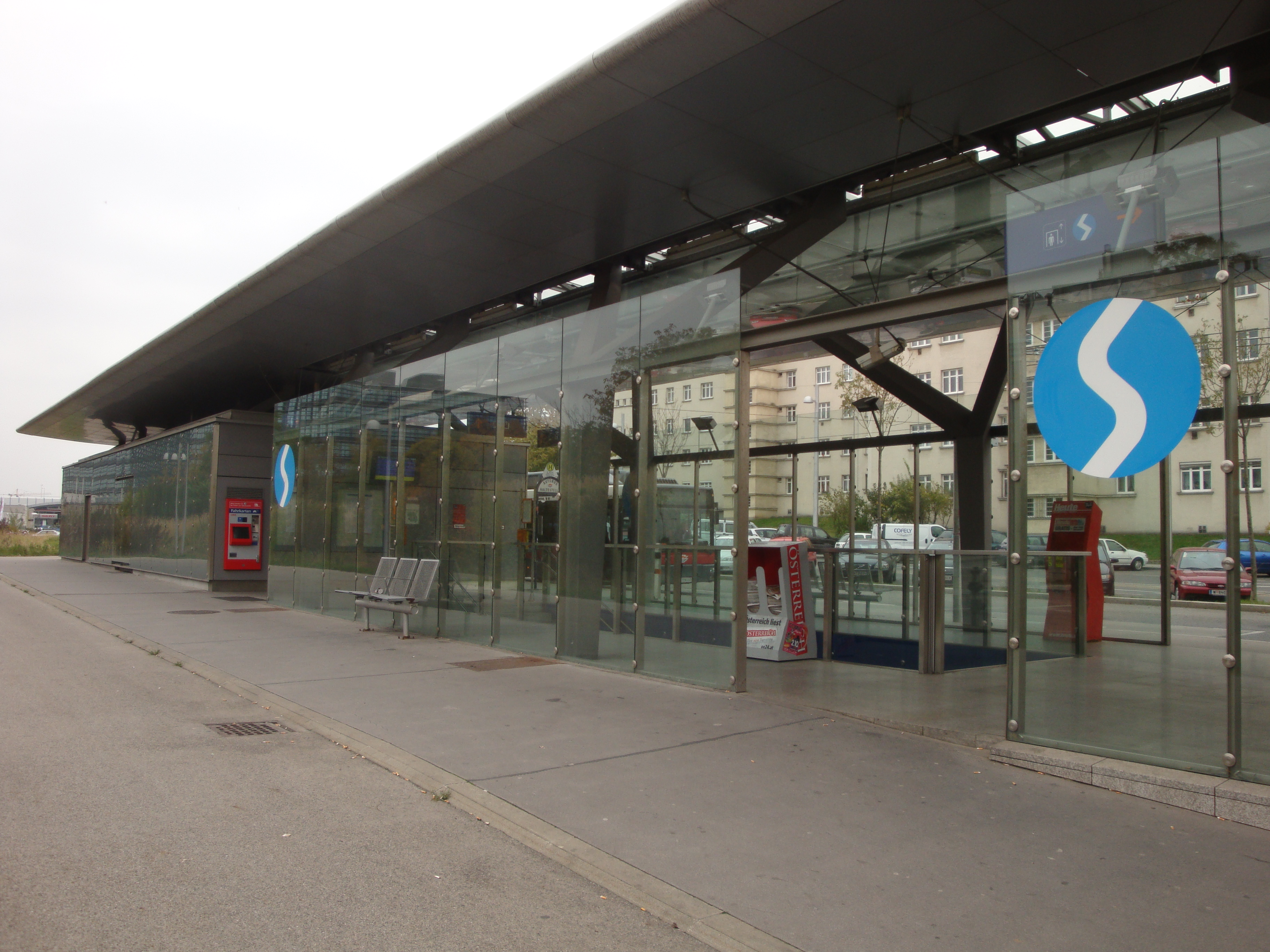
Entrance to the station

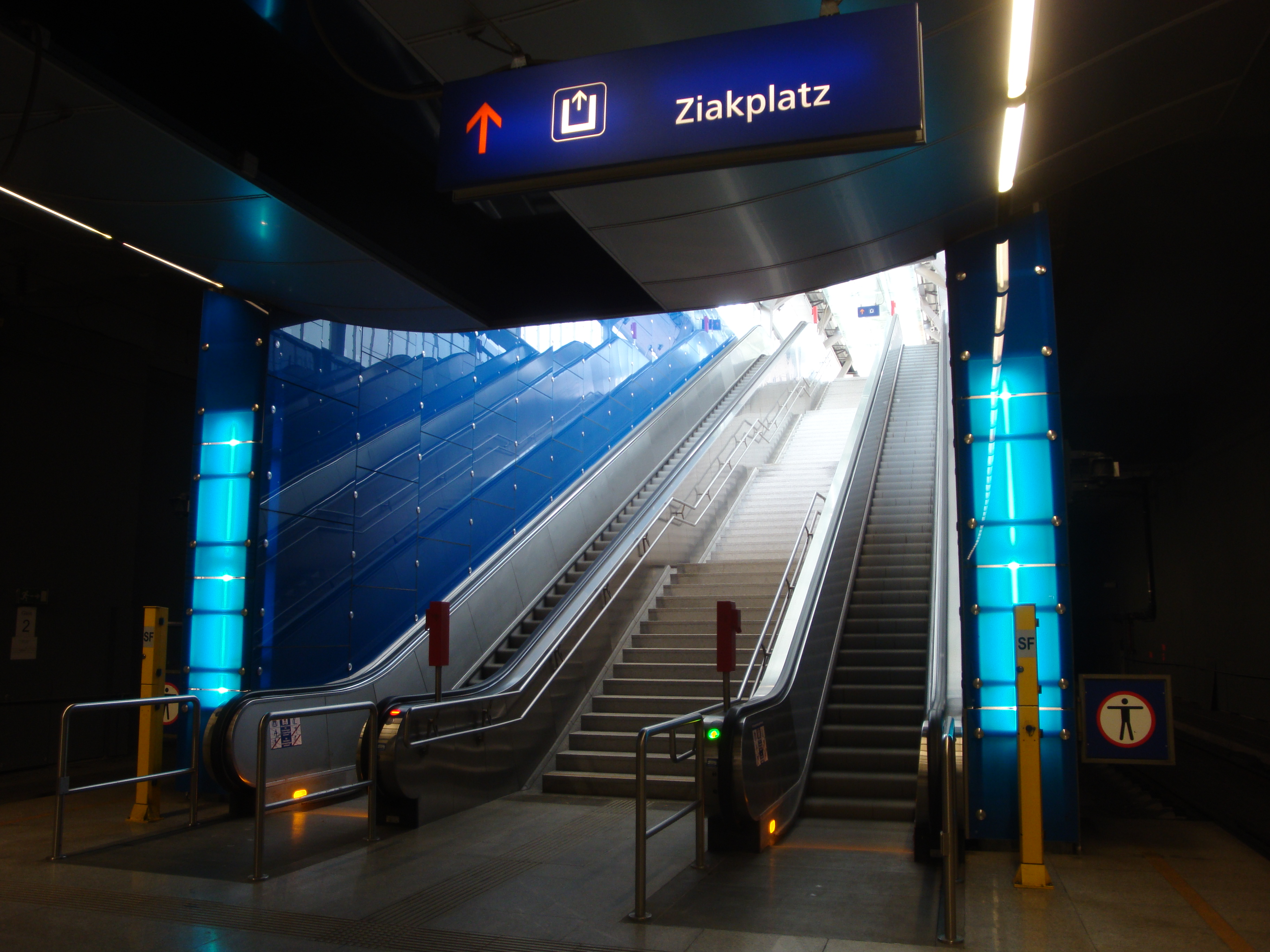
An exit, as seen from the platform

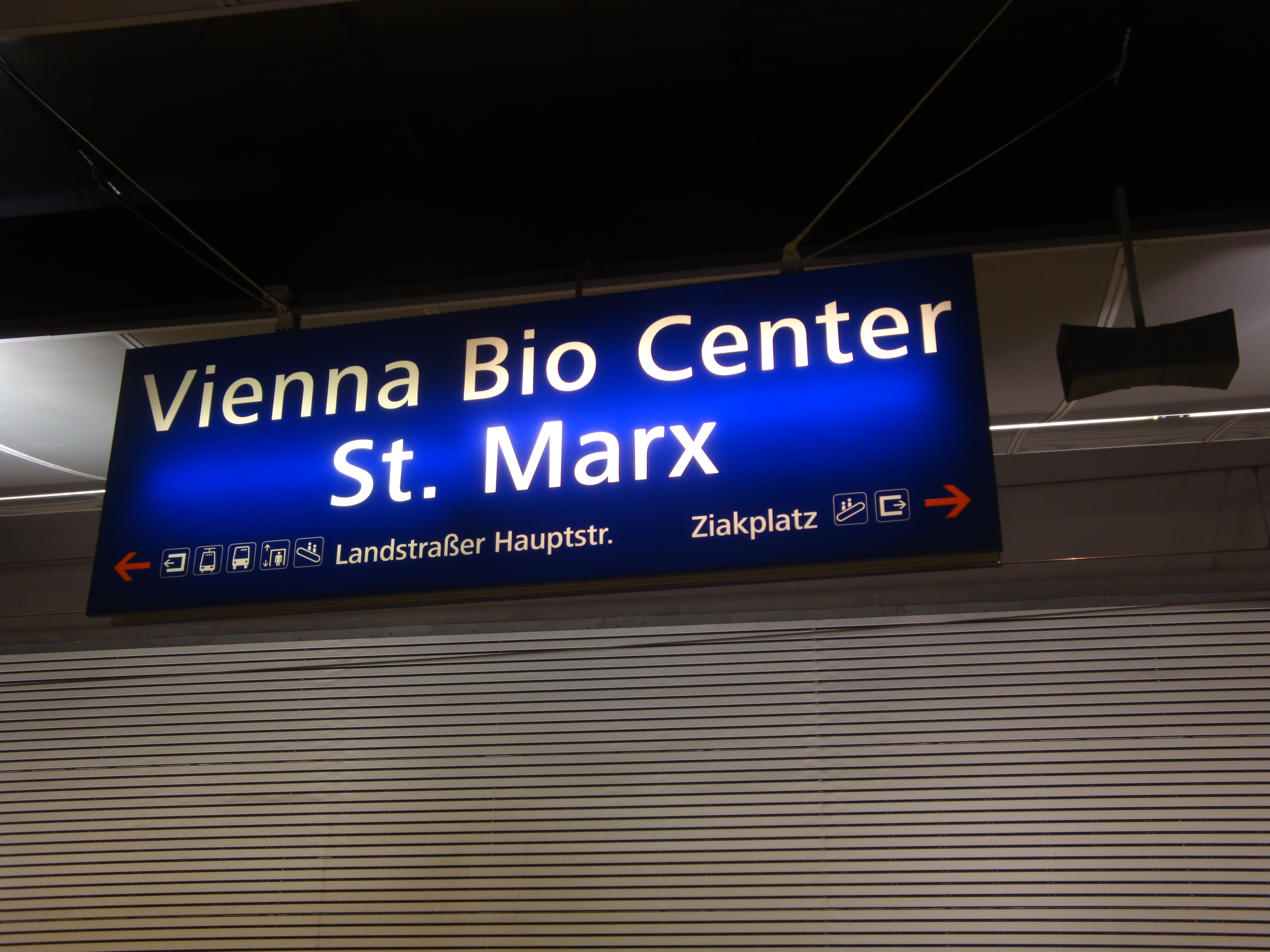
Station sign

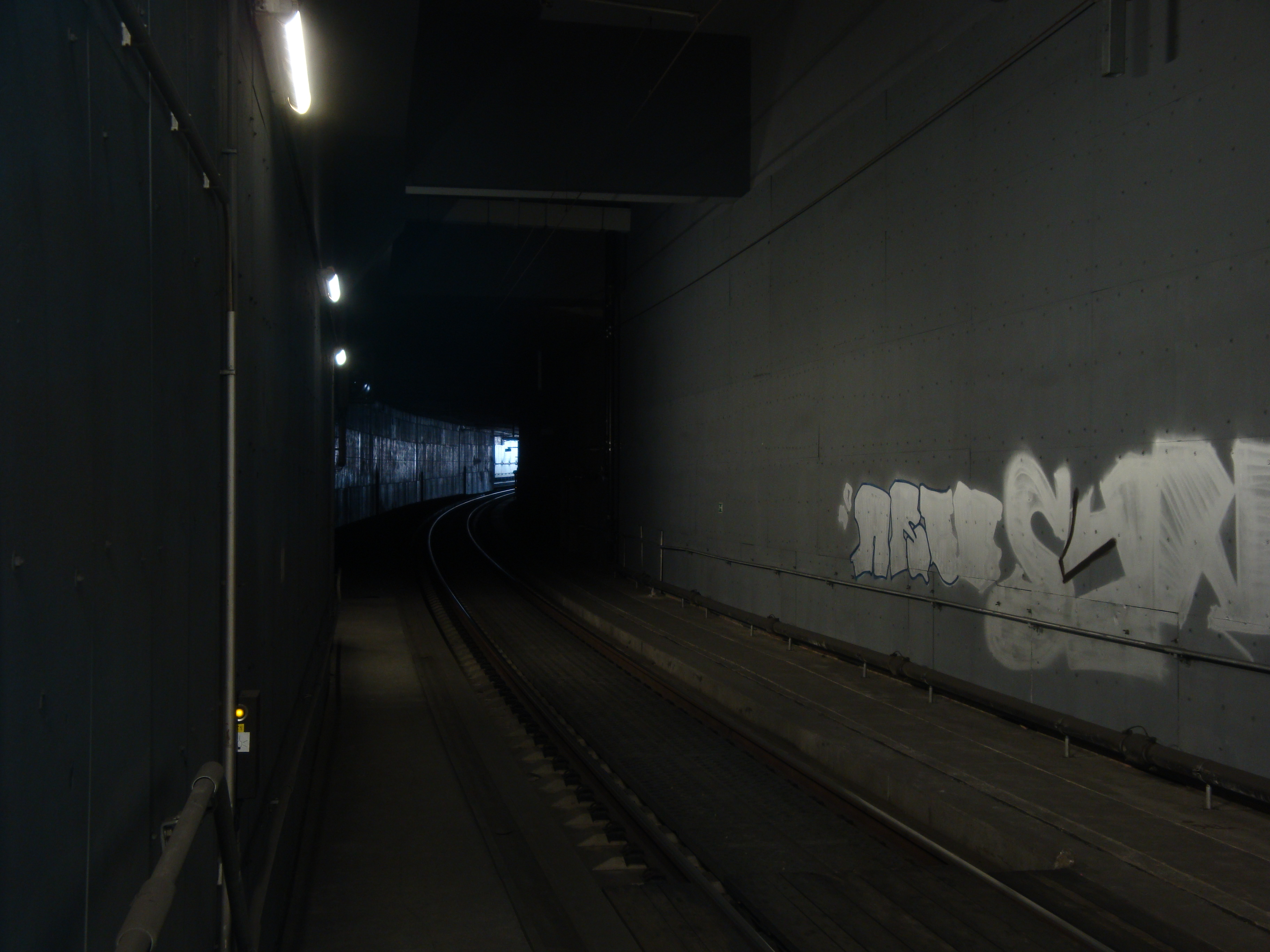
View southbound through the tunnel from the platform
