= Berg, Lower Austria =

Berg
- Municipality
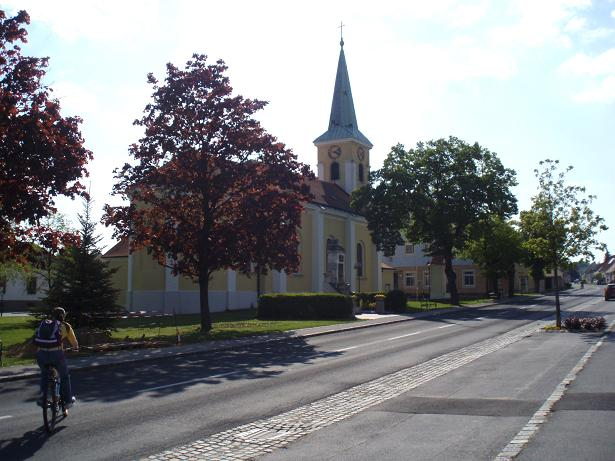
- Church of Saint Anne

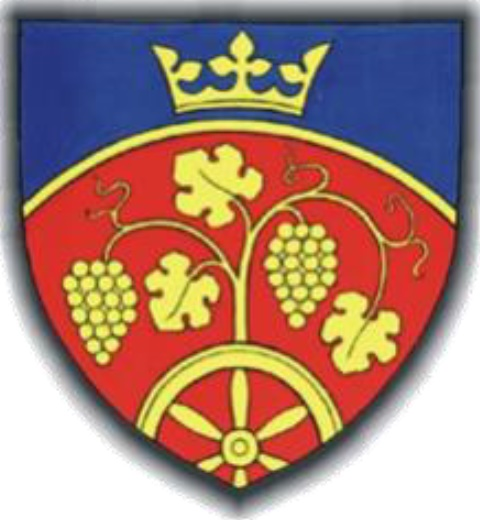
- Coat of arms

- Location within Austria
- Coordinates: 48°6′N 17°2′E
- Country: Austria
- State: Lower Austria
- District: Bruck an der Leitha

Government
  - Mayor: Andreas Hammer (SPÖ)

Area
  - Total: 9.46 km^{2} (3.65 sq mi)
- Elevation: 154 m (505 ft)

Population (2018-01-01)
  - Total: 861
  - Density: 91.0/km^{2} (236/sq mi)
- Time zone: UTC+1 (CET)
  - Summer (DST): UTC+2 (CEST)
- Postal code: 2413
- Area code: 02143
- Website: www.gemeindeberg.at

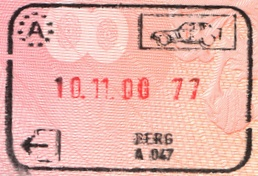
Passport stamp from the border before Slovakia joined the Schengen Area

Berg (Austrian German pronunciation: [bɛrɡ]) is a town in the district of Bruck an der Leitha in Lower Austria in Austria. It, along with neighboring Wolfsthal were part of the municipality of Wolfsthal-Berg until 1996.

There is a border crossing into Slovakia, with the Bratislava suburb of Petržalka across the border. Since December 21, 2007, no more checks are conducted at the crossing with Slovakia joining the Schengen Area.

== Geography ==
Berg lies in the foothills of the Hundsheimer mountains, at the foot of the Königswarte (344 m).
