= Wien Mitte railway station =

Railway station in Vienna, Austria

Wien Mitte
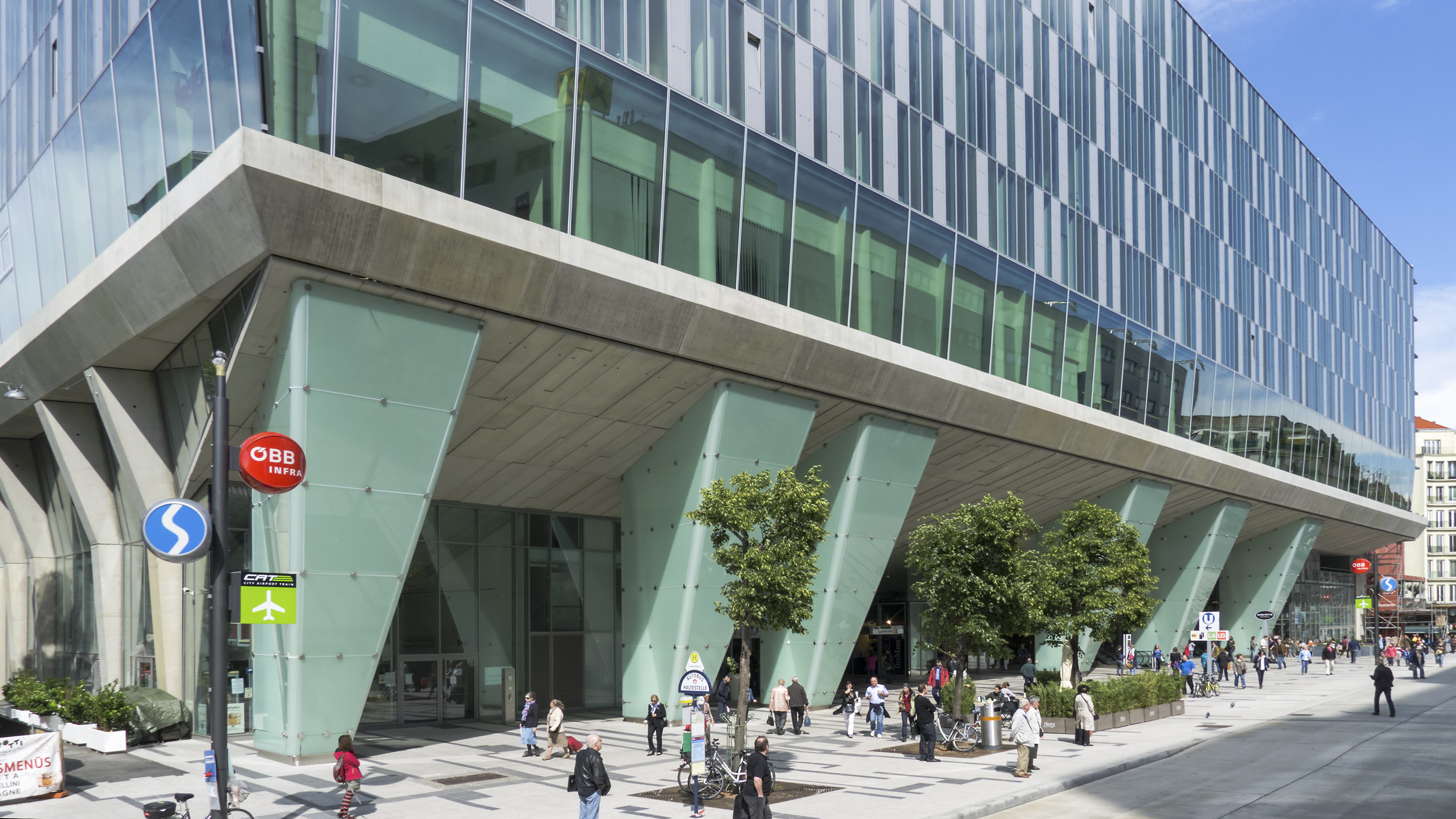

General information
- Location: Vienna; Austria
- Coordinates: 48.206389°N 16.384722°E
- Owner: Austrian Federal Railways (ÖBB)
- Operator: Austrian Federal Railways (ÖBB)
- Line: Verbindungsbahn
- Platforms: 3
- Connections: S-Bahn: S1, S2, S3, S7; City Airport Train; Landstraße (Vienna U-Bahn) O 74A N75 L

History
- Opened: 1 July 1859; 167 years ago
- Rebuilt: 1901, 1962, 2013
Services
Preceding station	Vienna S-Bahn	Following station
Wien Rennweg towards Wien Meidling	S1	Wien Praterstern towards Marchegg
Wien Rennweg towards Mödling	S2	Wien Praterstern towards Laa an der Thaya
Wien Rennweg towards Wiener Neustadt Hbf	S3	Wien Praterstern towards Hollabrunn
Wien Rennweg towards Wiener Neustadt Hbf	S4	Wien Praterstern towards Absdorf-Hippersdorf
Wien Rennweg towards Wolfsthal	S7	Wien Praterstern towards Laa an der Thaya
Preceding station	City Airport Train	Following station
Flughafen Wien Terminus	CAT	Terminus
Location
- Location within Austria

Wien Mitte is a rail and U-Bahn station in Vienna, close to the city centre. It is the city terminus of Vienna's City Airport Train (CAT), which provides non-stop service to Vienna International Airport. The station is a major hub for S-Bahn suburban trains, with little service by InterCity trains. The station is connected to the Landstraße U-Bahn station.

== History ==
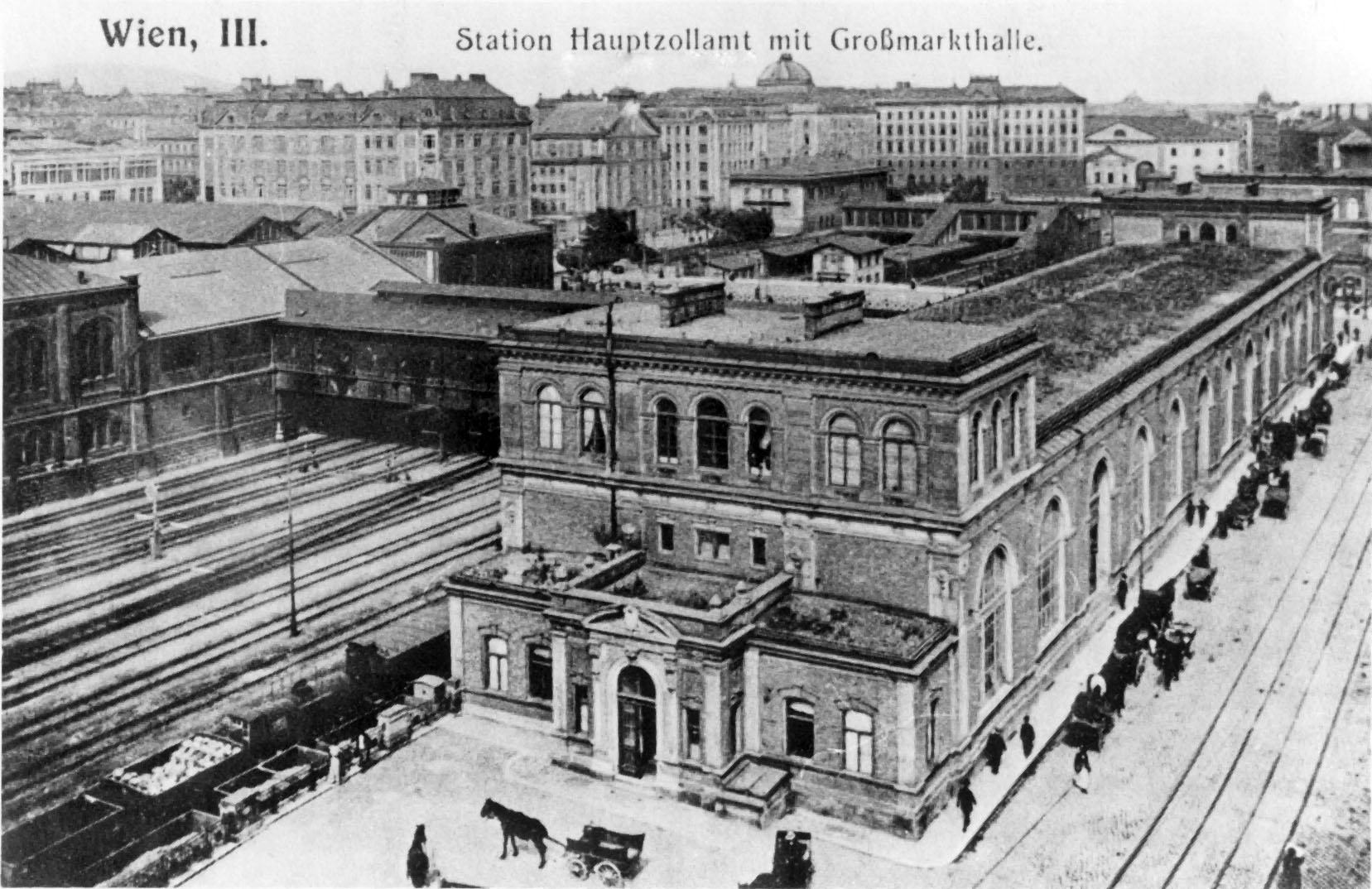
Hauptzollamt station and market hall in 1905

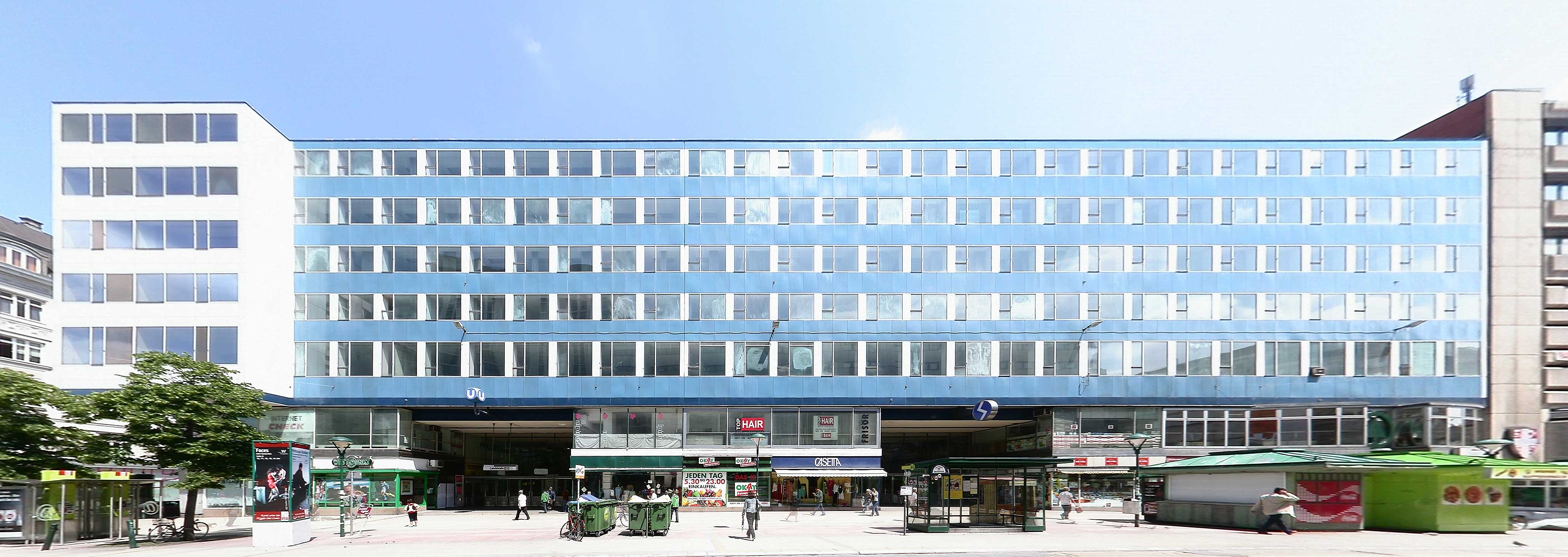
1962–2006 station building

The first station to occupy this site was called Hauptzollamt and opened in 1859. It was rebuilt between 1899 and 1901 to connect with the Stadtbahn, which ran below ground. When the S-Bahn opened in 1962, this station was renamed Landstraße, which remains the name of the U-Bahn portion. The main portion of the station was renamed Wien Mitte after it became a stop for international trains in 1975 due to construction at the Wien Franz-Josefs-Bahnhof. In 1999, a proposal for the new Wien Mitte station building, which was to include two new high-rise buildings up to 97 metres, drew massive controversy from many Viennese residents as well as UNESCO, who questioned whether said proposal was compatible with the World Heritage Site status of the neighbouring Old Town. The project in question was dropped in 2003, and a newer, heavily downsized project, which became the present station building and shopping centre (Wien Mitte The Mall), was constructed between 2007 and 2013. The U-Bahn uses the facilities of the former S-Bahn station.

== City Airport Train ==
The City Airport Train's city terminus is located at Wien Mitte. The CAT terminal houses self-service kiosks, staffed check-in desks and baggage drops exclusively for CAT passengers. The journey to the airport via CAT takes 16 minutes.

== Services ==
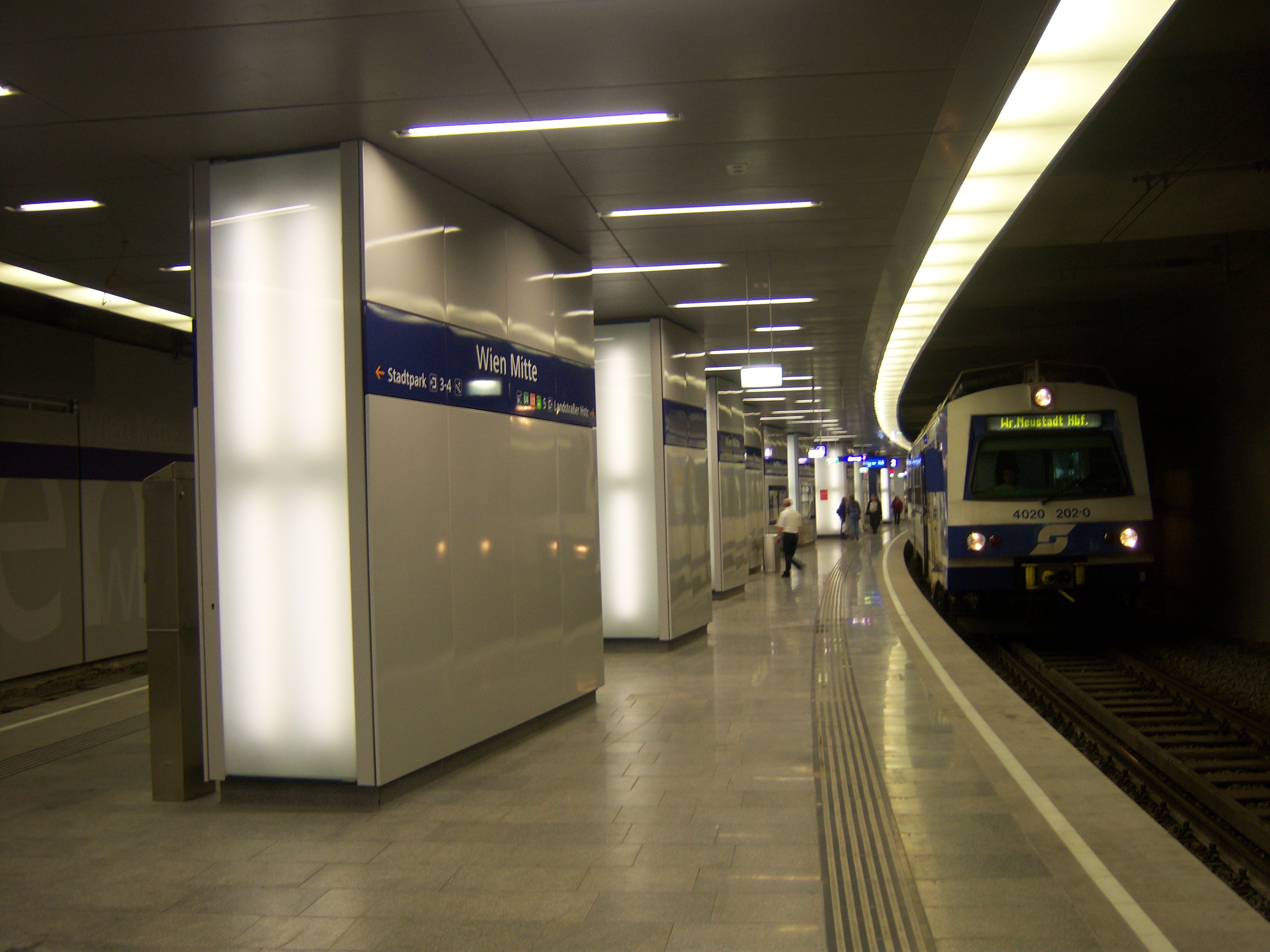
S-Bahn platform at Wien Mitte station

- Wien Meidling - Wien Hauptbahnhof - Wien Mitte - Wien Floridsdorf - Gänserndorf
- Mödling Wien Meidling - Wien Hauptbahnhof - Wien Mitte - Wien Floridsdorf - Wolkersdorf - Mistelbach - Laa an der Thaya
- Wiener Neustadt Hbf - Baden - Mödling - Wien Meidling - Wien Hauptbahnhof - Wien Mitte - Wien Floridsdorf - Stockerau - Hollabrunn
- Wiener Neustadt Hbf - Baden - Mödling - Wien Meidling - Wien Hauptbahnhof - Wien Mitte - Wien Floridsdorf - Stockerau - Absdorf-Hippersdorf - Tullnerfeld
- Laa an der Thaya - Mistelbach - Wolkersdorf - Wien Floridsdorf - Wien Mitte - Wien Rennweg - Flughafen Wien (Vienna Airport) - Wolfsthal
- CAT Wien Mitte - Flughafen Wien (Vienna Airport) at 30-minute intervals

=== U-Bahn ===
Landstraße U-Bahn station is serviced by both U3 and U4 and has 4 platforms. U4 goes north and south of the station whilst U3 goes west and south-east.

- Ottakring - Westbahnhof - Volkstheater - Stephansplatz - Landstraße - Simmering
- Hütteldorf - Längenfeldgasse - Karlsplatz - Landstraße - Schwedenplatz - Schottenring - Spittelau - Heiligenstadt
