= Wien Quartier Belvedere railway station =

Railway station in Vienna, Austria

Wien Quartier Belvedere
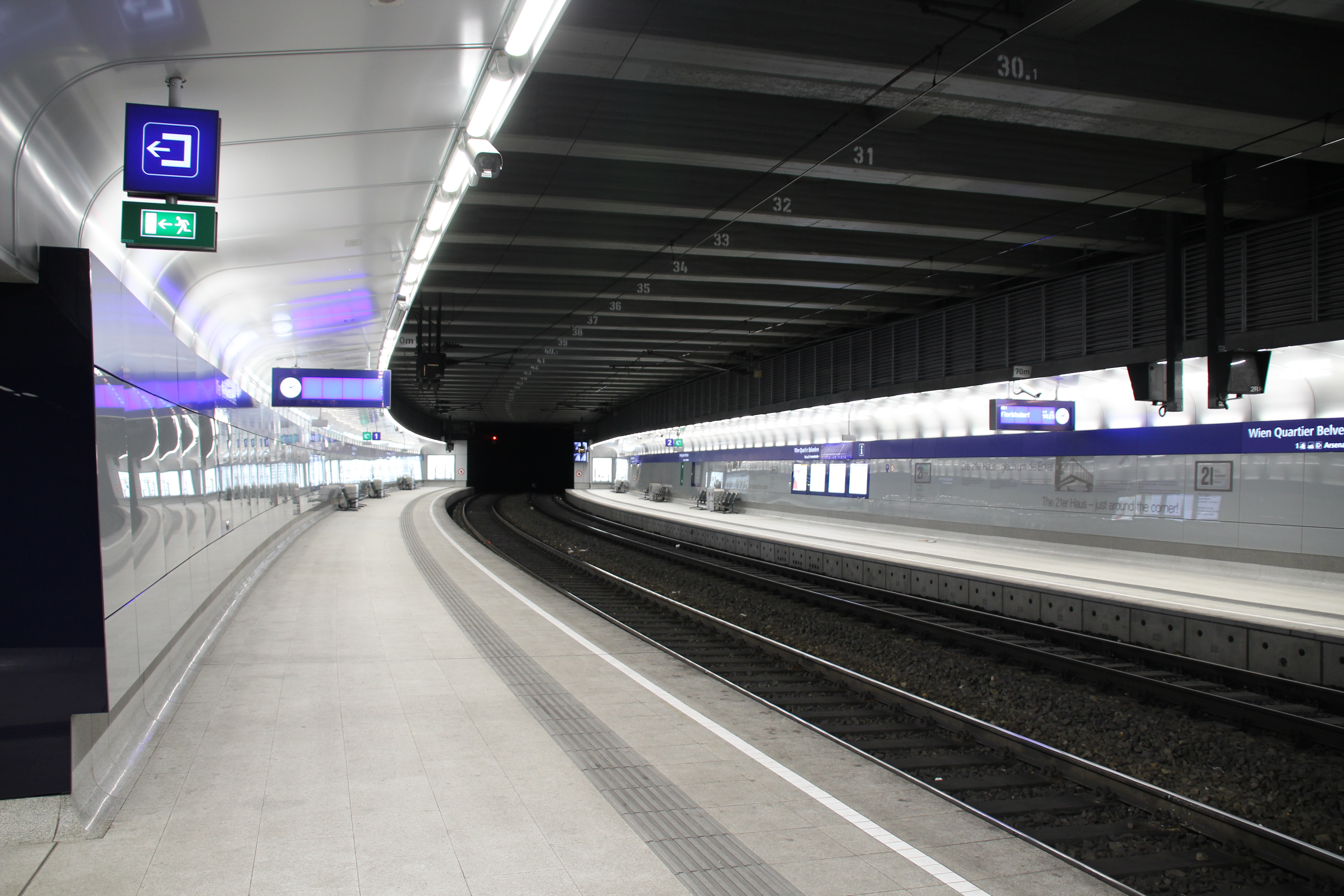

General information
- Location: 1040 Vienna; Austria
- Owner: ÖBB
- Line: Verbindungsbahn
- Platforms: 2 side platforms
- Tracks: 2
- Train operators: ÖBB

History
- Opened: 1962
- Former names: Wien Südbahnhof (S-Bahn) until 2012

Services
Preceding station	Vienna S-Bahn	Following station
Wien Hauptbahnhof towards Wien Meidling	S1	Wien Rennweg towards Marchegg
Wien Hauptbahnhof towards Mödling	S2	Wien Rennweg towards Laa an der Thaya
Wien Hauptbahnhof towards Wiener Neustadt Hbf	S3	Wien Rennweg towards Hollabrunn
Wien Hauptbahnhof towards Wiener Neustadt Hbf	S4	Wien Rennweg towards Absdorf-Hippersdorf
Location

Wien Quartier Belvedere is a railway station in the fourth district of Vienna, served mainly by Vienna S-Bahn services. Opened in 1962 as the new underground S-Bahn platforms of the Südbahnhof main-line terminus, it was renamed to its present name when Südbahnhof was replaced by the new Hauptbahnhof station complex located further west.
