= Wolfsthal =

- Municipality
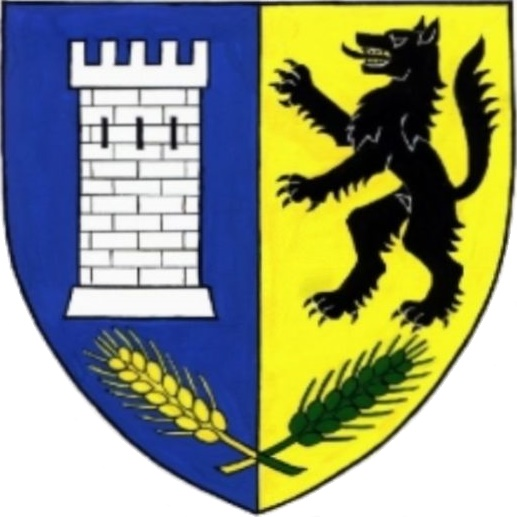
- Coat of arms
- Interactive map of Wolfsthal
- Location within Austria Wolfsthal (Austria)
- Coordinates: 48°8′N 17°0′E
- Country: Austria
- State: Lower Austria
- District: Bruck an der Leitha

Government
  - Mayor: Gerhard Schödinger

Area
  - Total: 21.76 km^{2} (8.40 sq mi)
- Elevation: 150 m (490 ft)

Population (2018-01-01)
  - Total: 1,032
  - Density: 47.43/km^{2} (122.8/sq mi)
- Time zone: UTC+1 (CET)
  - Summer (DST): UTC+2 (CEST)
- Postal code: 2412
- Area code: 02165
- Website: www.wolfsthal.at

Wolfsthal is a town in the district of Bruck an der Leitha in Lower Austria in Austria. It along with neighboring Berg were part of the municipality of Wolfsthal-Berg until 1996. It is the end of the line for S7 Vienna S-Bahn trains.

== Geography ==
The city is located next to the Danube river and Bratislava in Slovakia. It is part of the Industrial Quarter Industrieviertel in Lower Austria. The area of the municipality covers 21.78 square kilometers. 48.31 percent the area is forested.

== History ==
- 1083: First documented mention of Wolfsthal in the Chronicle of Göttweig, Wolfsthal is part of the parish of Hainburg. Whether the place name is from a man named "Wolf" or the animal is not fully understood, a race of animal names is likely to be as old as the field names like "wolf snout" or "Wolf Bruck" suspect.
- 1400: A Jewish settlement grows in Wolfsthal. A synagogue of this period is still preserved in the Upper Street in the former forester's house.
- 1529: The first Turkish assault brings destruction and affliction on Wolfsthal and Pottenburg
- 1544: Otto Wilhelm Walterskirchen and Hundsheim the "Veste Wolfsthal" and the Pottenburg acquires as his own. Both are still in possession of the family Walterskirchen
- 1660: The old, probably originally Romanesque church, is extended, with a dome and a choir.
- 1683: The Plague and the second Turkish attack brought ruin and destruction to Wolfsthal.
- 1710: The church of Wolfsthal become a pilgrimage church. Side aisles are attached and church cemetery is relocated to outside of town.
- 1742: Construction of a school in front of the present church.
- 1805: The invasion of the French brings misery and destruction to Wolfsthal
- 1828: The former Pastor Albert Ressl assigned to write a book "Description of the place Wolfsthal". This book is still missing. The church gets a new, 400-pound bell, which is still in use.
- 1855: The family of Walterskirchen donated a kindergarten, which is later taken over by the state of Lower Austria. Even a home for aged for the employees of the estate farms will be built.
- 1877: The Volunteer Fire Department Wolfsthal is founded.
- 1911: Construction of the Preßburgerbah. Since 1955, the railway terminates in Wolfsthal.
- 1914: The First World War claims 31 victims.
- 1921: The war memorial is built.
- 1922: The sports club is established in Wolfsthal.
- 1925: The glee club is established
- 1928: Wolfsthal is electrified.
- 1938: Annexation of Austria to Nazi Germany
- 1939 -1945: Second World War. In this period 61 inhabitants of Wolfsthal died.
- 1945: Wolfsthal is located in the Russian-occupied zone.
- 1954: Due to prolonged rain protection embankment of the Danube between Bratislava Wolfsthal fail and the Danube threatens to burst into Wolfsthal and Kittsee the emergency is declared.
- 1955: Under Pastor F. Bayer, the church is renovated.
- 1960: Baron Manfred Mautner Markhof acquires badyan Good "Nussau".
- 1965: The water pipe of the town is put into operation, the fire department receives a new vehicle "FK 100".
- 1967: Founding of the band Wolfsthal.
- 1968: The pond near the playground and the farm next to the church is acquired by the municipality.
- 1969: Haunts a devastating hurricane disaster Wolfsthal. Trees are uprooted, the catenary and the rails of Preßburgerbahn severely damaged, blocked the road.
- 1972: Amalgamation of the municipalities Wolfsthal and Berg.
- 1975: The embellishment and Tourism Association is founded and from 1995 as village renewal agreement continued.
- 1989: The iron curtain falls, Wolfsthal is run over by an avalanche of traffic.
- 1992: The biomass heating plant Wolfsthal his farm to take, and thereby contributes significantly to a healthy environment.
- 1993: The neighboring community of Berg is connected to the district heating network of the FWG.
- 1996: The municipalities Wolfsthal and Berg shall be separated via a unanimous council decision again.
- 1997: The "Karl Knaus Park" - an initiative of the village renewal agreement - will be completed, dedicated and has been a popular stop for tourists.
- 1999: Municipal and school will be renovated. The school gets a new workroom.
- 2002: The nearby Danube leads strong floods.
- 2003: Wolfsthal gets officially awarded its new emblem.
- 2007: Concluding a partnership agreement with the community-Vajnory Bratislava, Slovakia.
- 2008: Visitation by Archbishop Cardinal Schönborn, with inauguration of the Youth Centernd - end of 2008 Cardinal Schönborn celebrating an "icy rock worship" with 800 young people in the parish church Wolfsthal.

== Policy ==
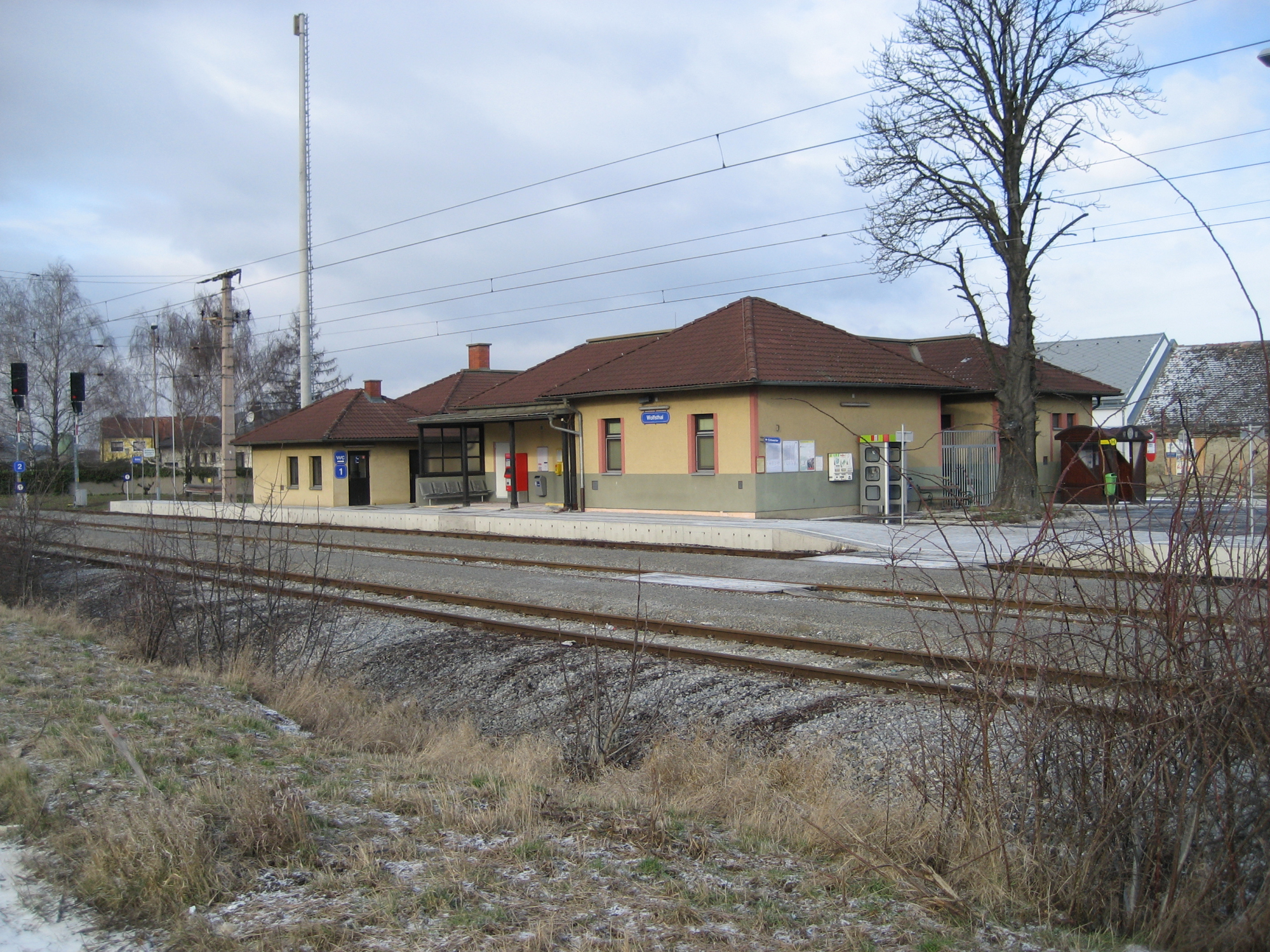
Wolfsthal train station

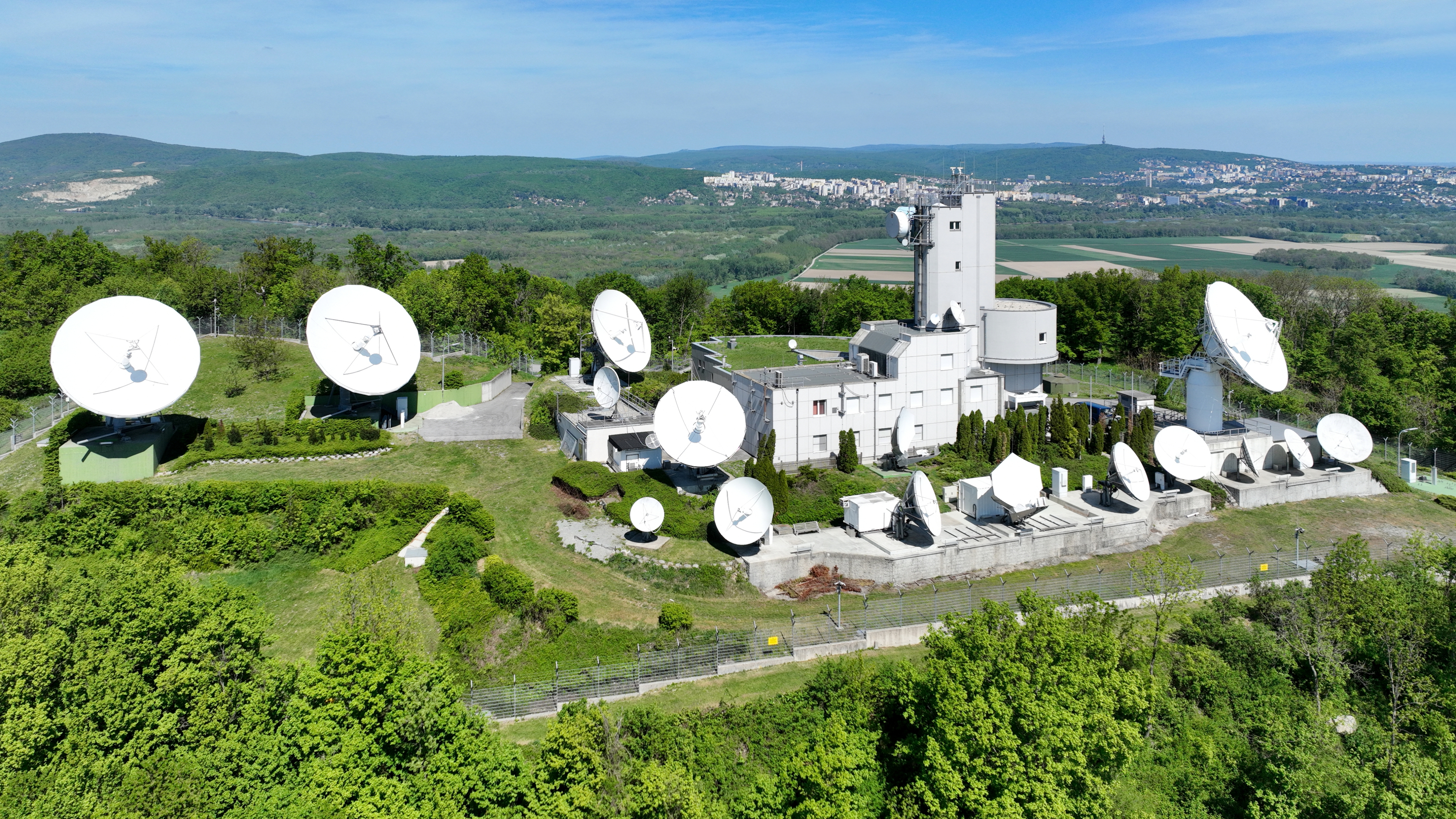
Spy station on the Königswarte

The mayor of the village is Gerhard Schödinger (ÖVP) and chief officer is Thomas Knaus. On 19 September 2007 Gerhard Schödinger won the Centrope Prize for his engagement in social integration of Slovak minority in Wolfsthal.

== Population ==
Historical population
| Year | Pop. | ±% |
|---|---|---|
| 1923 | 1,039 | — |
| 1934 | 921 | −11.4% |
| 1939 | 894 | −2.9% |
| 1951 | 864 | −3.4% |
| 1961 | 802 | −7.2% |
| 1971 | 795 | −0.9% |
| 1973 | 723 | −9.1% |
| 1991 | 711 | −1.7% |
| 2001 | 750 | +5.5% |
| 2009 | 833 | +11.1% |
| 2010 | 849 | +1.9% |
| 2013 | 896 | +5.5% |
| 2014 | 954 | +6.5% |
| 2015 | 947 | −0.7% |
| 2016 | 1,001 | +5.7% |
| 2017 | 1,006 | +0.5% |
| 2018 | 1,032 | +2.6% |
| 2019 | 1,094 | +6.0% |
| 2020 | 1,146 | +4.8% |
