= City Airport Train =

Airport rail link in Vienna, Austria

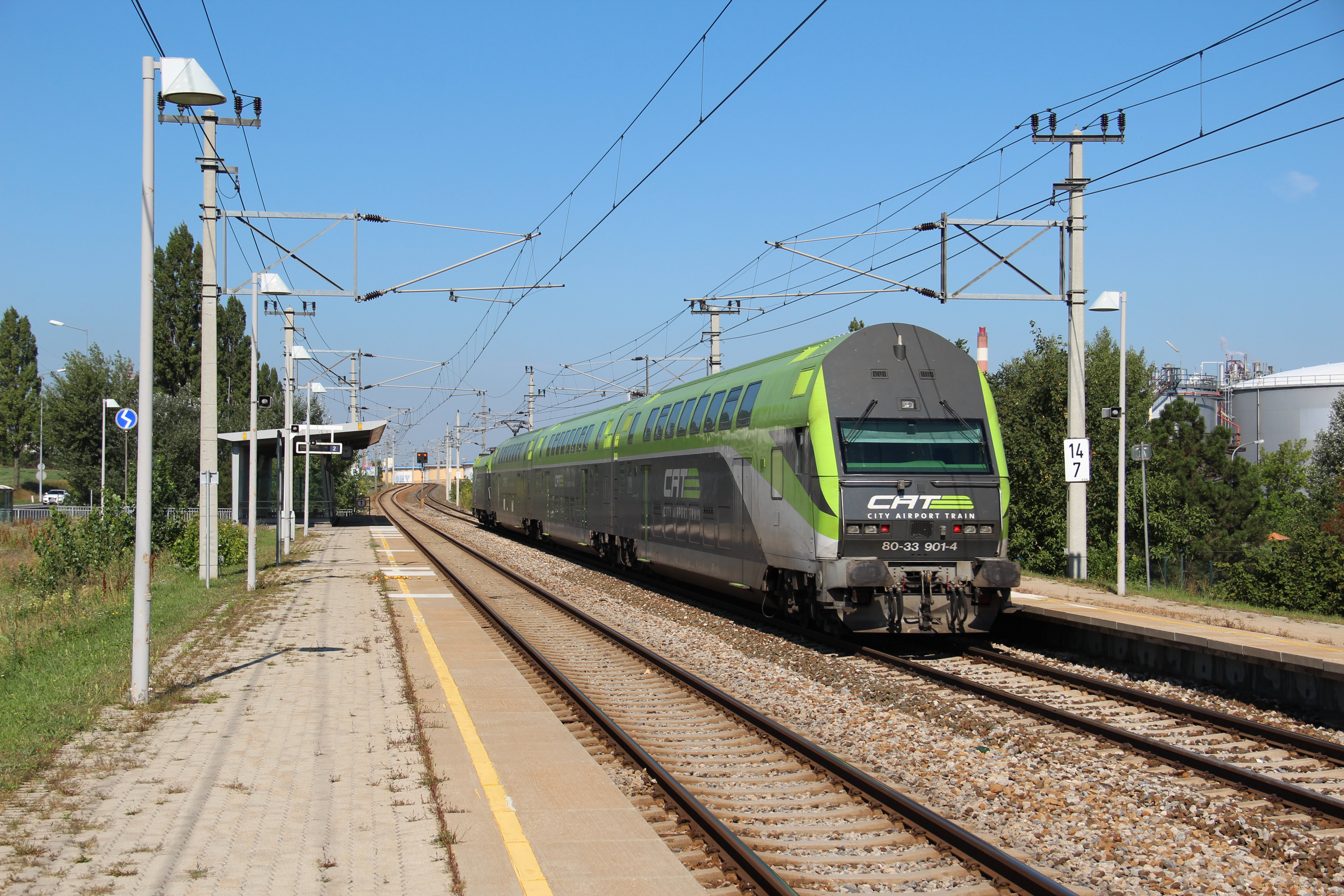
- CAT service in August 2012

Overview
- Service type: Airport rail link
- Locale: Vienna, Austria
- First service: 14 December 2003
- Current operator: ÖBB
- Website: www.cityairporttrain.com

Route
- Termini: Vienna Airport; Wien Mitte
- Distance travelled: 19 kilometres
- Average journey time: 21 minutes
- Service frequency: up to 5 times per hour

Technical
- Rolling stock: ÖBB Class 1016 + 3 Siemens Viaggio Twin double-decker carriages
- Track owner: ÖBB Infra

The City Airport Train (CAT) is an express airport rail link train that operates from Vienna Airport to Wien Mitte in the Vienna city centre. Inaugurated in December 2003, it is operated by ÖBB.

The City Airport Train is temporarily operating with buses during the railway maintenance works, offering reliable non-stop connections up to 5 times per hour between Vienna Airport and Vienna city center (transport hub Wien Mitte). Children under 15 travel for free. It is expected to resume its train service in November 2027 with new rolling stock.

== Operations ==
The CAT is jointly owned by Flughafen Wien (50.1%) and ÖBB (49.9%). Operations commenced on 14 December 2003.

== Previous and new rolling stock ==
Each CAT set consists of three bilevel Siemens Viaggio Twin carriages hauled in push-pull configuration by a monosystem ÖBB Class 1016 locomotive. Previously, multisystem ÖBB Class 1014 and ÖBB Class 1116 locomotives were used.

In 2027, three new Stadler Kiss bilevel EMUs will replace the existing rolling stock.
