= S7 (Vienna) =

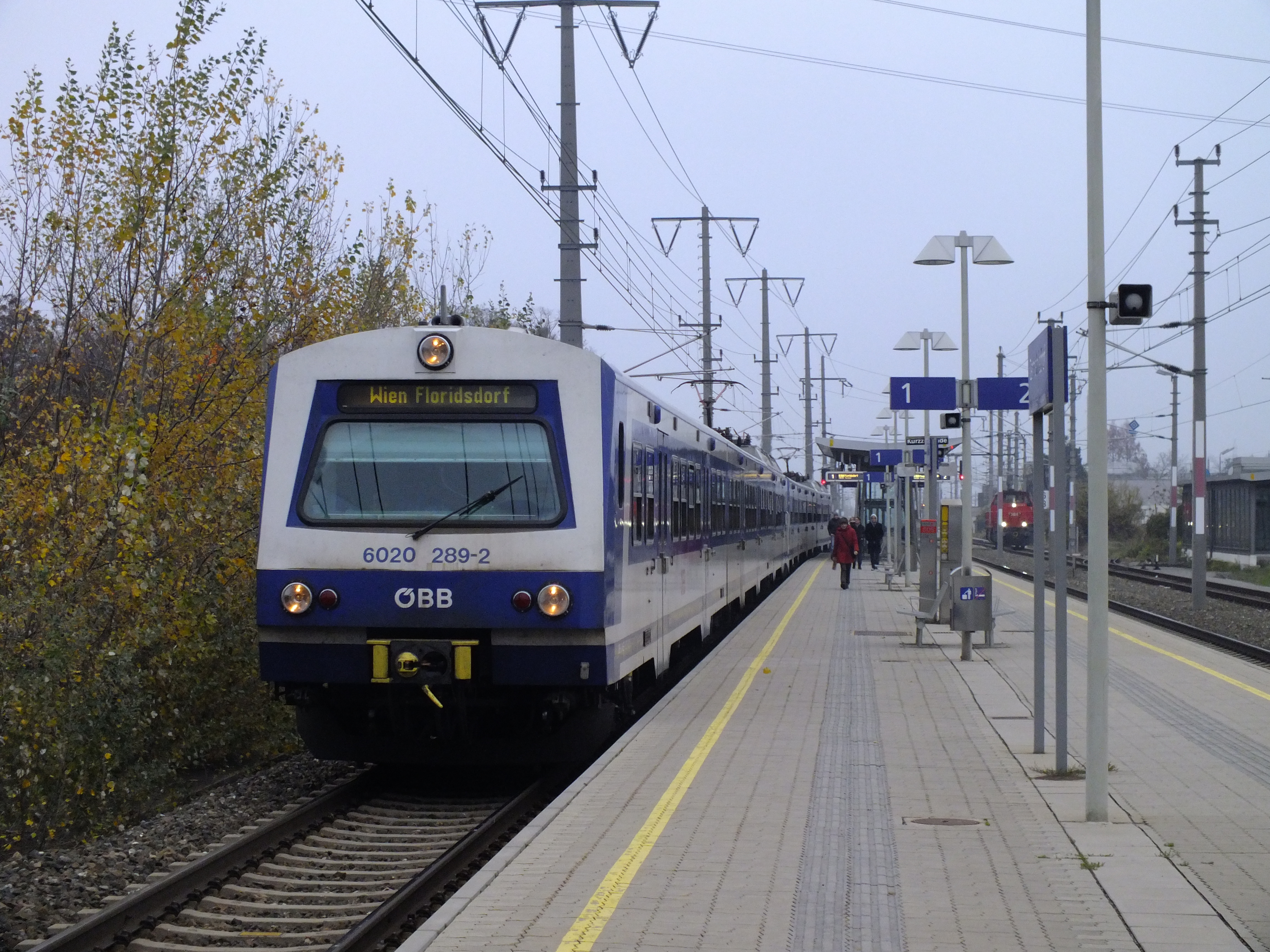
- A Floridsdorf bound train at Wien Zentralfriedhof.

Overview
- Status: Operating
- Owner: ÖBB
- Locale: Vienna
- Termini: Laa an der Thaya/Mistelbach/Wien Floridsdorf railway station; Flughafen Wien/Wolfsthal
- Stations: 47

Service
- Type: Commuter rail
- System: Vienna S-Bahn

History
- Opened: 24 May 1998

Technical
- Track gauge: 1,435 mm (4 ft 8 1/2 in) standard gauge

S7 is an electrified commuter rail service operating between Floridsdorf and Vienna International Airport, with extended eastbound service to Wolfsthal in the greater Vienna area and northbound service to Laa an der Thaya, sometimes ending in Wolkersdorf and Mistelbach. Between Wien Mitte and the airport, S7 provides local service on the route while the City Airport Train provides non stop express service to the airport. The S7 uses the former Aspangbahn right-of-way in the city center then, at Kledering, transitions to the former Pressburger Bahn, which connected Vienna and Bratislava, to Wolfsthal. Average travel time between Floridsdorf and Vienna International Airport is 37 minutes.

== Route ==
The S7 uses the right of way of the former Aspang and Pressburger railways as well as the Vienna Trunk Line, in the city center. The line begins at Laa an der Thaya, far in the north of Lower Austria, then comes to Vienna, stopping at Wien Floridsdorf in Northern Vienna, crosses the Danube on the Northern Railway Bridge, and continues along the Trunk Line to Wien Rennweg keeping just east of Vienna's historical city center. After Rennweg, the route diverges off the Trunk Line and transitions to the former Aspang Railway right of way. After passing Kledering marshalling yard, the route briefly connects to the Danube Overland Railway, via a flying junction. Past Wien Kaiserebersdorf, the route switches to the Pressburger railway, again via a flying junction.

A fire in Praterstern in August 2026 restricted the line to between Geiselbergstraße to the airport until 7 September 2026. After that, because of renovation works unrelated to the fire, it only operates from the airport to St. Marx until October 2027, with the section between St. Marx and Praterstern being closed.
