= Floridsdorfer Hochbahn =

Railway line in Austria

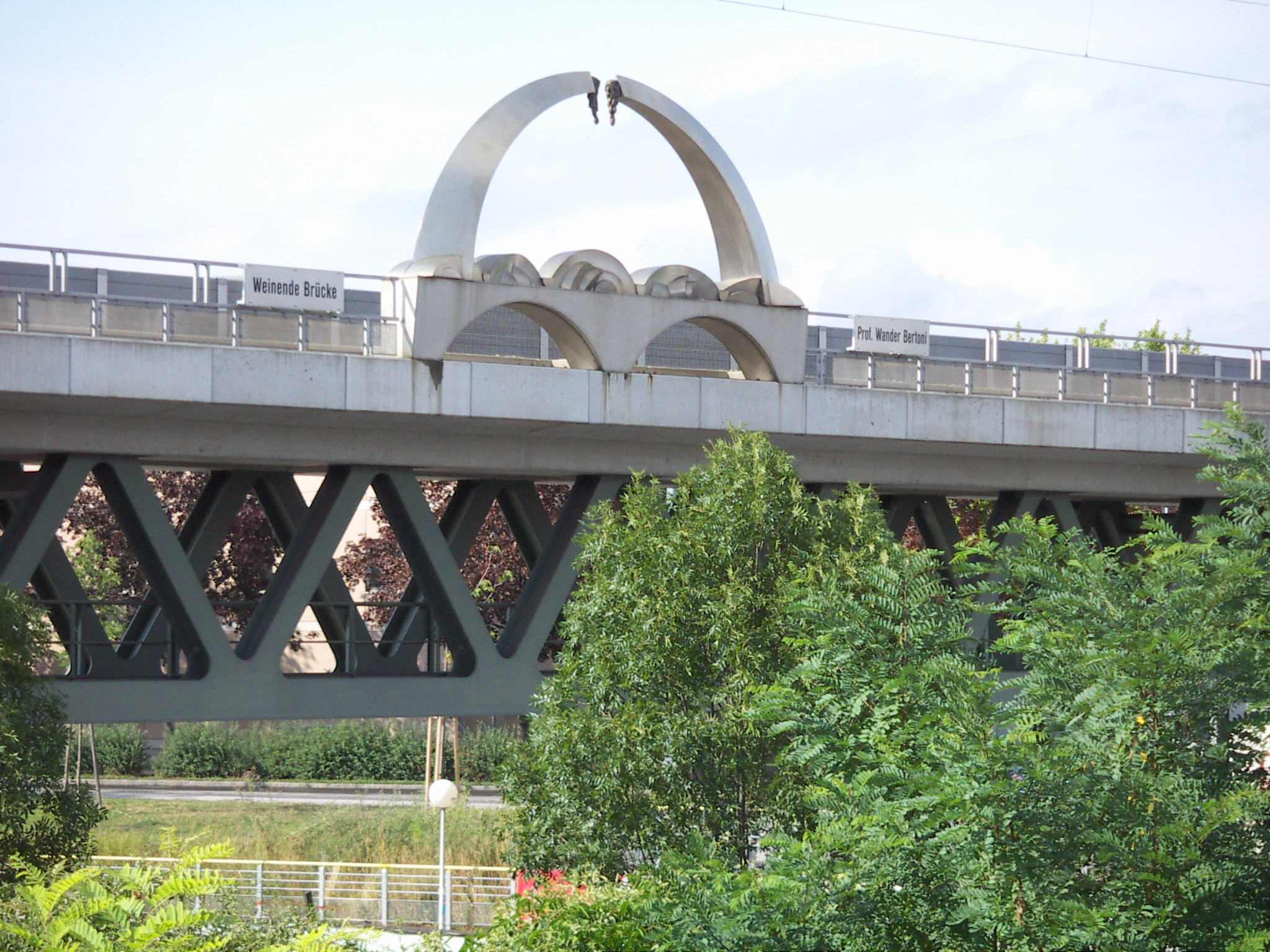
- The "Weeping Bridge," designed by Wander Bertoni

Overview
- Line number: 138 01

History
- Opened: 1 December 1916

Technical
- Line length: 4.4 km (2.7 mi)
- Number of tracks: 1
- Track gauge: 1,435 mm (4 ft 8 1/2 in) standard gauge
- Electrification: 15 kV 16.7 Hz AC
Route map
- Source

The Floridsdorfer Hochbahn (lit. 'Floridsdorf high line'), also known as the Italian Loop, is a freight-only railway line in Austria. It runs 4.4 kilometres (2.7 mi) between Wien Jedlersdorf and Wien Leopoldau, connecting the Northwest railway line and North railway line.

== Route ==
The northwest end of Floridsdorfer Hochbahn is at Wien Jedlersdorf on the Northwest railway line. The line proceeds eastward over elevated tracks through Floridsdorf, eventually crossing over the North railway line approximately 440 metres (1,440 ft) east of Wien Siemensstraße. The line joins with the North railway line at Wien Leopoldau.

== History ==
Planning for a connecting line between the North and Northwest railway lines began before World War I, but assumed a heightened importance as military rail traffic grew in Vienna. Construction work began in May 1916, with the line opening for traffic on 1 December of the same year. Thousands of Italian prisoners of war from the Sigmundsherberg prisoner of war camp worked on the line, leading to the nickname "Italian Loop."

The line was bombed several times during World War II and wrecked by retreating German forces during the 1945 Vienna offensive. Rebuilding the line following the war was not practical because of the postwar shortage of building materials. Reconstruction of the line finally began on 2 September 1996. Service resumed on 29 May 1999.
