= Leopoldau =

Leopoldau may refer to:

- Leopoldau, Vienna, a subdistrict of Floridsdorf in Vienna, Austria
- Leopoldau (Vienna U-Bahn), a station on line U1
- Wien Leopoldau railway station
