= Wien Traisengasse railway station =

Railway station in Vienna, Austria

Wien Traisengasse
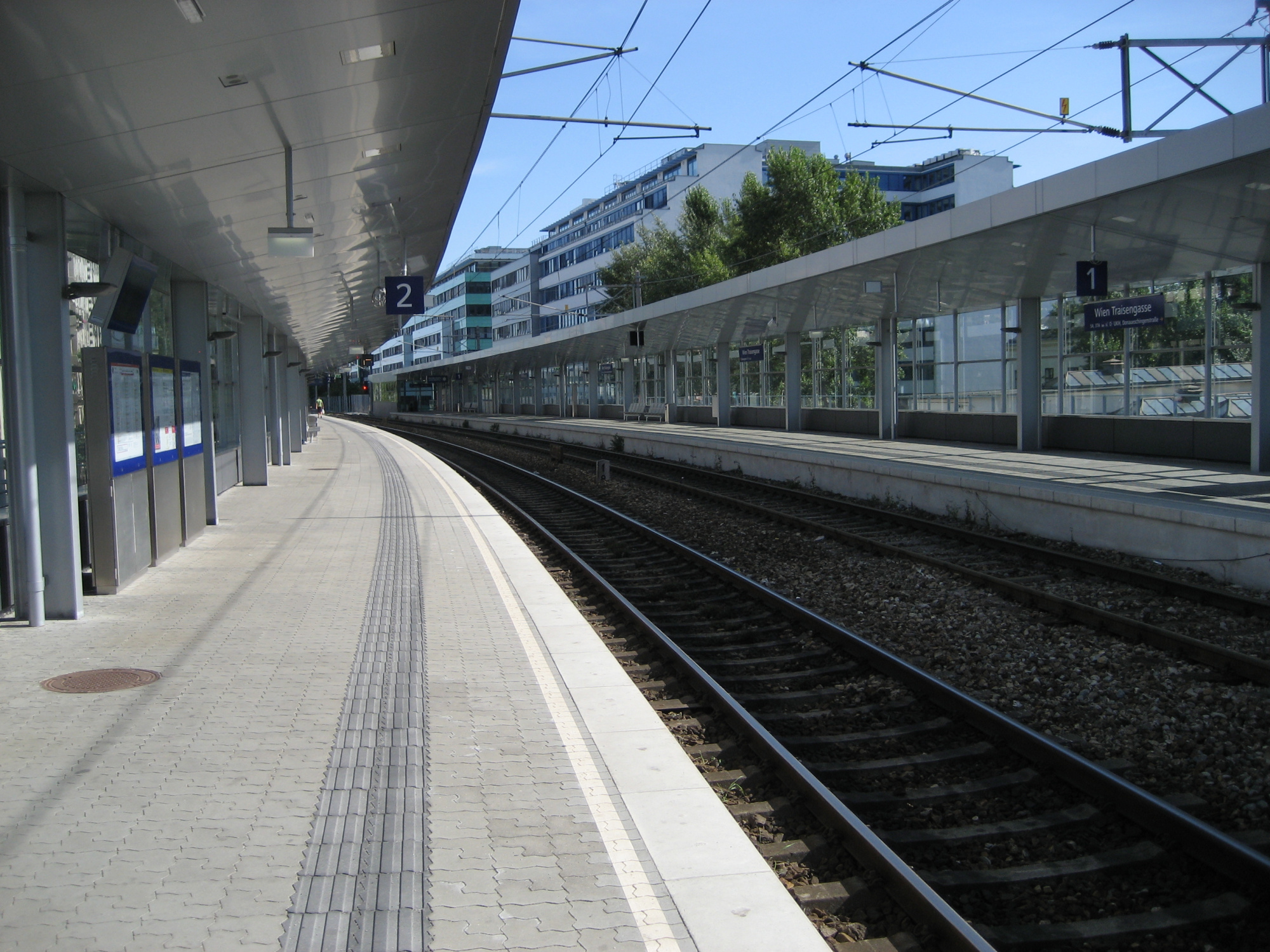

General information
- Location: 1200 Vienna; Austria
- Coordinates: 48°14′04″N 16°23′01″E
- Owner: ÖBB
- Operator: ÖBB
- Platforms: 2 side
- Tracks: 2

Services
Preceding station	Vienna S-Bahn	Following station
Wien Praterstern towards Wien Meidling	S1	Wien Handelskai towards Marchegg
Wien Praterstern towards Mödling	S2	Wien Handelskai towards Laa an der Thaya
Wien Praterstern towards Wiener Neustadt Hbf	S3	Wien Handelskai towards Hollabrunn
Wien Praterstern towards Wiener Neustadt Hbf	S4	Wien Handelskai towards Absdorf-Hippersdorf
Wien Praterstern towards Wolfsthal	S7	Wien Handelskai towards Laa an der Thaya
Location
- Location within Austria

Wien Traisengasse is a railway station serving Brigittenau, the twentieth district of Vienna.
