= Wien Floridsdorf railway station =

Railway station in Vienna, Austria

Wien Floridsdorf
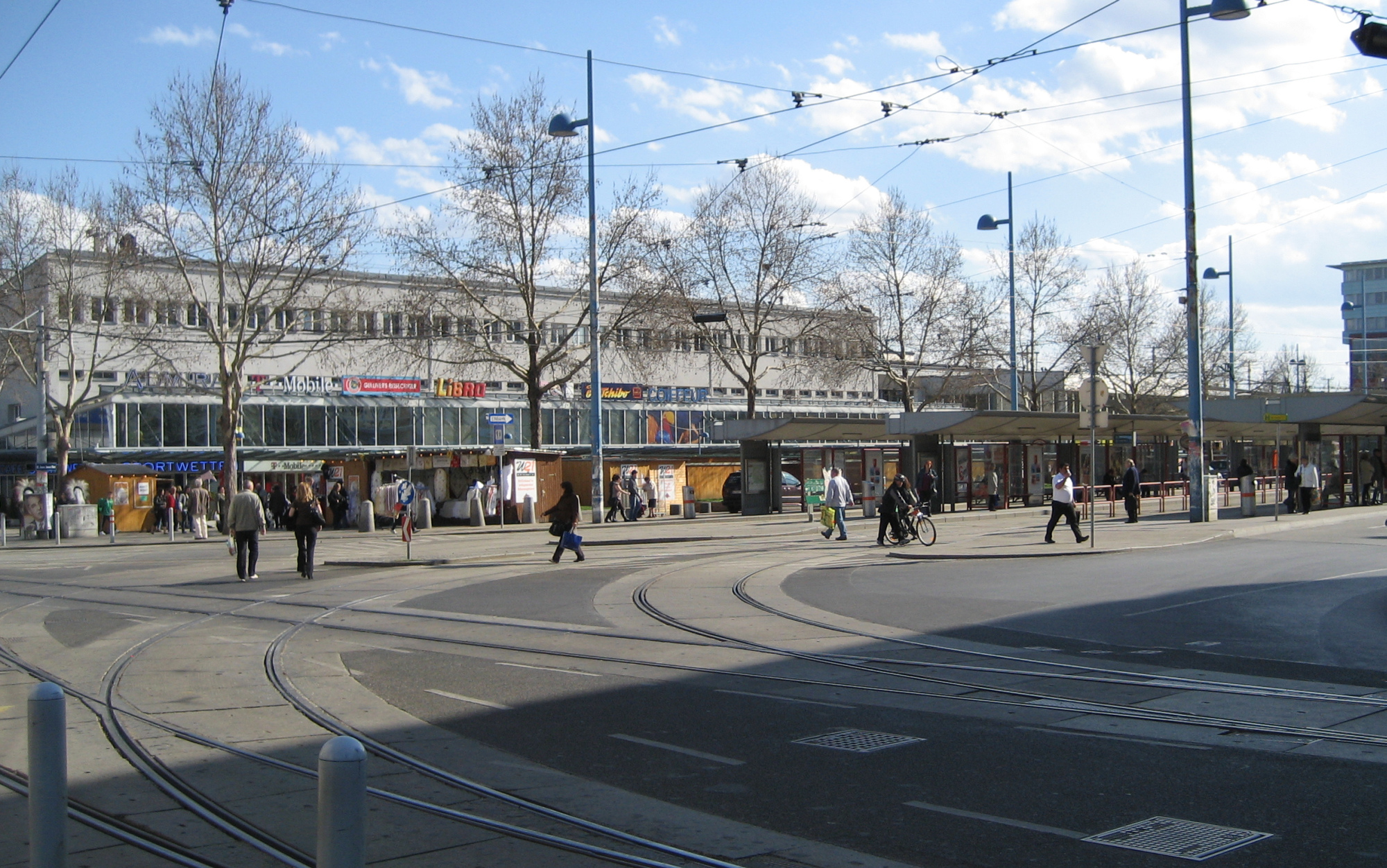

General information
- Location: Franz-Jonas-Platz; A-1210 Wien; Austria
- Coordinates: 48°15′23″N 16°24′00″E
- Owner: Austrian Federal Railways (ÖBB)
- Operator: Austrian Federal Railways (ÖBB)
- Lines: North railway line; Northwest railway line
- Connections: U-Bahn: Tram: 25, 26, 27, 30, 31; Bus: 29A, 29B, 33A, 34A, N20, N29, N31, Regional buses

History
- Opened: 1961

Services
Preceding station	Vienna S-Bahn	Following station
Wien Handelskai towards Wien Meidling	S1	Wien Siemensstraße towards Marchegg
Wien Handelskai towards Mödling	S2	Wien Siemensstraße towards Laa an der Thaya
Wien Handelskai towards Wiener Neustadt Hbf	S3	Wien Brünner Straße towards Hollabrunn
Wien Handelskai towards Wiener Neustadt Hbf	S4	Wien Brünner Straße towards Absdorf-Hippersdorf
Wien Handelskai towards Wolfsthal	S7	Wien Siemensstraße towards Laa an der Thaya
Location
- Location within Austria

Wien Floridsdorf (German for Vienna Floridsdorf) is a railway station located in the Floridsdorf district of Vienna, Austria. Opened in 1961, it is owned and operated by the Austrian Federal Railways (ÖBB), and is served by both regional and S-Bahn trains.

Underneath the station is the Floridsdorf U-Bahn station, which is the northeastern terminus of U6 of the Vienna U-Bahn.
