= Wien Handelskai railway station =

Railway station in Vienna, Austria

Wien Handelskai
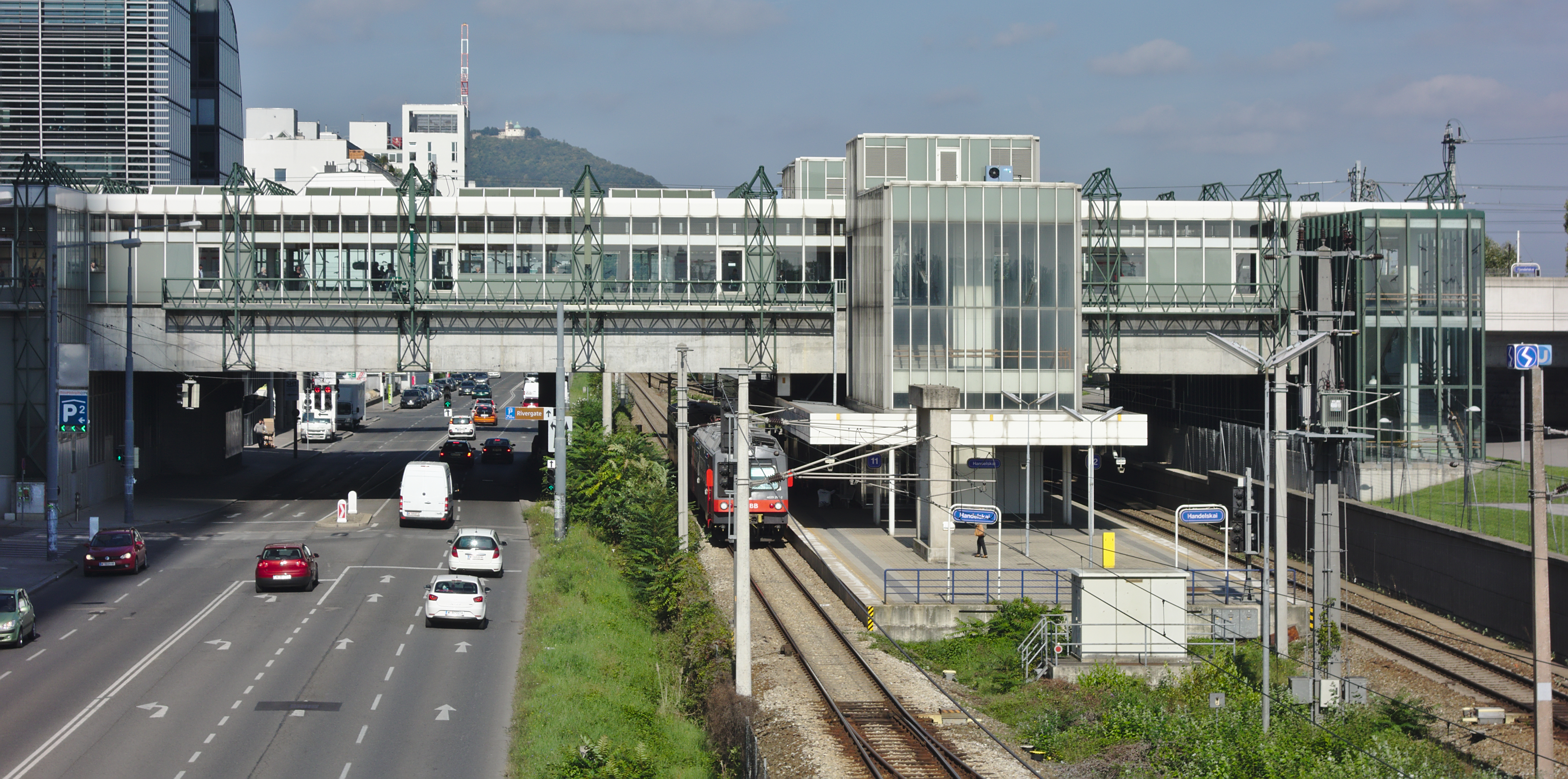

General information
- Location: 1200 Vienna; Austria
- Coordinates: 48°14′31″N 16°23′07″E
- Owner: ÖBB, Wiener Linien
- Operator: ÖBB, Wiener Linien
- Lines: Nordbahn; Donauuferbahn
- Platforms: 2 side 1 island
- Tracks: 4

History
- Opened: 1996

Services
Preceding station	Vienna S-Bahn	Following station
Wien Traisengasse towards Wien Meidling	S1	Wien Floridsdorf towards Marchegg
Wien Traisengasse towards Mödling	S2	Wien Floridsdorf towards Laa an der Thaya
Wien Traisengasse towards Wiener Neustadt Hbf	S3	Wien Floridsdorf towards Hollabrunn
Wien Traisengasse towards Wiener Neustadt Hbf	S4	Wien Floridsdorf towards Absdorf-Hippersdorf
Wien Traisengasse towards Wolfsthal	S7	Wien Floridsdorf towards Laa an der Thaya
Wien Heiligenstadt towards Wien Hütteldorf	S45	Terminus
Location
- Location within Austria

Wien Handelskai is a railway and metro interchange station serving Brigittenau, the twentieth district of Vienna.

The platform for the S45 are on the lower level while platforms for the S1, S2, S3, S4, and S7 are on the upper level, adjacent to the U-Bahn platforms.
