= Wien Nordwestbahnhof =

Railway station in Vienna, Austria

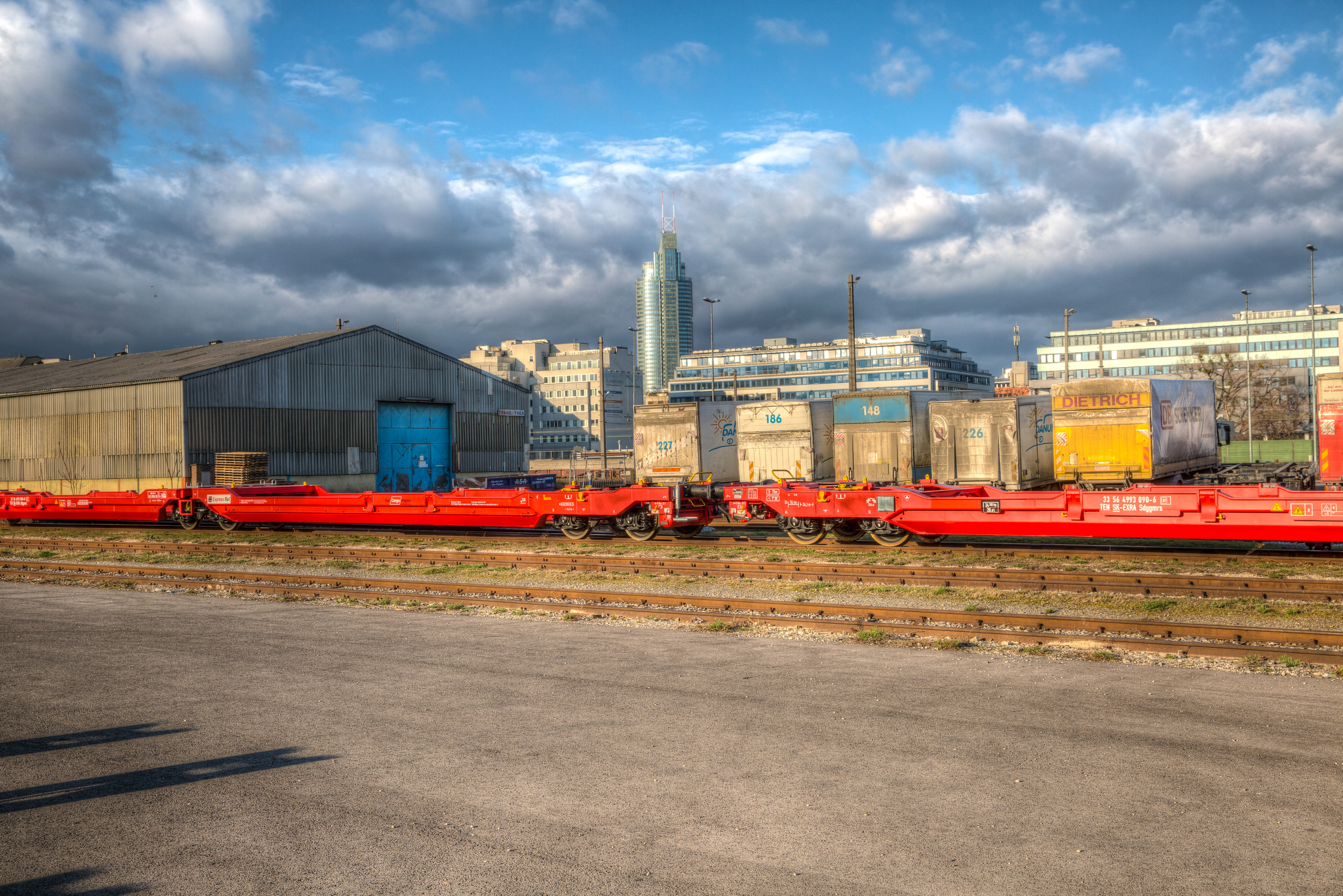
- Wien Nordwestbahnhof in 2013

General information
- Location: Vienna-Brigittenau; Austria
- Coordinates: 48°13′47″N 16°22′59″E
- Owner: Austrian Federal Railways (ÖBB)
- Tracks: 5

Construction
- Structure type: at-grade

History
- Opened: June 1, 1872; 154 years ago
Location

The Wien Nordwestbahnhof (English: Vienna Northwest Railway Station), abbreviated as Wien NWBH, is the site of a goods station in Brigittenau district of Vienna, Austria. Passenger transport ended in 1959. It served as the southern terminus of the Austrian Northwestern Railway. The northwestern terminus of the line was Prague Těšnov station till 1972. Freight transport is the process of termination. Starting in 2018, the site is being redeveloped into a residential district.

== Station premises ==
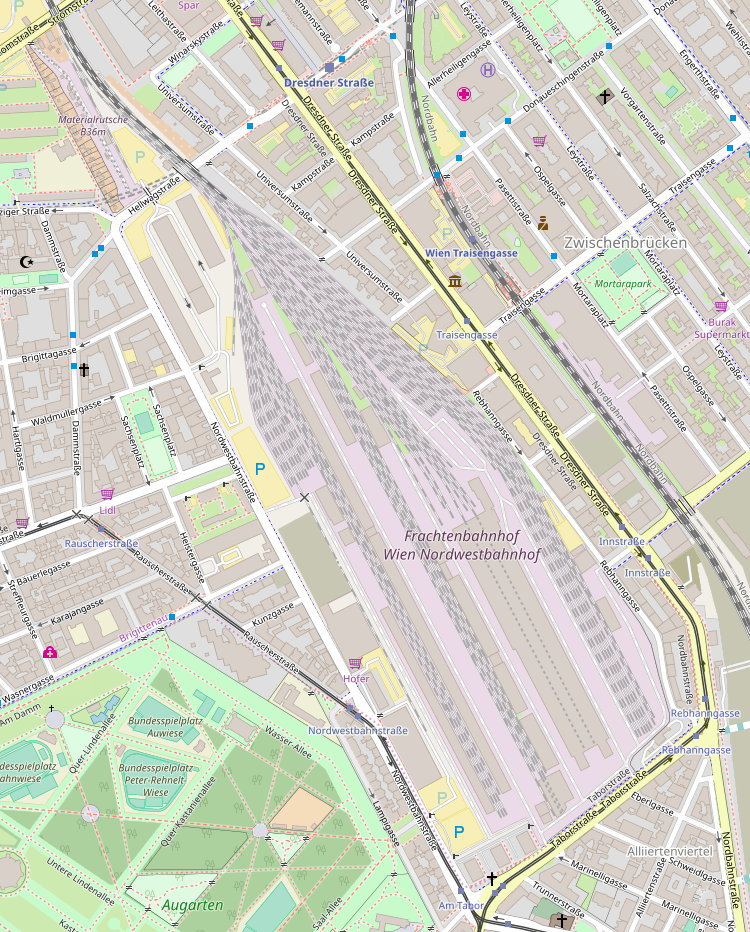
Northwest Station 2017

The Northwest Railway Station is hardly anchored in the general awareness although being the second-largest railway station of the formerly six Viennese terminus stations. The Northwest Railway lost its importance due to the dissolution of Austria-Hungary. Passenger traffic was already stopped in 1952 after a phase as a replacement station. Only the remaining post office was known in 1200, the former main post office of Brigittenau on the side of the Nordwestbahnstraße. The railway station has gone down in the history of Vienna rather as the scene of political events.

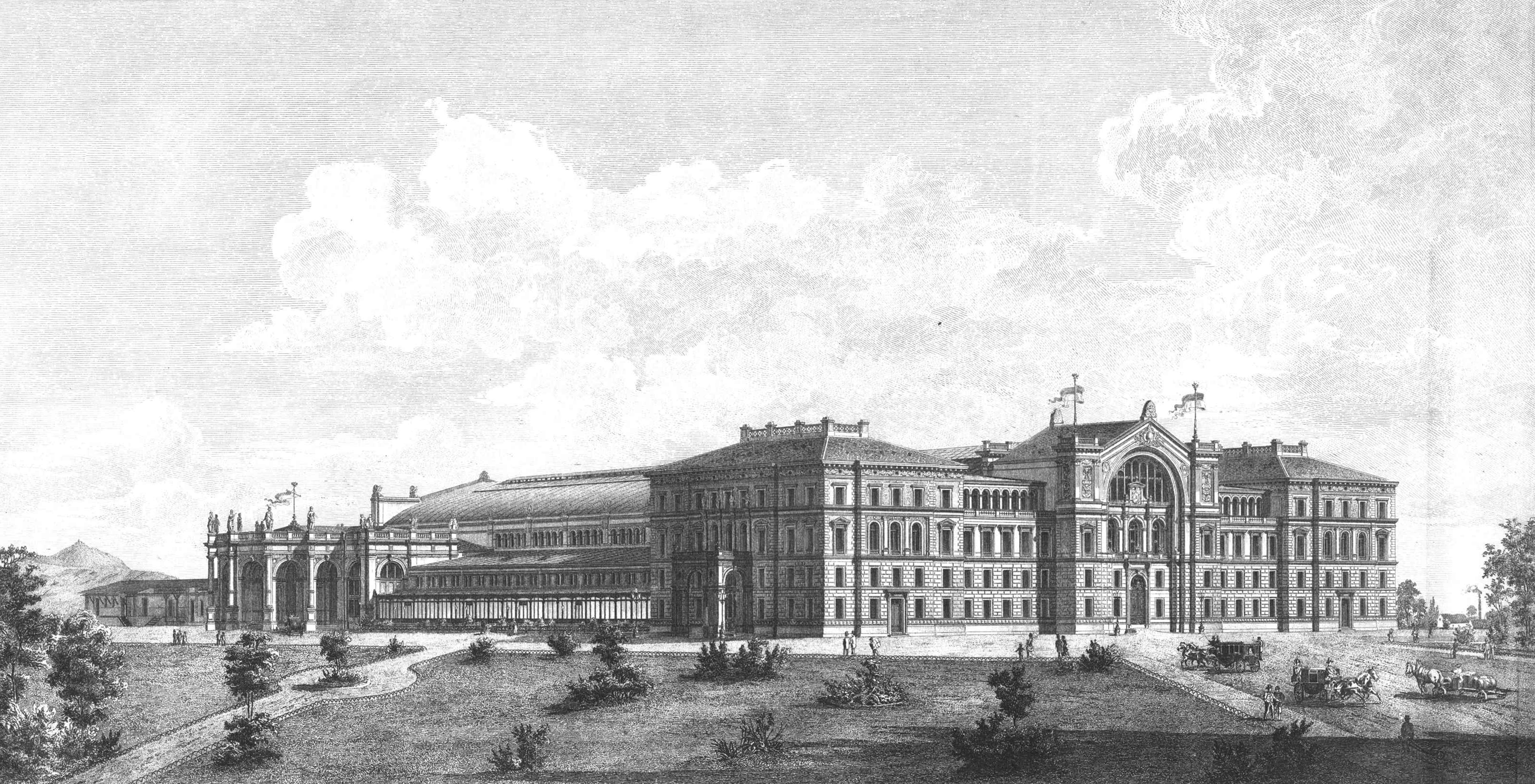
1873

The railway station is only about four kilometres from the centre of Vienna and since 1900 part of the 20th district. The site borders on Taborstraße in the south, Nordwestbahnstraße in the west, Dresdnerstraße in the east and Stromstrasse in the north. The main entrance to the site is currently located in the Tabor- and Nordwestbahnstraße. The area is the last large urban development area of Vienna. The area is 44 hectares. In the middle, a green park of 10 hectares is to be created. Approximately 800,000 m^{2} of gross floor space is to be created here by 2030. The urban development model has been completed and initial property sales to developers are expected in 2020/21. The deindustrialization of the city opens up space for a new, more modern use of space in the inner city area.

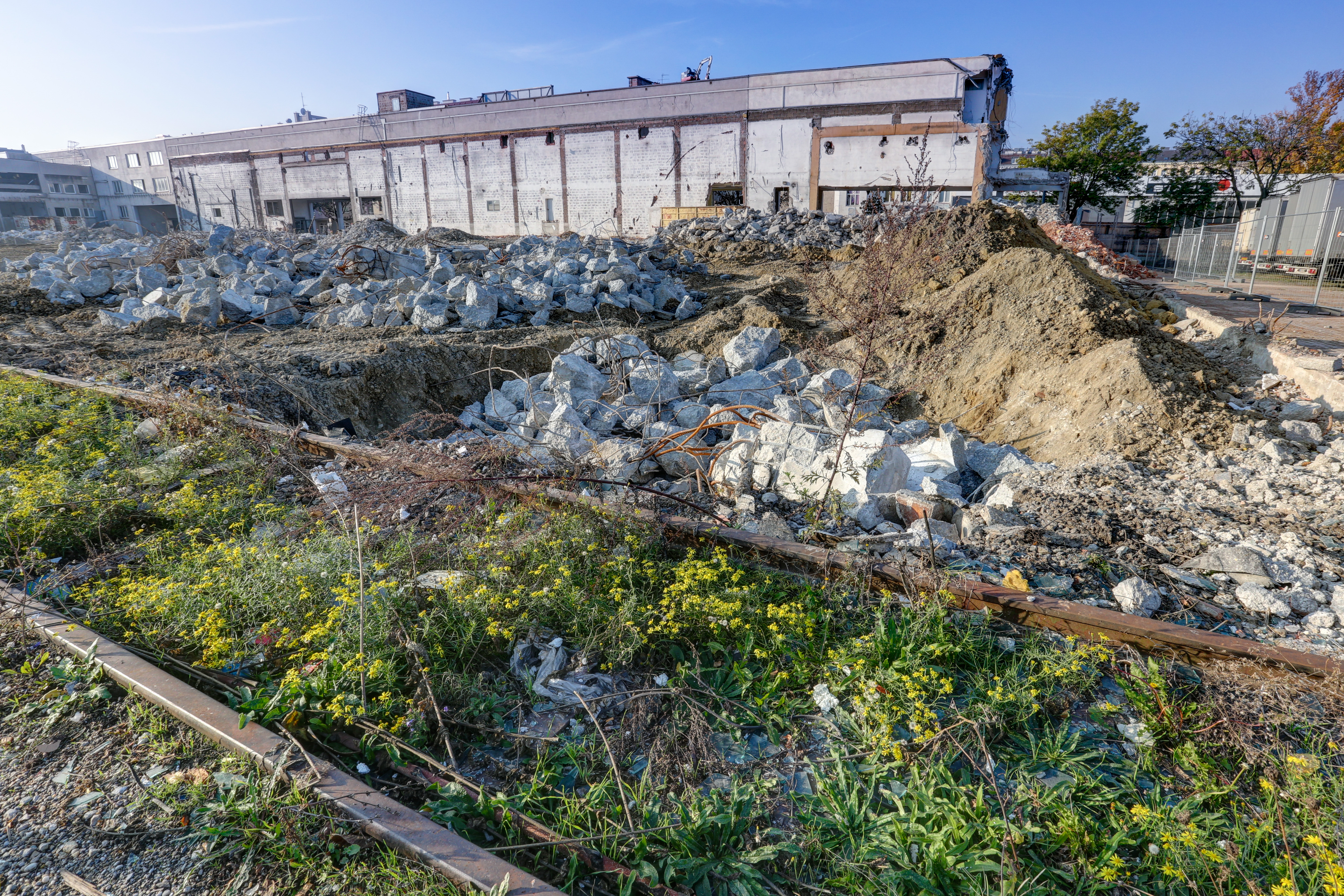
First demolition 2015

The use as a railway station and transshipment point for goods is on the way out. The landowner Austrian Federal Railways (ÖBB) only awards short-term contracts. All contracts with tenants and subtenants will expire at the end of 2017 to begin demolition of the site for the construction of a new urban development area. In the north of the railway station on Nordwestbahnstraße still exists a large operating garage, which is used by various companies formerly from such as ÖBB-Postbus or the private bus company Gschwindl, as well as driving schools and the fire department.

== Time before the railway ==
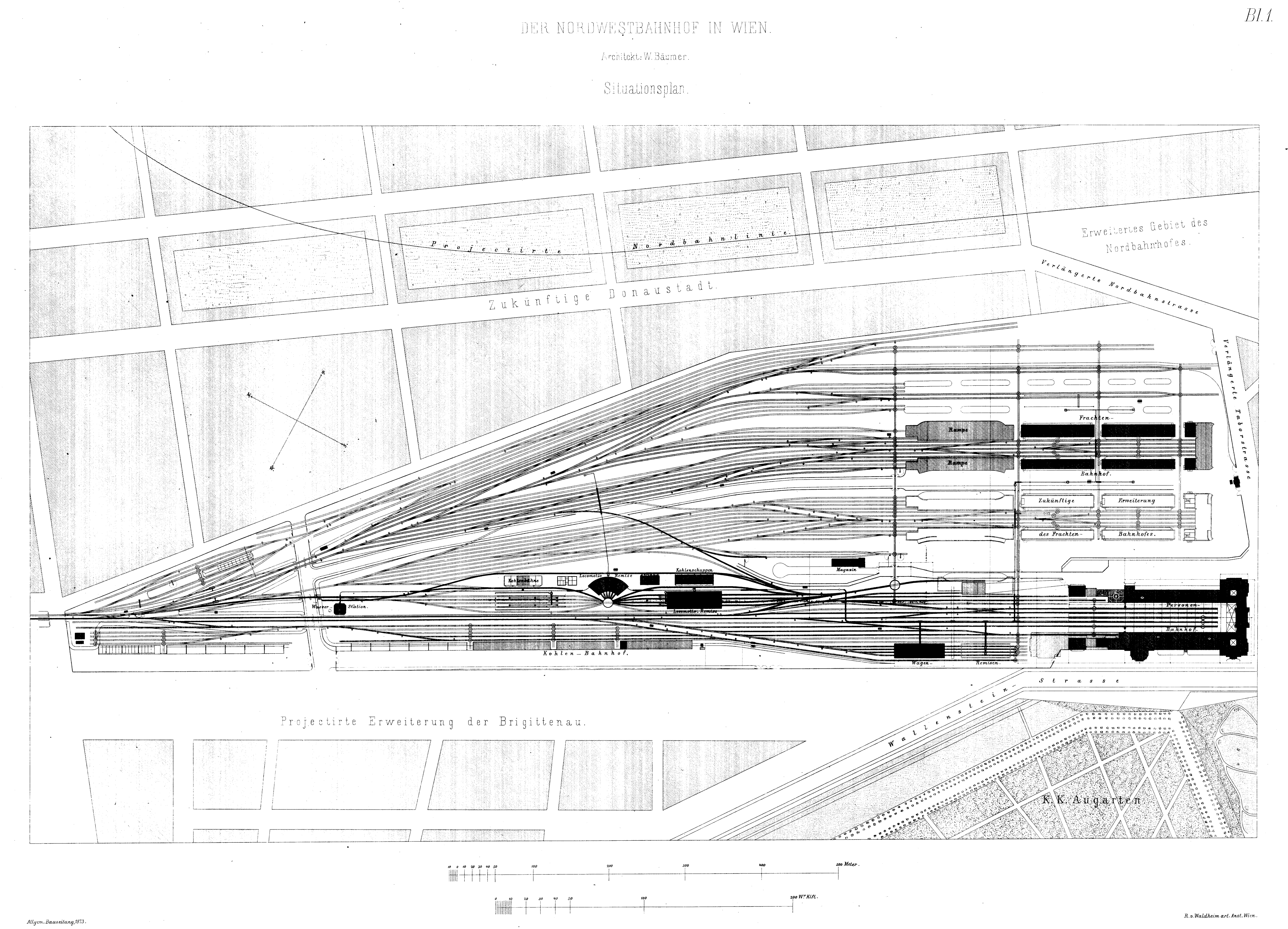
Planning Stage 1873

In the period before the regulation of the winding Danube, the territory was still unspoilt because of the recurring floods. In 1614, Emperor Matthias had built a small castle for hunting in the Wolfsau (older name of Brigittenau), a part of the former imperial hunting area, which at that time was still an untouched landscape. The area was not only unsafe because of the water, but also military. During the Second Vienna Turkish siege in 1683, the facilities in Augarten were destroyed.

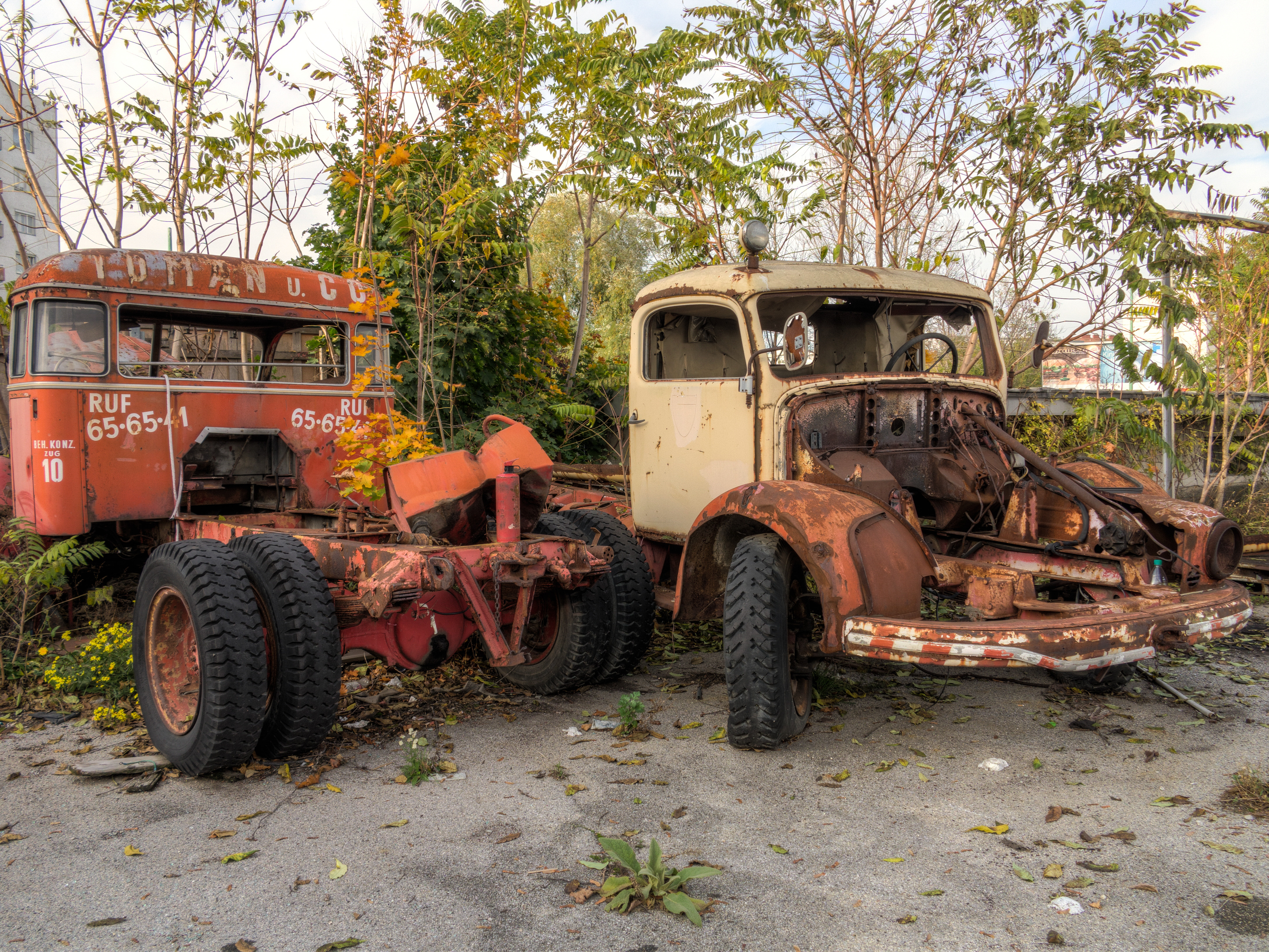
Vintage car trucks (evacuated around 2015)

The growth of the city of Vienna also made the tributaries of the river more important for shipping. The station grounds are located in the Fahnenstangenwasser, a filled in arm of the Danube. At this branch of the Danube timber delivered via the river was unloaded. The flagpoles showed the landing stages to the ships and rafts. The site was a peripheral area of the Augarten belonging to the 2nd district. At that time, the Nordwestbahnstraße was still called Augartendamm. The branch of the Danube disappeared with the regulation of the Danube from 1868 onwards. Thus land was won for the station and industrial companies. In the middle of the 19th century due to the lower taxes and the lack of space, public amusement opportunities were established outside the city walls. The area was also popular for carrying out illegal dogfights of rich industrial sons. There were also large amusement centres. The most famous was the "Universum". The owner Ferdinand Bachmaier (1826-1903) demanded the enormous sum of 100,000 florins as compensation for the railway construction.

== Construction of the railway station ==
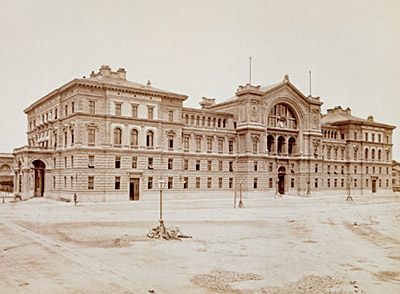
Main facade shortly after completion in 1873

The fact that such a large infrastructure project as the construction of the Northwest Railway was financed privately must be seen against the background of the public finances of Austria-Hungary. Due to the heavily strained state budget in the years around the Austro-Prussian War of 1866 and the boycott of tax increases by the Imperial Council, which was dominated by the nobility, the state sold existing railway lines to private investors and promoted the expansion and new construction with guaranteed interest for shares.

Subsequently, the railways were intensively expanded, including the Northwest Railway, but also through share speculation by competing railway companies. Not only the regulation of the Danube river, but also the forthcoming Vienna World's Fair in 1873 led to a violent building speculation at the time of the station construction. The financing model ultimately did not bring any relief for the state budget, but rather enormously increased the costs. Nationalization was the only way out. The Nordwestbahn was built by the Imperial Royal Austrian State Railways from October 15, 1909.

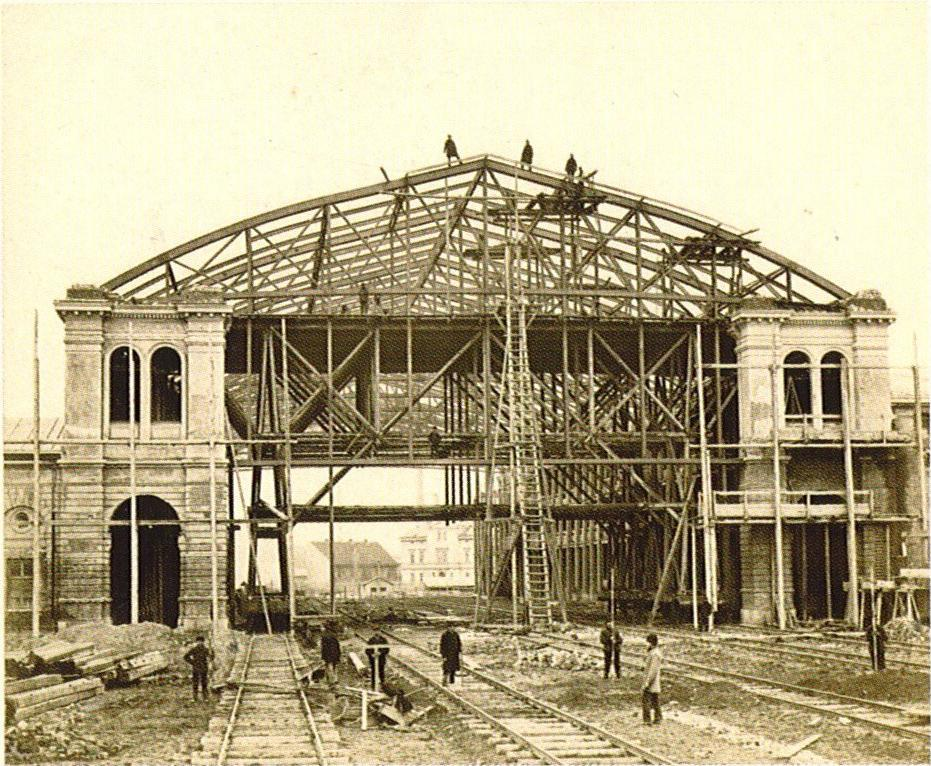
Railway entrance portal in construction, 1871

In the first planning phase around 1869, the project was the subject of numerous political and technical discussions. The focus was on the location between the regulated Danube river and Danube Canal, the elevation of the terrain and crossings for the local residents. Discussion points were how far the groundwater has to be taken into account, as the level of construction work has a significant impact on construction costs. Another point was the number and dimensions of the passageways underneath the station. The structure was initially intended for the western (back) part of the Augarten, but this location would have hindered the connection between the Danube main stream and the city more than the finally selected location. In mid-June 1869, a solution could be found next to the Taborstrasse, after complete reworking of the project.

== Main Reception Building ==
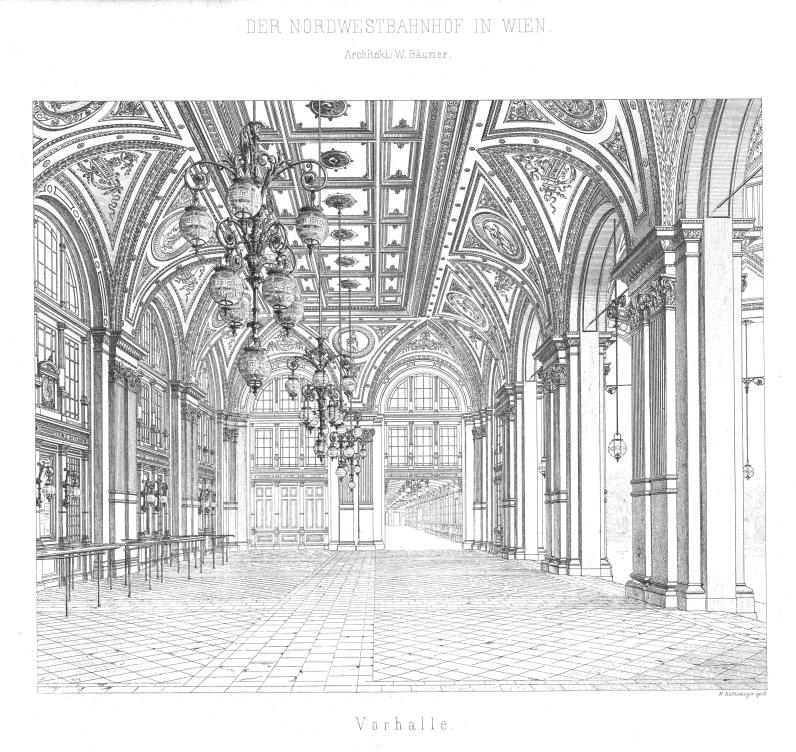
Draft Reception area 1873

Stuttgart professor of architecture Wilhelm Sophonias Bäumer was commissioned by the Northwest Railway Construction Department to build the passenger station, after he had been invited to submit a draft in 1869. The specification was a station with five tracks, which can be extended if required. It was not yet clear how the northwest railway would develop. Construction of the hall began in January 1870, with Bäumer being supported in the construction phase until 1873 by Theodor Reuter as site manager, who at that time was chief engineer in the central office for building construction of the Northwest Railway. Bäumer, who moved his residence to Vienna for the project, also developed large residential buildings in the vicinity (Heinestraße 41 / Praterstern 1 / Kleine Stadtgutgasse 12 and 14) as well as some villas in the surrounding area of Vienna and Carinthia during the construction supervision for the construction of the railway station.

The Nordwestbahnhof, the main work of Bäumer, was stylistically inspired by the shapes of Italian Renaissance palaces. In this project, he was able to consistently implement his stylistic ideas in both exterior and interior design. The imposing, monumental and highly regarded building was reminiscent of older station buildings in Paris. The main façade was structured by Risalite. The central main entrance was accentuated by arcades, a large semicircular window and a gable roofing reminiscent of a city gate. On the departure side at the Nordwestbahnstraße there was an elegant spacious semicircular vestibule. On this allegorical figures for the cities were placed, which have moved by the northwest runway closer to how. These were Dresden, Leipzig, Breslau, Berlin, Hamburg and Bremen. There were also four groups of children with the coats of arms of Lower Austria, Bohemia, Vienna and Prague. The figures were made of St. Margarethen sandy limestone by the sculptor Franz Melnitzky.

The vaulted ceiling was designed with shields of various allegories and the names of experts from the painter Pietro Isella from Morcote. The building was furnished and planned by Bäumer. It had cassetted ceilings, wall paintings, wallpapers and pilasters as well as lighting fixtures. The painter Hermann Burghart designed the first-class waiting room, which featured cities and views of the Nordwest-Bahn. The sculptors Franz Schönthaler and Rudolf Winder worked in the court salon. The station was the arrival point for the German nobility in Vienna. There were waiting rooms for second and third class.

The estimated construction costs were 1 1/2-2 million florins (converted is about €13 to 17 million). In fact, the costs amounted to ƒ2.3 million including financing, despite an extremely short construction period of around 17 months. The work was complicated by the marshy terrain on which up to four metres of earth had to be piled up. The ground was transported by a special field train over the Danube canal from Heiligenstadt.

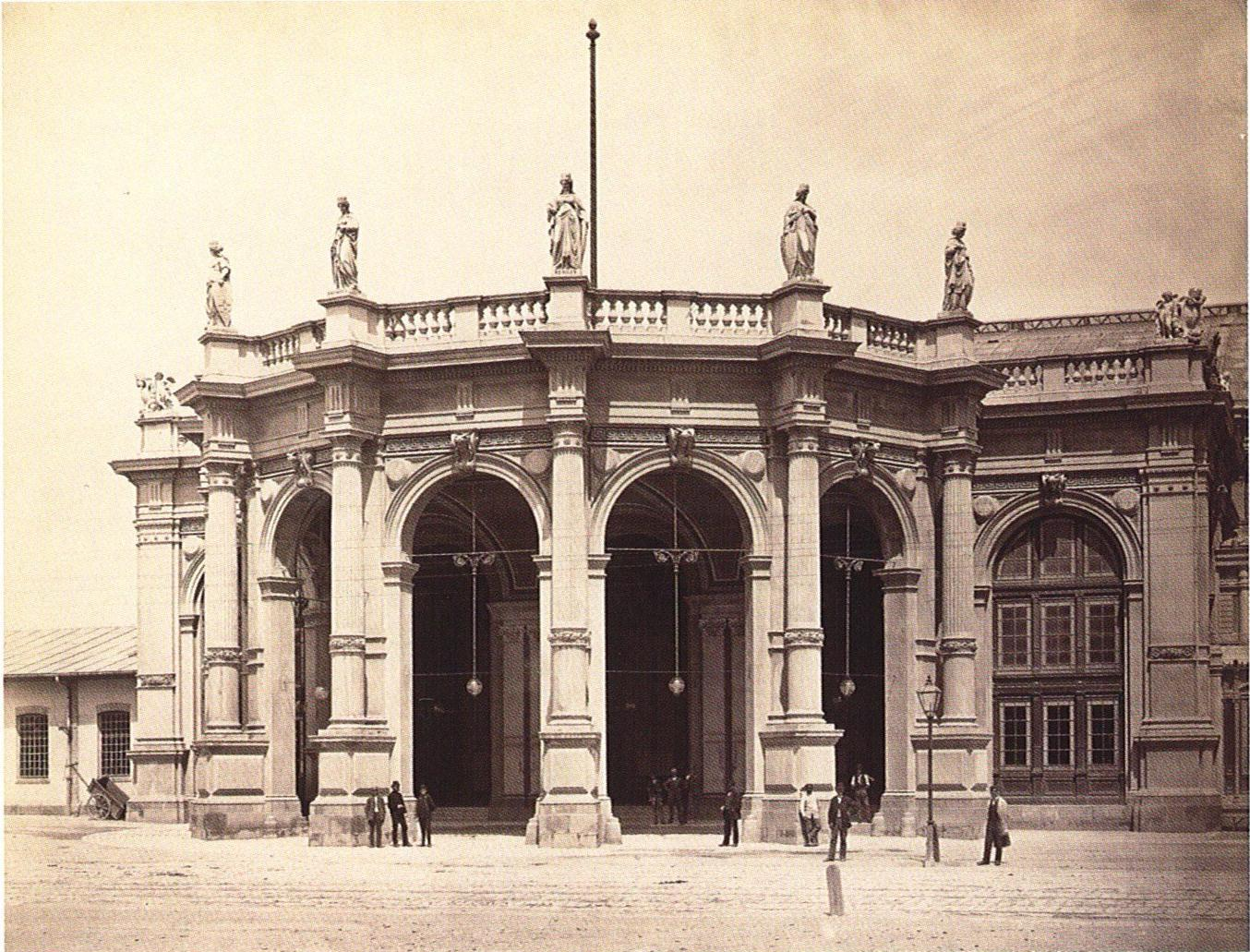
The striking downhill side with statues of the cities of the Northwest Railway

On 1 June 1872, the railway station with a 360 tonne iron roof construction was opened in an unfinished state when the section Vienna (Northwestbahnhof)-Jedlersee was opened for the transport of passengers, luggage and express goods by public transport. Long-distance transport with express trains to Dresden and Berlin started. The trip to Berlin lasted 19 hours (today 10 hours), the price for the second class was 15 thalers 26 groschen (approx. €75). The completion was just in time for the 1873 Vienna World's Fair.

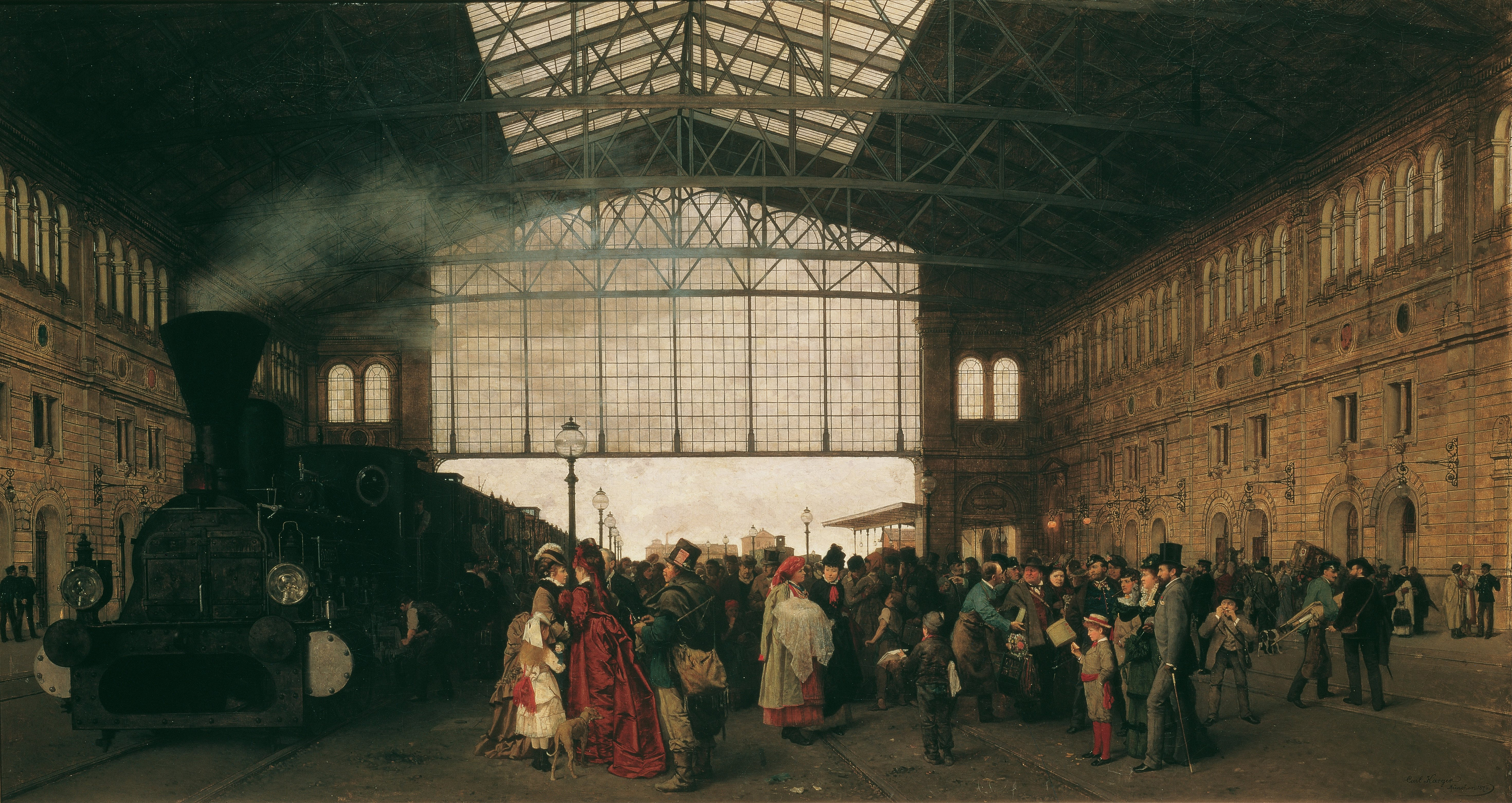
The Nordwestbahnhof, painting by Karl Karger (1875)

The main reception building at the corner of Nordwestbahnstraße and Taborstraße was served by two tram lines. Today's Line 2 (formerly N) served as a transit line connecting the city centre through Taborstrasse. The tangential line Line 5 connects the Nordwestbahnhof (northwest station) with Nordbahnhof, Franz-Josefs-Bahnhof and Westbahnhof (west station).

In the period up to 1914, the freight station was extended several times by the construction of tracks (a total of 51), magazines and transfer platforms. Some warehouses are still standing today. Incoming goods at the station were, for example, sea fish from the North Sea from 1899 onwards. The Deutsche Dampffischerei-Gesellschaft Nordsee, which was founded in Bremen in 1896 and is still active today as a restaurant chain Nordsee, set itself the goal of supplying people in the inland with fresh fish in the fastest possible way, set up a fish shop. The North Sea ports were also used to transport the first tropical fruit, the bananas, to Vienna via the Northwest Station. In the core area of the railway area were the forwarding agencies. Unloading and transhipment points for coal and wood, for example, were located on the edges. Companies of different sizes arose in the new development area of the 20th district, as new sources of economic income opened up with the railway traffic. For example, the delivery of milk from the surrounding area of Vienna led to the establishment of several milk processing plants such as NÖM.

The first political event that took place at Nordwestbahnhof was the assassination of social democratic politician Franz Schuhmeier. On 11 February 1913, Paul Kunschak, brother of the Christian-social politician Leopold Kunschak, shot in the station concourse.

== The period after 1918 ==
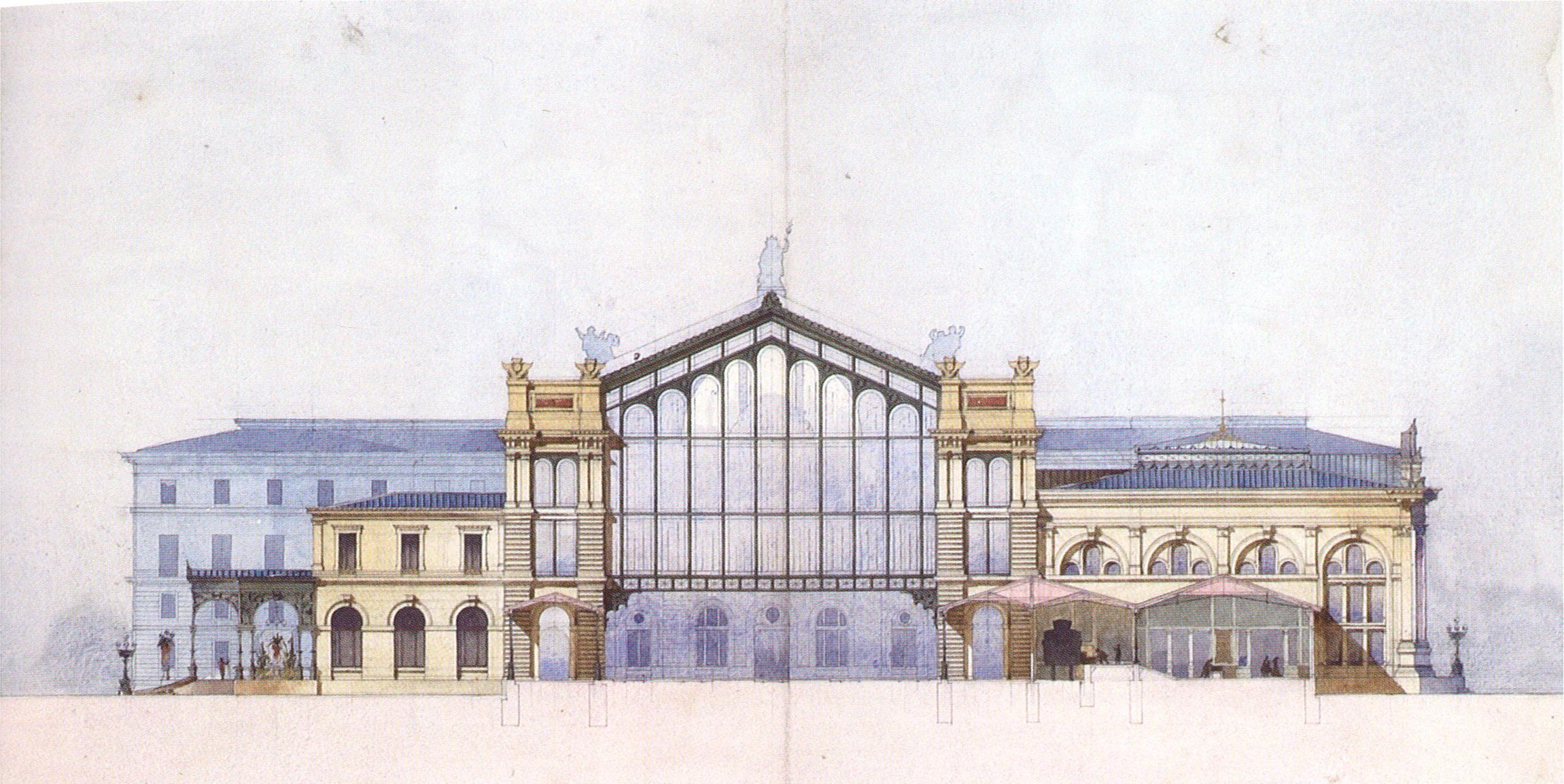
Cross section, drawn by Wilhelm Bäumer

Since the beginning of 1923, a traffic contraction plan has been in place for the Northwest and nearby Nordbahnhof. For reasons of economy and because of the two-thirds drop in passenger numbers since 1914, passenger handling at Nordwestbahnhof was discontinued on 1 February 1924; the passenger trains of the Nordwestbahn were then operated from Nordbahnhof.

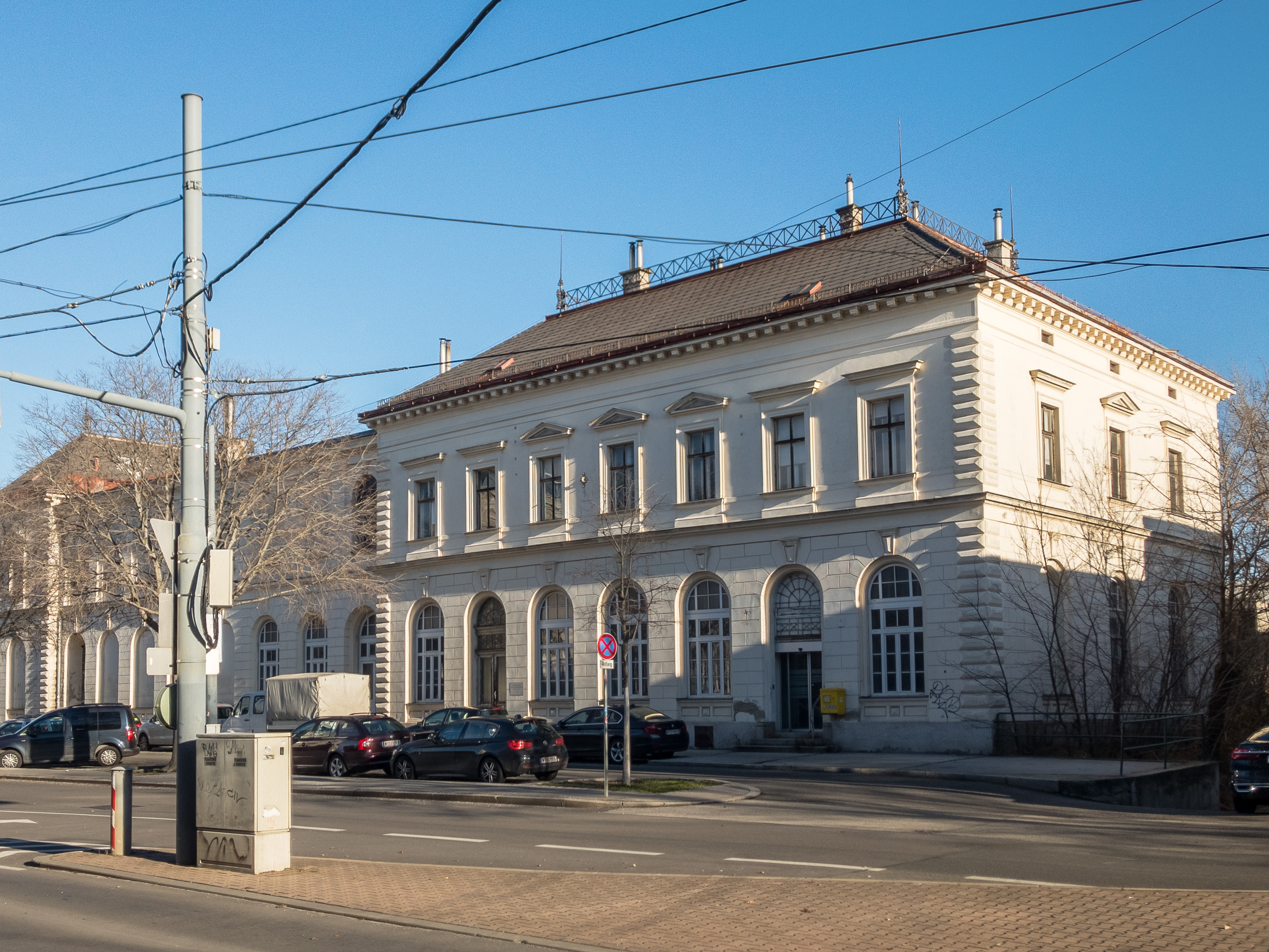
Last rest of the station, closed post office 1024

The now useless station concourse was used for exhibitions, political and sporting events. Even indoor skiing could be done on a snow-covered sloping plain. After the opening of the "snow palace" on 26 November 1927, the Social Democratic mayor of Vienna, Karl Seitz, was attacked by a pistol, which he and his companions survived unharmed. The hall was also used as a storage hall for unused locomotives.

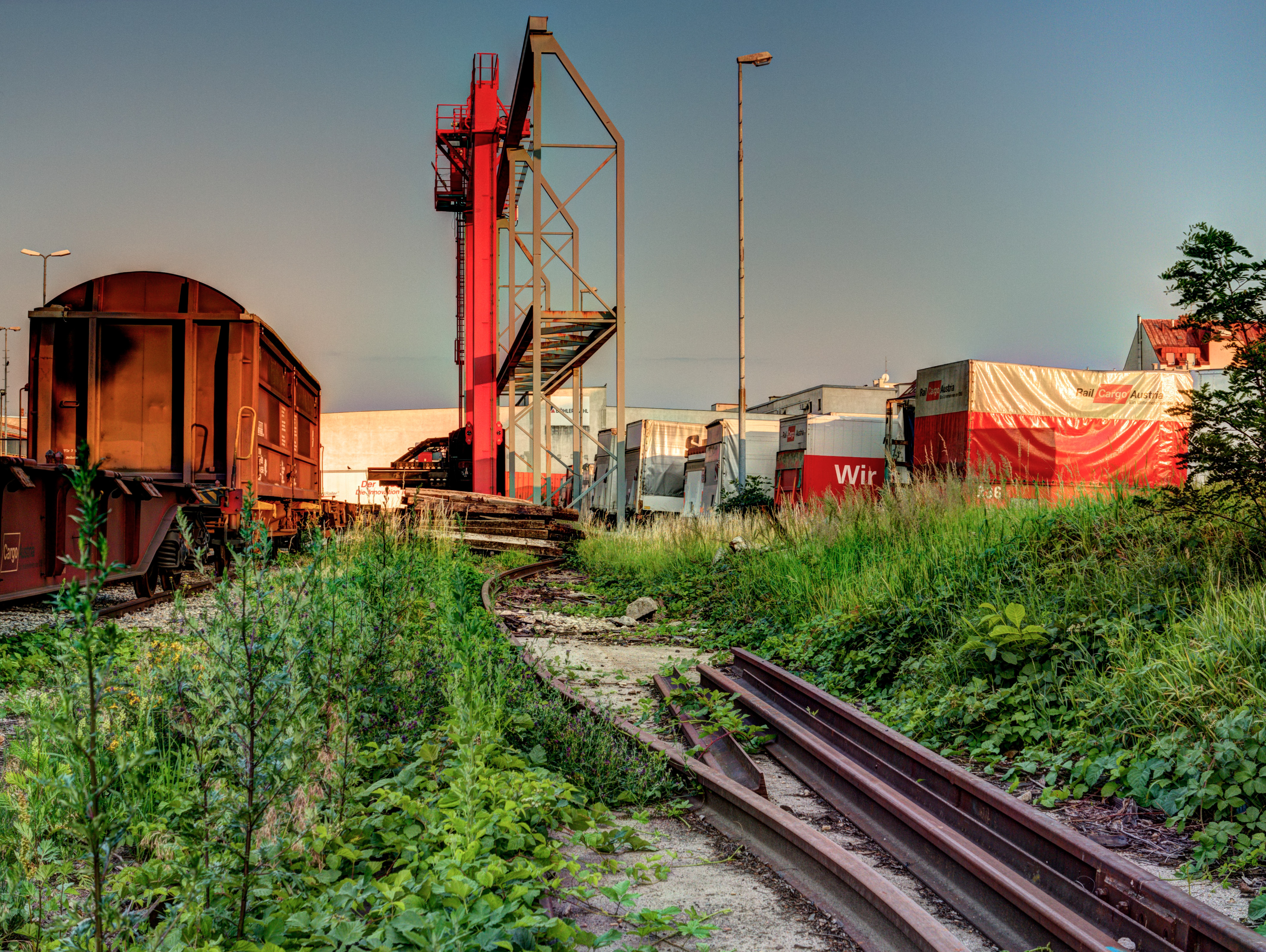
Small container crane at the level of Wallensteinstraße, dismantled in 2015

After the "Anschluss" of Austria, Hermann Göring held propaganda speeches on 26 March 1938 and Adolf Hitler, Joseph Goebbels and other leading Nazi politicians on 9 April 1938, the day before the "referendum" on the integration of Austria into the German Reich, in the station hall. The anti-Semitic exhibition "The Eternal Jew" shown in the station was intended to legitimize the persecutions of Jews that had begun.

During the war, the Wehrmacht used the building as a warehouse. In order to relieve the pressure on Nordbahnhof, the Deutsche Reichsbahn demanded the railway station back on December 12, 1942, and provisionally repaired it again. On November 1, 1943, passenger traffic between Nordwestbahnhof and Jedlersdorf was resumed. The Northwest Station was severely damaged by Soviet artillery fire during the Vienna Offensive in April 1945 shortly before the end of the war. The reception building was demolished in 1952. Nevertheless, after the war, the trains of the North railway were also handled here after the war, because this was interrupted by the demolition of the north runway bridge; however, the northwest runway bridge (northern bridge) was already navigable again on August 25, 1945.

The Russian occupying power (Red Army) required a rail link to Russia in order to remove booty from Austria. Therefore, the site was also under secret observation of the United States intelligence service (USIS). The so-called "Russenschleife" was built to connect the north station area and the connecting railway line to the south station with the other bank of the Danube. From April 1945, the higher track position of the northern runway was reached via a ramp. This 652 m long loop of the Russians led from the easternmost corner of the Nordwestbahnhof to the westernmost tracks of the Nordbahnhof (Northern Railway Station) across the confluence of Taborstraße and Nordbahnstraße. It was also used by heavy steam locomotives (e. g. DRB Class 52) and crossed the tracks of the tram line "O" on the same level without technical protection. With the opening of the Nordbahn bridge to traffic on 31 May 1959, the loop was dismantled.

After the resumption of scheduled train services on the North Railway Bridge, the new Praterstern station was provisionally put into operation. As a result, passenger handling at Nordwestbahnhof was finally discontinued (or relocated to Praterstern station) on 31 May 1959 and the Northwest Railway Bridge over the Danube was converted into a road bridge. Since the closure of the Northwest Railway Bridge, the tracks of the station near the freight station Brigittenau, near the former bridge, have been connected to the Danube embankment railway by loops to the north and south.

In the 1970s, the site of the Northwest Station was expanded into a then modern freight and container terminal with cranes and warehouses. On 29 September 1974, the electrification of the railway lines at the station and the approach tracks was put into operation.

== Subsequent use of the area ==
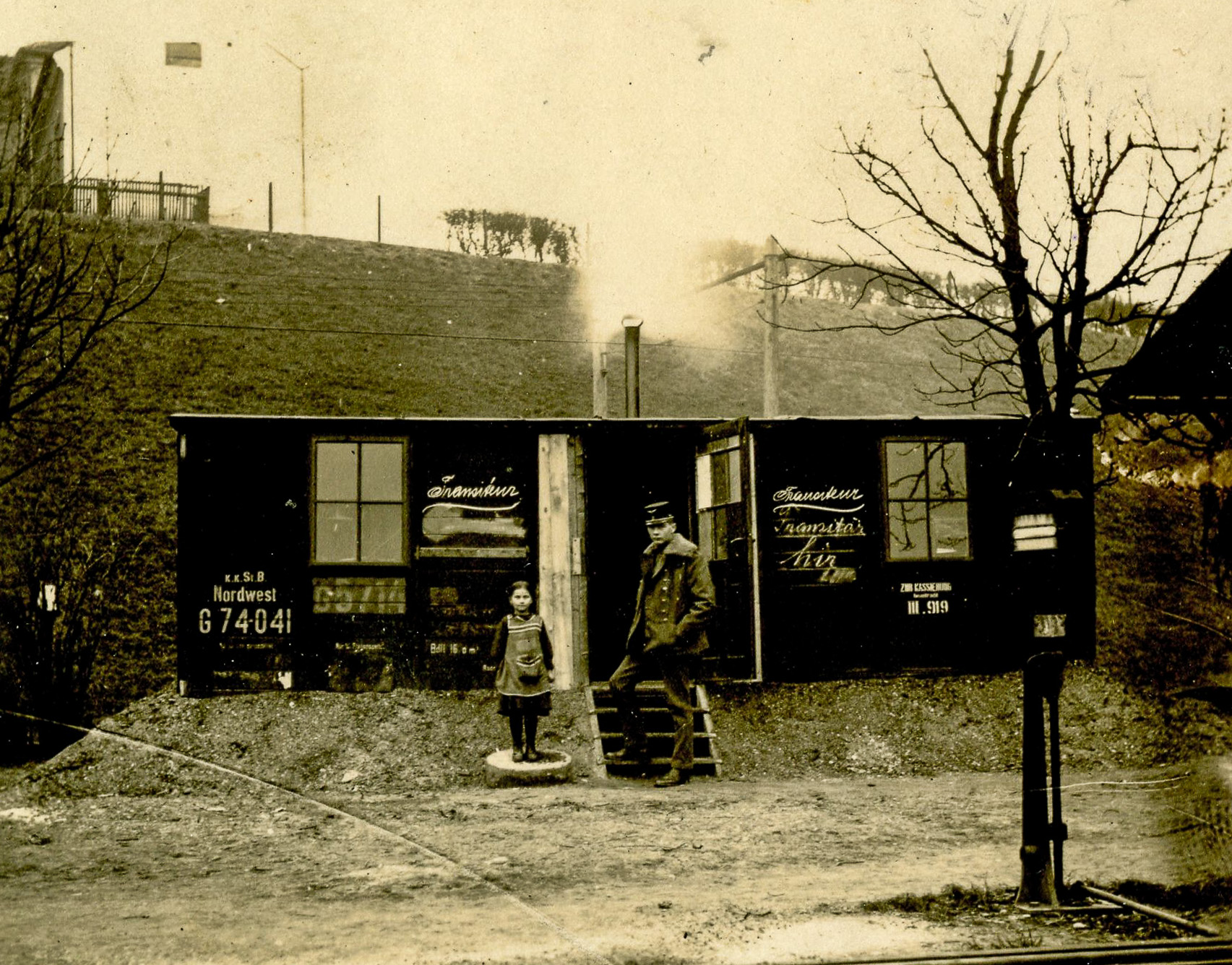
Emergency quarter from Northwest Railway Railway Carriage

In 2006, the ÖBB as landowner decided to gradually move the goods terminal from the Nordwestbahnhof area (after the Wien-Inzersdorf terminal to be completed by 2017). This is intended to facilitate a new use of the site in stages: according to the 2009 forecast, a new district will be created here in the period 2020–2025. The barrier Northwest Station, which now divides the 20th district into two parts, is to be removed. In recent years, there has been a large company garage in the north of the station area on Nordwestbahnstrasse, which is used by various companies such as ÖBB-Postbus or Verkehrsbetriebe Gschwindl as well as driving schools and the fire brigade.

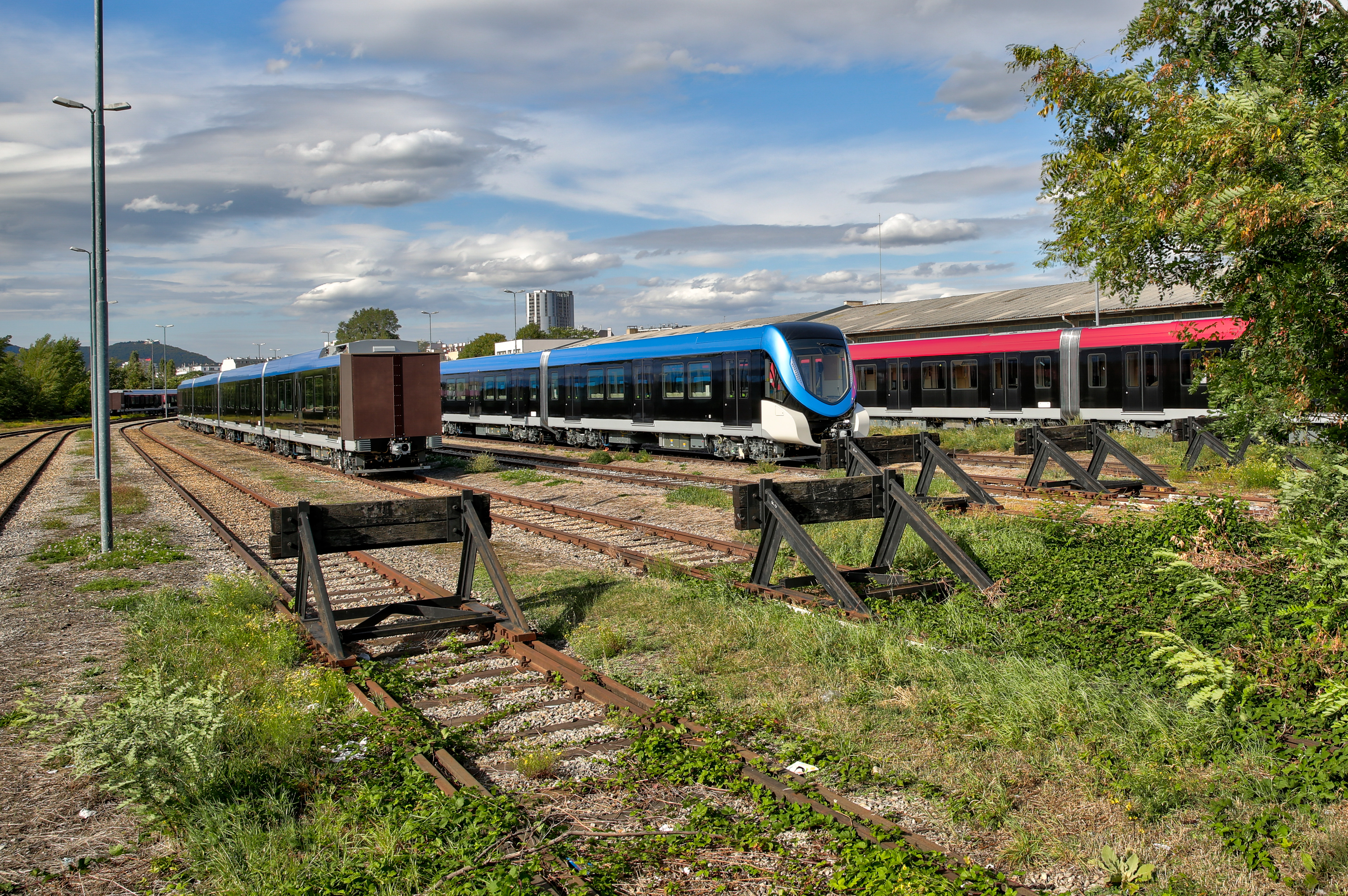
2017 temporary storage for metro trains of Riyadh

Until mid-2007, an urban planning model was initially developed. On the basis of this, an Architectural design competition was held in March 2008, in which the Swiss firm ernst niklaus fausch Architekten (referred to as ENF Architekten Zürich in 2009) won first prize.

On a total of 44 hectares, apartments are planned for 12,000 people, workplaces for 5,000 people and a large park. The area will be divided into smaller areas for this purpose, which will be used by different developers. A tram line could run through the area on a street between Wallensteinstraße and Traisengasse, otherwise there are no continuous roads planned. In the autumn of 2017 it is expected that by 2030, approximately 800,000 m^{2} of gross floor area will be created. The first property sales to developers are planned for 2020/21.

A re-use concept based on the High Line Park in New York was developed for the approach route of the former Nordwestbahnhof (northwest station), the siding of the Nordwestbahnhof to the Donauuferbahn (Nussdorf to Wiener Hafen) and the High Line Park in New York. The almost 2 km long railway embankment would provide an uninterrupted pedestrian and bicycle connection to the Danube and would link the entire catchment area to the planned Nordwestbahnhof-Park and Augarten.
