= Wien Praterstern railway station =

Railway station in Vienna, Austria

Coordinates: 48.2185°N 16.3922°E

Wien Praterstern
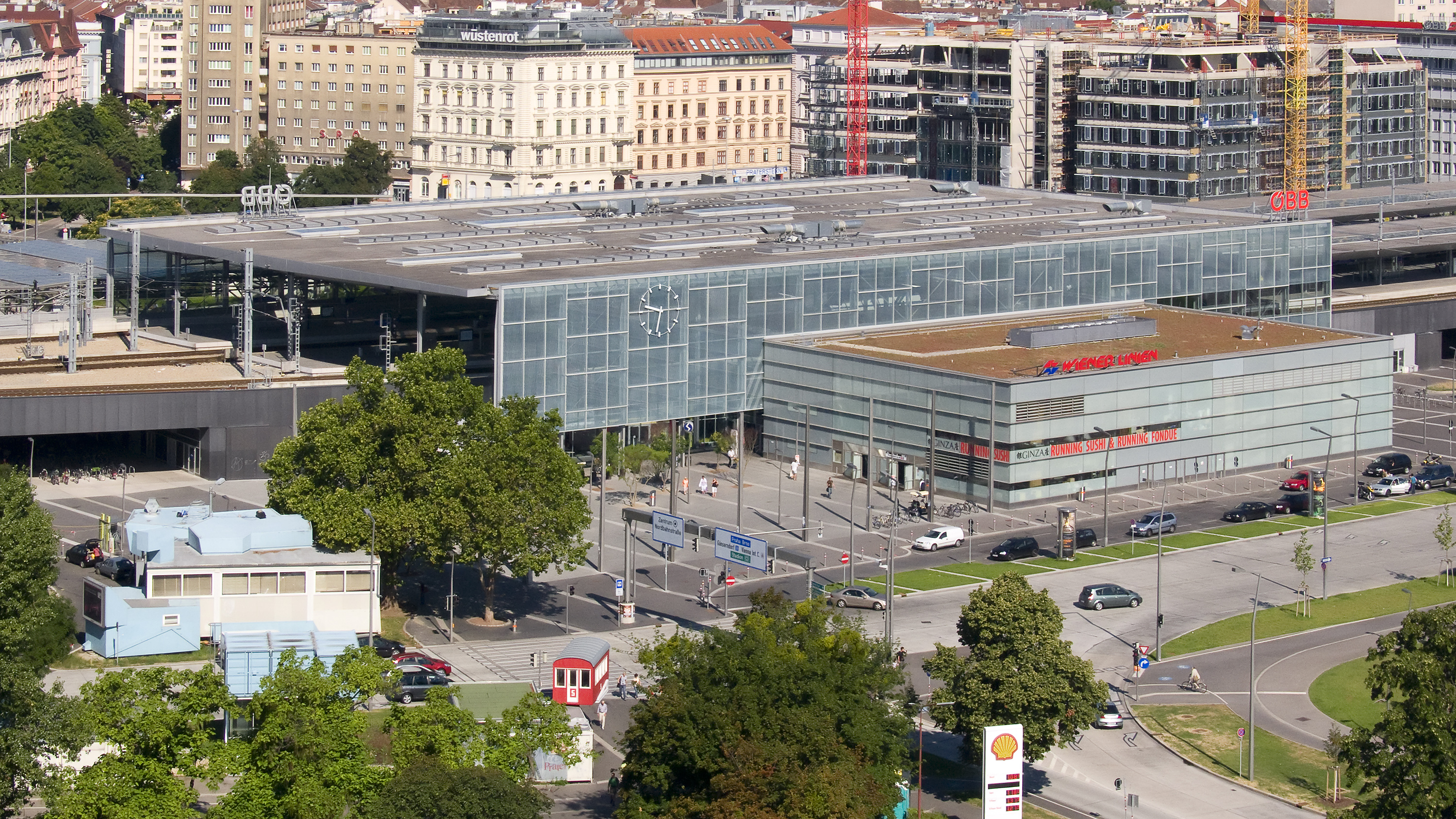

General information
- Location: 1020 Vienna; Austria
- Owner: ÖBB
- Lines: North railway line; Verbindungsbahn
- Platforms: 2 island platforms
- Tracks: 4
- Train operators: ÖBB
- Connections: O 5 5B 80A 82A N25 N29

Services
Preceding station	Vienna S-Bahn	Following station
Wien Mitte towards Wien Meidling	S1	Wien Traisengasse towards Marchegg
Wien Mitte towards Mödling	S2	Wien Traisengasse towards Laa an der Thaya
Wien Mitte towards Wiener Neustadt Hbf	S3	Wien Traisengasse towards Hollabrunn
Wien Mitte towards Wiener Neustadt Hbf	S4	Wien Traisengasse towards Absdorf-Hippersdorf
Wien Mitte towards Wolfsthal	S7	Wien Traisengasse towards Laa an der Thaya
Location

Wien Praterstern (German for Vienna Praterstern) is one of Vienna's main railway stations, used by 35,000 people daily. It is located on the roundabout Praterstern in Leopoldstadt, in the north of the city. Vienna's two most recognisable structures, the Wiener Riesenrad (Ferris wheel) and the Stephansdom (cathedral), are both visible from the platforms. Underneath the station is the Praterstern U-Bahn station, which is on U1 and U2 of the Vienna U-Bahn.

== History ==
The first station was built during the construction of the North railway. It was opened on 6 January 1838 as k.k. Nordbahnhof (Imperial and Royal North railway station) in the style in which the names of virtually all public works were rendered at the time. Due to rapidly rising passenger numbers, the station became too small very quickly and had to be rebuilt.

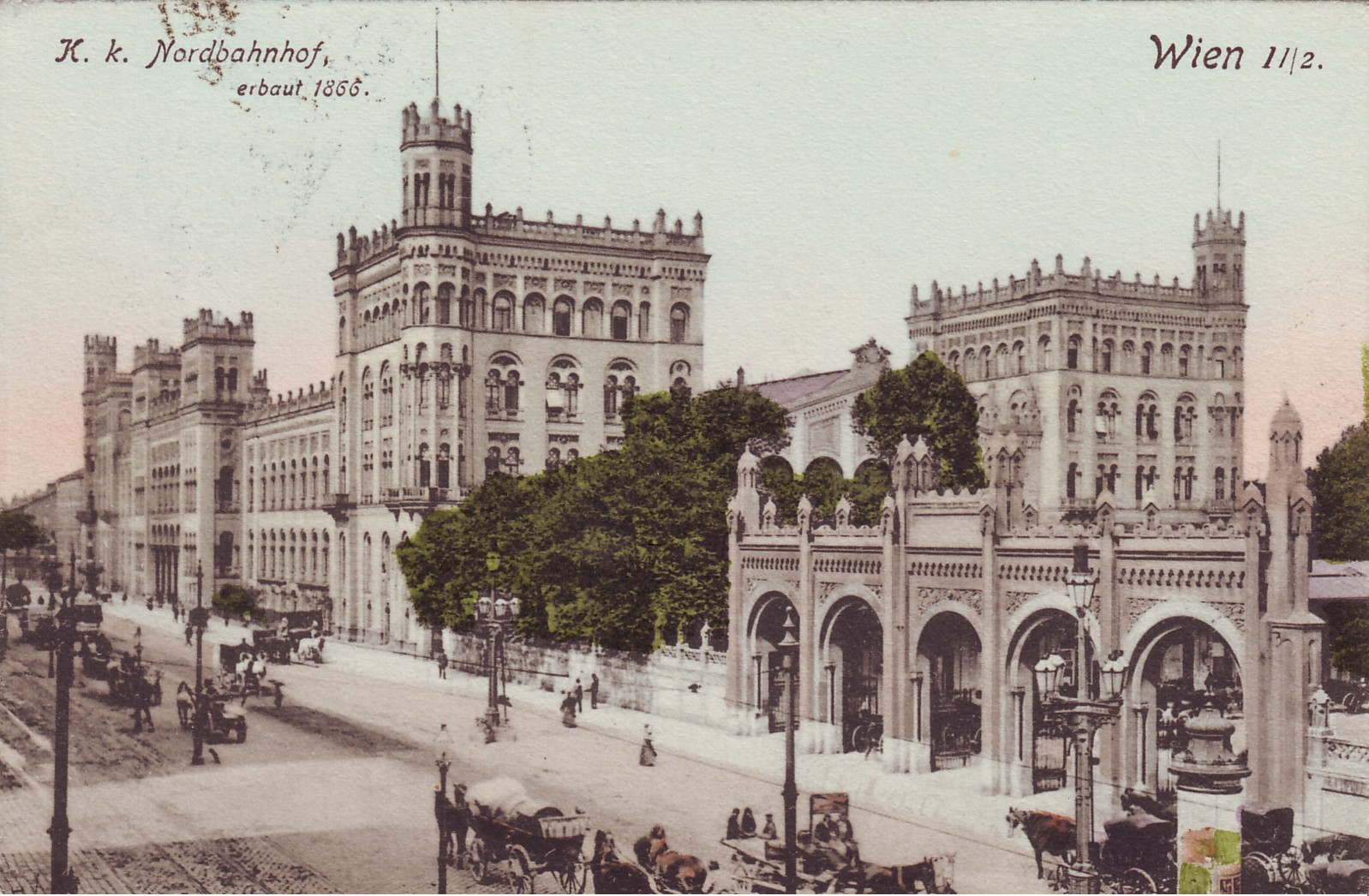
The old Nordbahnhof in 1908

Between 1858 and 1865, the station building in the vicinity of Praterstern was built. Like all other stations in Vienna at this time, the Northern Station was planned to be an exhibition building. Several architects were assigned to planning the building, interior decorating was done by sculptors and fresco painters. The station was opened on 15 November 1865. In the days of Austria-Hungary, the station was one of the most significant stations in Europe and Vienna's primary railway stations, connecting Vienna with Brno, Prague and Warsaw. For many immigrants, it was the door to Vienna. The train traffic to Germany and its seaports passed through the nearby Nordwestbahnhof (Northwest railway station), which was opened in 1872.

During World War II, the station was severely damaged by bombs and subsequently fell into disuse; it was finally demolished in 1965. The new building was constructed directly at Praterstern for logistical reasons and was opened on 1 June 1959 as Bahnhof Praterstern. On 1 September 1975, it was renamed Wien Nord.

In 1997, the Austrian Federal Railways started a nationwide renovation initiative, in the course of which it was decided to completely rebuild this station to a design by the architect Albert Wimmer, featuring a transparent roof for the station and its platforms and improved interchange with the U-Bahn, trams and buses. On platform level, the new station was completed in April 2007; prior to that it had been renamed to Wien Praterstern again with the introduction of the new timetable in December 2006.

The new station offers 6,000 m^{2} of space for businesses and service enterprises. Platforms were raised to 55 cm above the track age to make boarding and disembarkation easier. A tactile orientation system is planned for blind people.

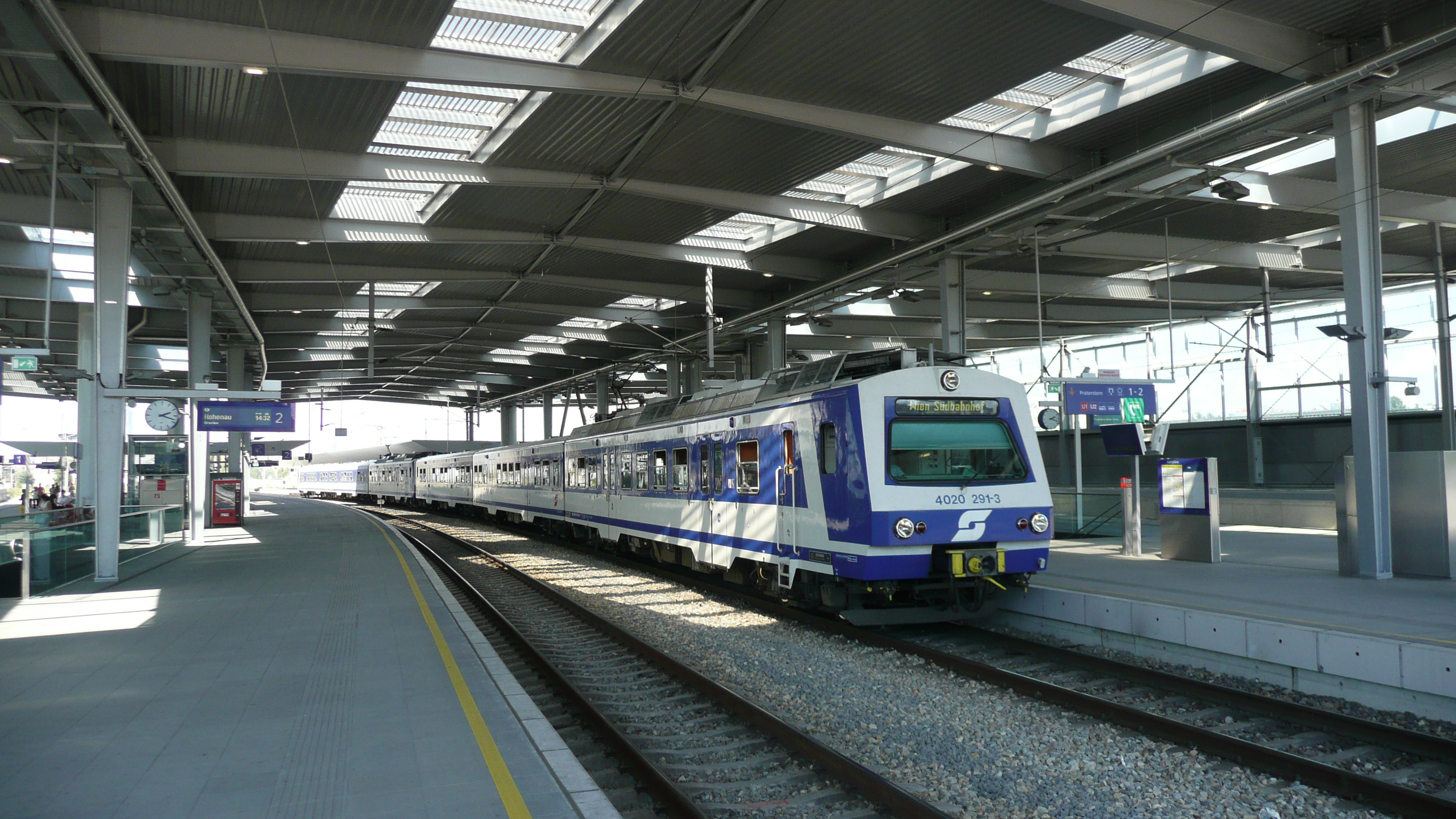
Platforms

The reconstruction started in 2004 and was completed in April 2008.

== Reconstruction of the freight station ==
No longer needed by the Austrian Federal Railways, the site of the former freight station is planned to be transformed into a new city district. The section along Lasallestraße was redeveloped back in the 1990s, almost entirely as office buildings. At first, a new line parallel to these blocks is planned. The area is to be expanded to the northwest in stages. The tram line O is planned to be extended into this area as well. However, the time horizon of this project lies around 2025.
