= Northwest railway line =

Railway line in Austria and the Czech Republic

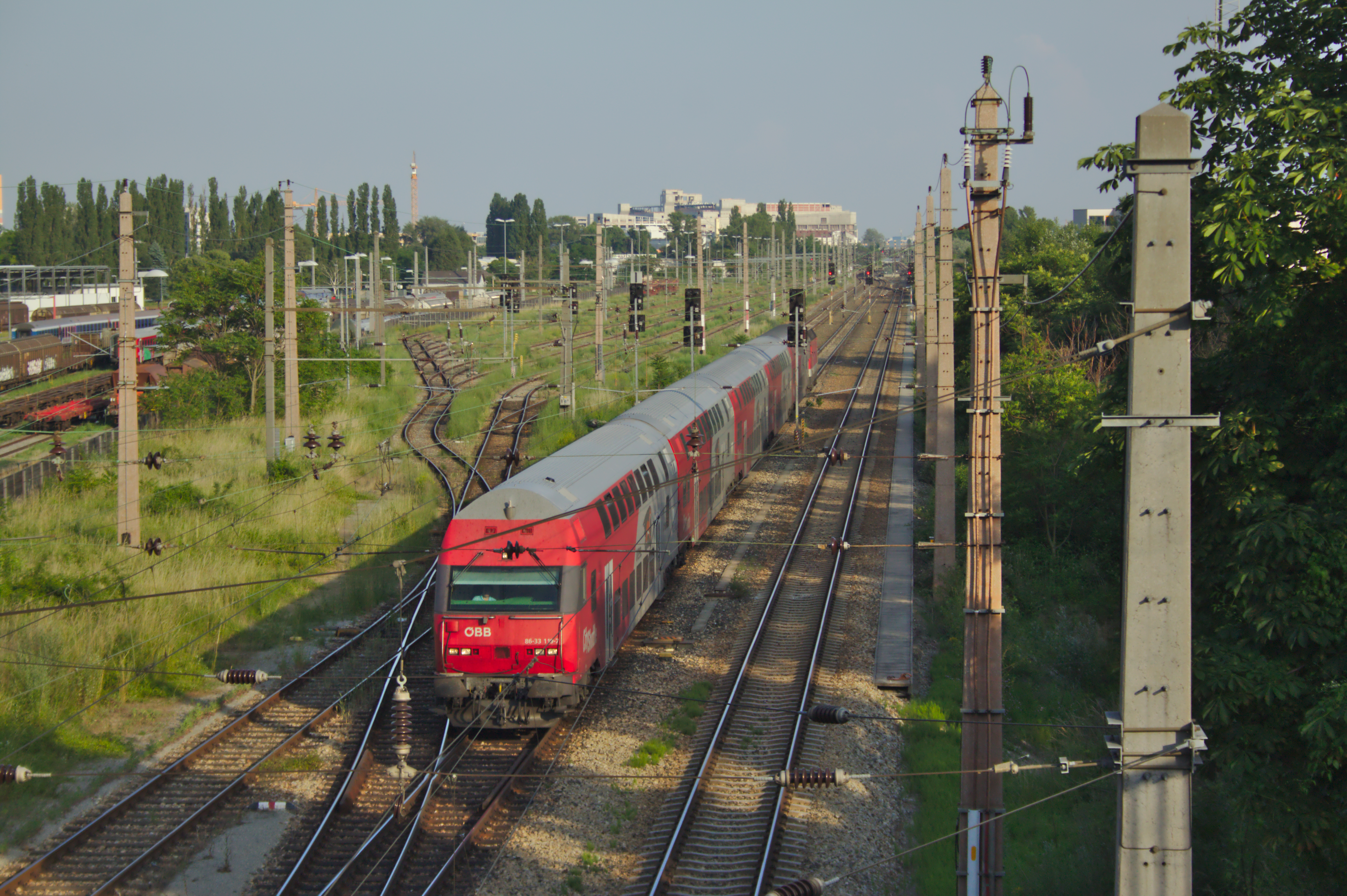
- Passenger train on the Northwest railway line near Strebersdorf in 2014

Overview
- Termini: Wien Floridsdorf; Znojmo

History
- Opened: 26 July 1841

Technical
- Line length: 95.9 km (59.6 mi)
- Track gauge: 1,435 mm (4 ft 8 1/2 in) standard gauge
- Electrification: 15 kV 16.7 Hz AC
Route map
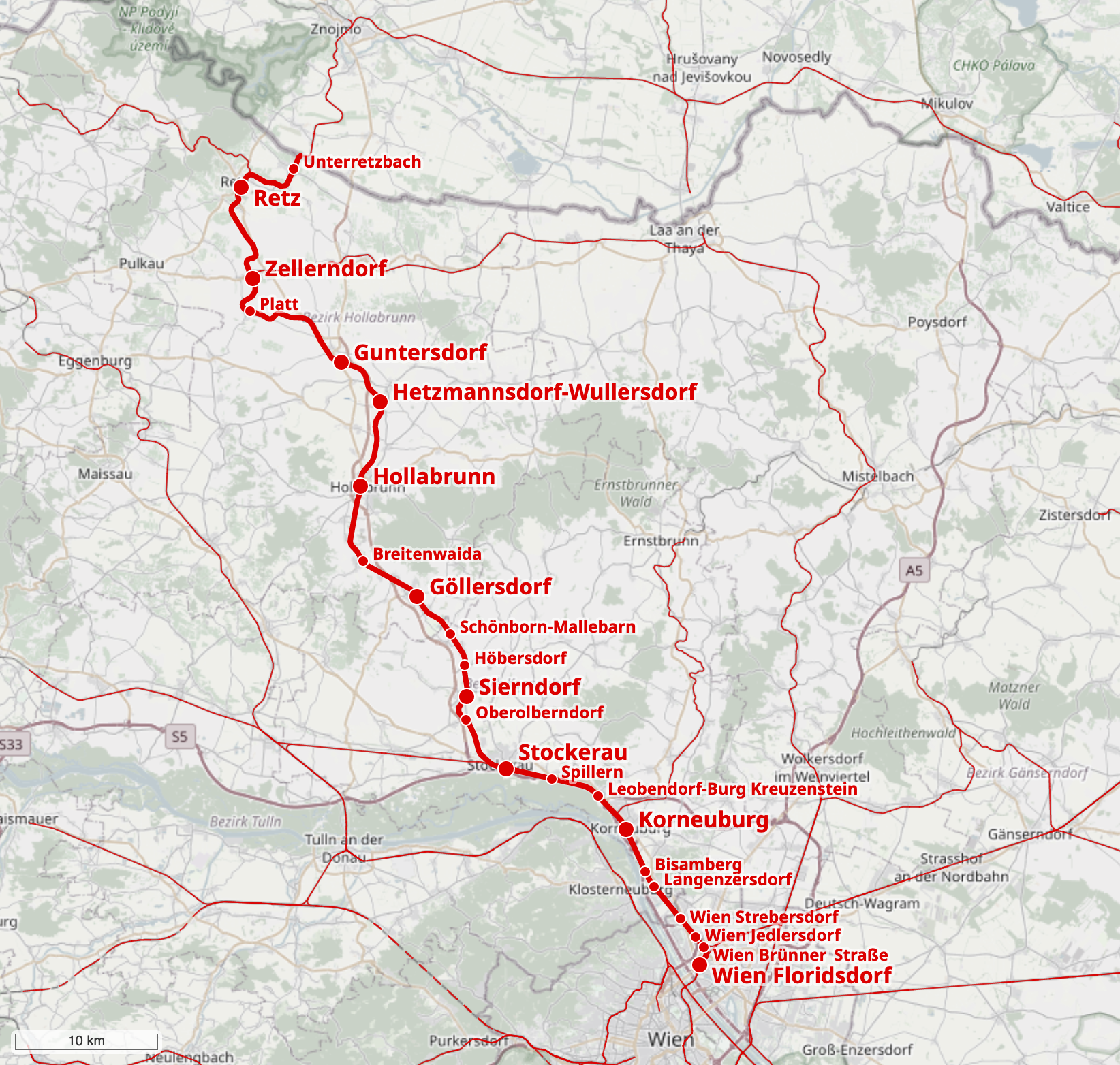
- Source

The Northwest railway line (German: Nordwestbahn) is an electrified railway line that runs 95.9 kilometres (59.6 mi) from Wien Floridsdorf, in the vicinity of Vienna, to Znojmo in the Czech Republic.

== History ==
The Emperor Ferdinand Northern Railway completed the line between Wien Floridsdorf and Stockerau on 26 July 1841. At Floridsdorf, it branched from the company's main line between Vienna and Lundenburg (now Břeclav). The Austrian Northwestern Railway was established in 1870, and incorporated the Floridsdorf–Stockerau line into its new main line between Wien Nordwestbahnhof and Znaim (now Znojmo). The complete line opened in June 1872.

Passenger service to Nordwestbahnhof ended on 30 May 1959. The bridge which carried the line over the Danube was rebuilt to carry road traffic. The line was electrified between Floridsdorf and Stockerau on 17 January 1962. This electrification was extended to Hollabrunn in 1979 and Retz in 1993. ÖBB and České dráhy electrified the line between Retz and Znojmo, with service beginning on 20 October 2006.

== Service ==
The S3 and S4 of the Vienna S-Bahn combine for half-hourly service between Wien Floridsdorf and Stockerau; the S3 provides hourly service between Stockerau and Hollabrunn. A Regional-Express provides additional service over the whole line between Vienna and Znojmo.
