= Wien Leopoldau railway station =

Railway station in Vienna, Austria

Wien Leopoldau
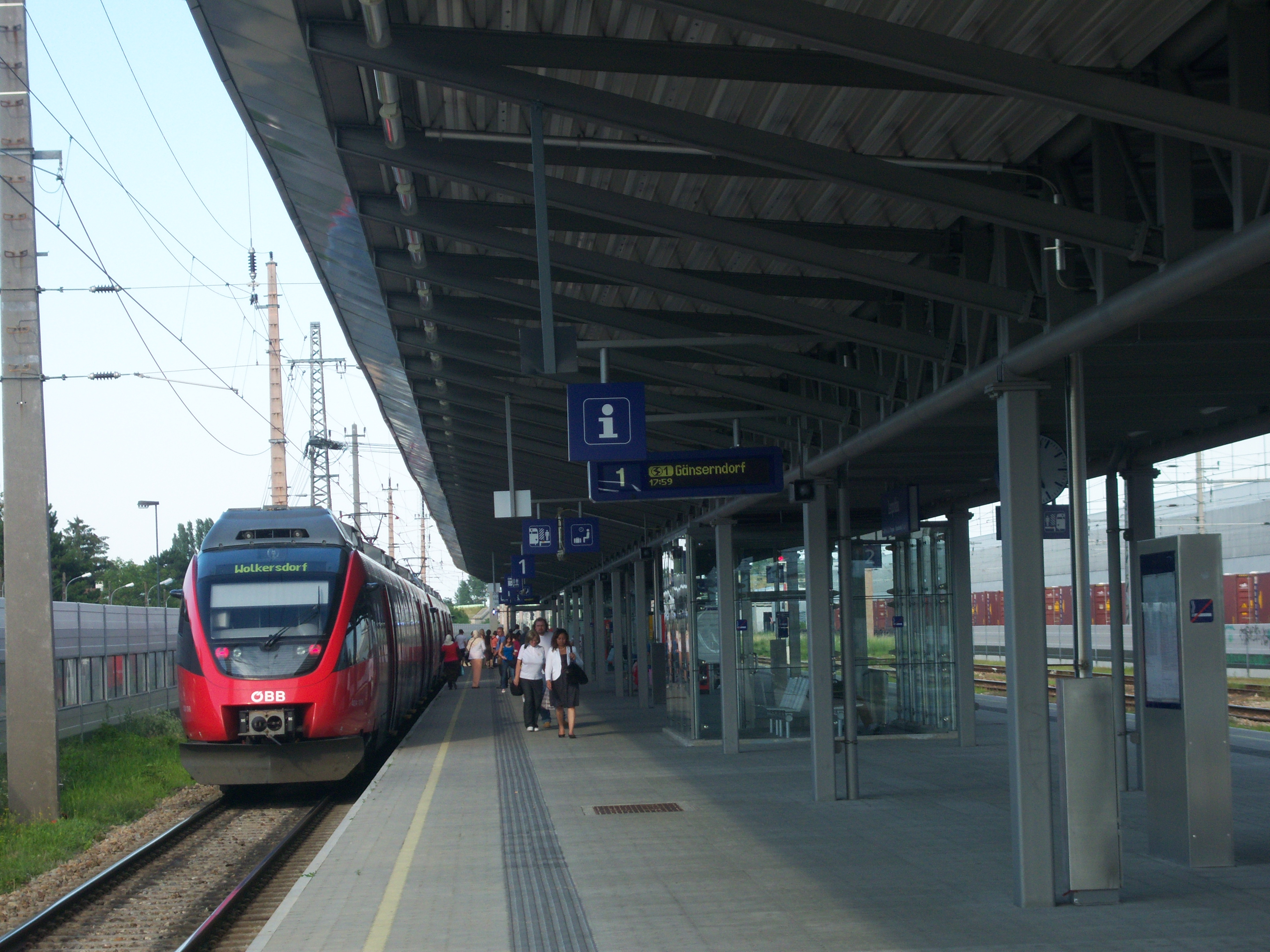

General information
- Location: A-1210 Wien; Austria
- Coordinates: 48°16′39″N 16°27′08″E
- Owner: Austrian Federal Railways (ÖBB)
- Operator: Austrian Federal Railways (ÖBB)
- Lines: North railway; Floridsdorfer Hochbahn
- Connections: S-Bahn: U-Bahn: Bus: 29A, 32A, 36B, N25, 510

History
- Opened: 1912

Services
Preceding station	Vienna S-Bahn	Following station
Wien Siemensstraße towards Wien Meidling	S1	Wien Süßenbrunn towards Marchegg
Wien Siemensstraße towards Mödling	S2	Gerasdorf towards Laa an der Thaya
Wien Siemensstraße towards Wolfsthal	S7	Gerasdorf towards Laa an der Thaya
Location
- Location within Austria

Wien Leopoldau (German for Vienna Leopoldau) is a railway station located in the Floridsdorf district of Vienna, Austria. Opened in 1912, it is owned and operated by the Austrian Federal Railways (ÖBB), and is served by both regional and S-Bahn trains.

Underneath the station is the Leopoldau U-Bahn station, which is the northeastern terminus of U1 of the Vienna U-Bahn.
