= North railway line =

Railway line from Vienna, Austria to Břeclav, Czech Republic

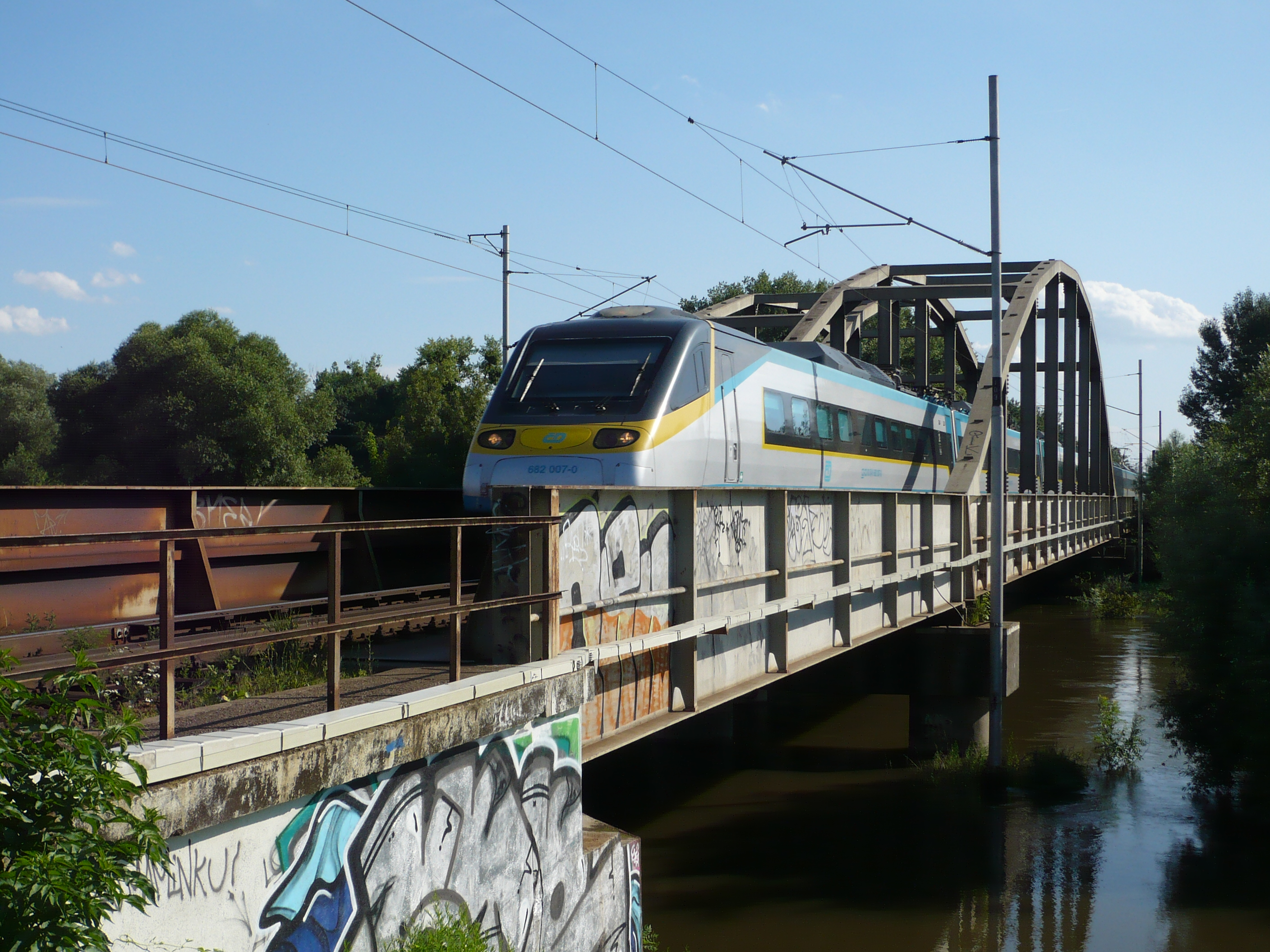
- A Pendolino from Vienna to Prague crosses the Thaya in 2009

Overview
- Native name: Nordbahn
- Line number: 114 01
- Termini: Wien Praterstern; Břeclav

Technical
- Line length: 83.1 km (51.6 mi)
- Track gauge: 1,435 mm (4 ft 8 1/2 in) standard gauge
- Electrification: 15 kV 16.7 Hz AC (Vienna–border); 25 kV 50 Hz AC (border–Břeclav)
- Operating speed: 200 km/h (125 mph)

The North railway line (German: Nordbahn) is a two-track, electrified railway line that runs 83.1 kilometres (51.6 mi) from Vienna, Austria to Břeclav, Czech Republic. It was built by the Emperor Ferdinand North Railway company as a part of the Warsaw–Vienna railway.

== Route ==
The North railway line begins at Wien Praterstern, in the Leopoldstadt district of Vienna. It extends north from the Verbindungsbahn, the primary trunk line of the Vienna S-Bahn. It runs east-north-east out of Vienna, crossing the Danube at Wien Handelskai. There are major junctions with the Northwest railway line near Wien Floridsdorf and the Laaer Ostbahn near Wien Süßenbrunn. At Gänserndorf, the Gänserndorf–Marchegg railway line splits off to serve Marchegg, while the North railway line turns north toward the Czech Republic.

From Angern an der March, the line follows the Morava river north. It crosses the Austrian–Czech border near Bernhardsthal, then continuing 5.1 kilometres (3.2 mi) to Břeclav. The line is electrified at 15 kV 16.7 Hz AC within Austria and 25 kV 50 Hz AC within the Czech Republic.

== Operation ==
The S1 of the Vienna S-Bahn provides frequent service between Wien Meidling and Gänserndorf, with some services continuing over the Gänserndorf–Marchegg railway line to Marchegg. Regional-Express trains operate hourly between Payerbach-Reichenau or Wiener Neustadt and Břeclav. Various long-distance Railjet, EuroCity, EuroNight, and Nightjet services use the route as well, but do not make local stops between Wien Hauptbahnhof and Břeclav.
