= Wien Liesing railway station =

Railway station in Vienna, Austria

Wien Liesing
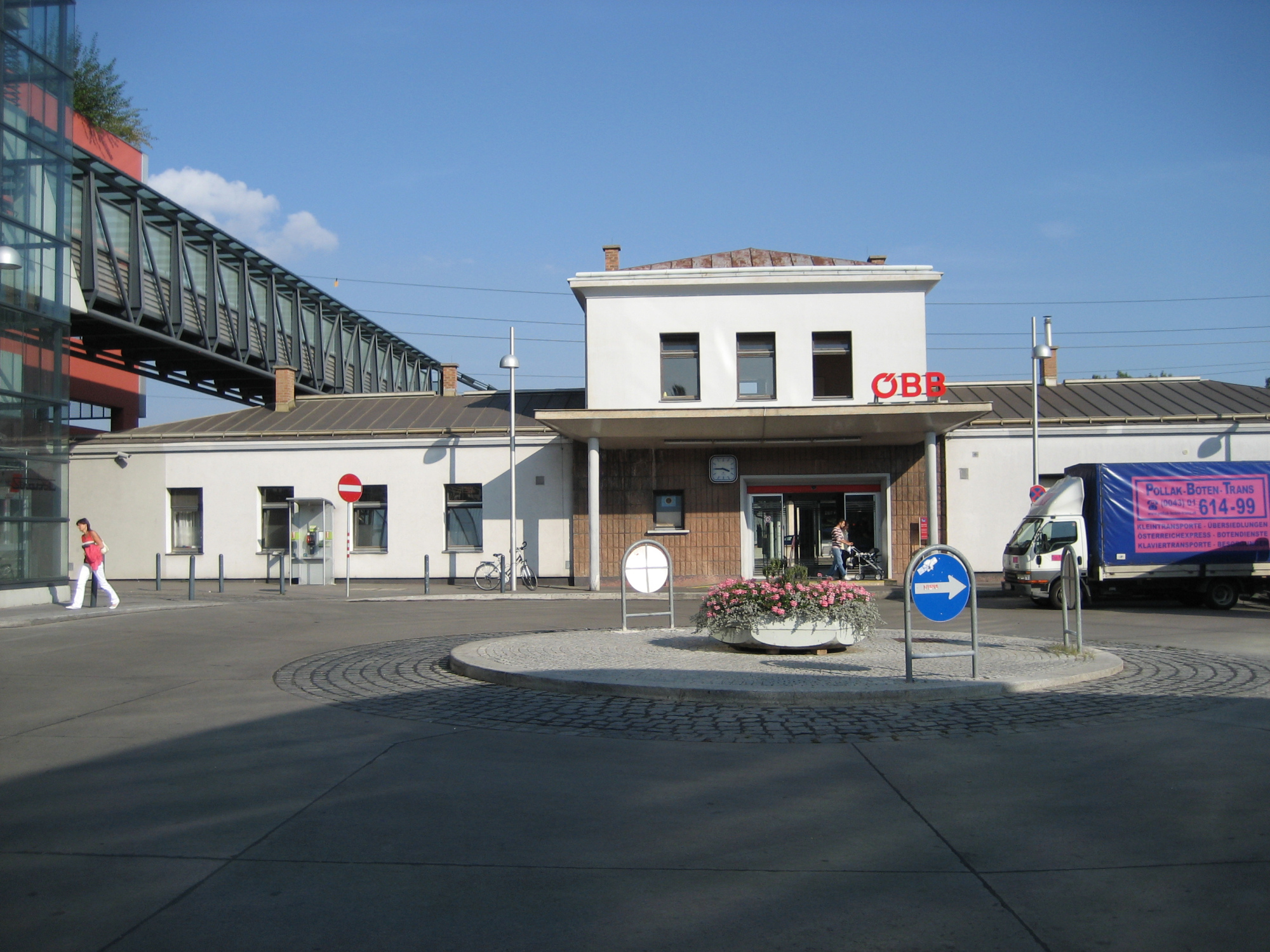

General information
- Location: Liesingerplatz 1 Austria
- Coordinates: 48°08′05″N 16°17′02″E
- System: S-Bahn and Regional rail station
- Owner: Austrian Federal Railways
- Platforms: 1 side platform, 1 Island platform
- Tracks: 3

Construction
- Parking: 365 spaces
- Cycle facilities: 59 spaces
- Accessible: Yes

Other information
- Fare zone: Core Zone (100)

History
- Opened: 1841
- Electrified: 15 kV 16,7 Hz

Services
| Preceding station | Vienna S-Bahn | Following station |
|---|---|---|
| Perchtoldsdorf towards Mödling | S2 | Wien Atzgersdorf towards Laa an der Thaya |
| Perchtoldsdorf towards Wiener Neustadt Hbf | S3 | Wien Atzgersdorf towards Hollabrunn |
| Perchtoldsdorf towards Wiener Neustadt Hbf | S4 | Wien Atzgersdorf towards Absdorf-Hippersdorf |
Location
- Location within Austria

Wien Liesing is a railway station in the 23 district of Vienna. The station is located 7 km (4.3 mi) southwest of Meidling station and is served by S-Bahn and most ÖBB Regional trains. The station was opened in 1841 along with the Southern Railway. The historical Liesing brewery has been converted in 2010 to a shopping mall and is one block west of the station.

== Station Layout ==
| Track 3 | ← S2 toward Wolkersdorf/Mistelbach/Laa an der Thaya, S3 toward Stockerau/Hollabrunn, S4 toward Stockerau/Absdorf-Hippersdorf/Tullnerfeld, R 500 and R 510 toward Wien Floridsdorf |
Island platform
| Track 2 | → S2, S3 and S4 toward Mödling/Wiener Neustadt → |
| Track 1 | → R 500 toward Payerbach-Reichenau, R 510 toward Wienener Neustadt → |
Side platform

== Connections ==
=== City Buses ===
- 60A Liesing — Alterlaa
- 61A Liesing — Vösendorf-Siebenhirten
- 62A Liesing — Bhf. Meidling/Eichenstraße
- 64A Liesing — Hetzendorf
- 66A Liesing — Reumannplatz
