= List of busiest railway stations in Austria =

This is a list of the busiest railway stations in Austria, with all stations being considered as major stations, important junctions or hubs.

Busiest railway stations in Austria Source: ÖBB
| Rank | Station | Daily passenger movements | Year | Number of Platforms | Locale | State | Image | Source |
|---|---|---|---|---|---|---|---|---|
| 1 | Wien Hauptbahnhof | 123,500 | 2018/2019 | 12 | Vienna | | | |
| 2 | Wien Meidling | 78,226 | 2018/2019 | 8 | Vienna | | | |
| 3 | Wien Mitte | 61,872 | 2018/2019 | 3 | Vienna | | | |
| 4 | Wien Praterstern | 59,123 | 2018/2019 | 4 | Vienna | | | |
| 5 | Wien Floridsorf | 51,957 | 2018/2019 | 5 | Vienna | | | |
| 6 | Wien Handelskai | 42,519 | 2018/2019 | 4 | Vienna | | | |
| 7 | Linz Hauptbahnhof | 40,861 | 2018/2019 | 14 | Linz | Upper Austria | | |
| 8 | Innsbruck Hauptbahnhof | 38,516 | 2018/2019 | 14 | Innsbruck | Tyrol | | |
| 9 | Wiener Neustadt Hauptbahnhof | 35,847 | 2018/2019 | 10 | Wiener Neustadt | Lower Austria | | |
| 10 | Wien Rennweg | 30,146 | 2018/2019 | 2 | Vienna | | | |
| 11 | St. Pölten Hauptbahnhof | 29,094 | 2018/2019 | 9 | St. Polten | Lower Austria | | |
| 12 | Salzburg Hauptbahnhof | 28,651 | 2018/2019 | 11 | Salzburg | Salzburg | | |
| 13 | Graz Hauptbahnhof | 25,511 | 2018/2019 | 10 | Graz | Styria | | |
