= Perchtoldsdorf railway station =

Railway station in Lower Austria

Perchtoldsdorf
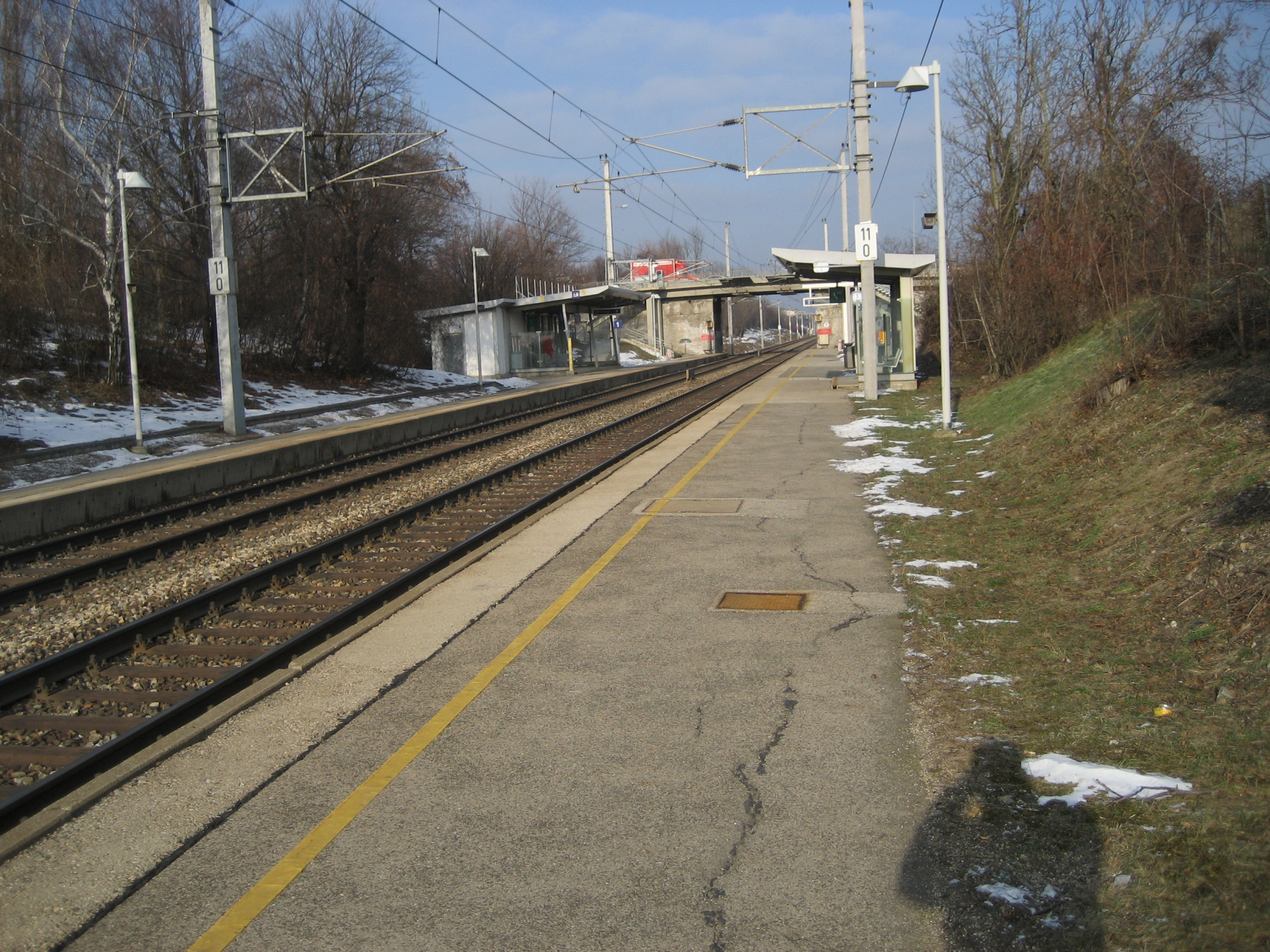

General information
- Location: Salitergasse 2734; Perchtoldsdorf; Austria
- Coordinates: 48°07′23″N 16°17′08″E
- Owner: ÖBB
- Operator: ÖBB
- Platforms: 2 side
- Tracks: 2

Services
Preceding station	Vienna S-Bahn	Following station
Brunn-Maria Enzersdorf towards Mödling	S2	Wien Liesing towards Laa an der Thaya
Brunn-Maria Enzersdorf towards Wiener Neustadt Hbf	S3	Wien Liesing towards Hollabrunn
Brunn-Maria Enzersdorf towards Wiener Neustadt Hbf	S4	Wien Liesing towards Absdorf-Hippersdorf
Location
- Location within Austria

Perchtoldsdorf is a railway station serving the town of Perchtoldsdorf in Lower Austria.
