= Pilgramgasse station =

Vienna U-Bahn station

Coordinates: 48°11′33″N 16°21′16″E

Pilgramgasse

General information
- Owner: Wiener Linien
- Platforms: 2 (side platforms)
- Tracks: 2

History
- Opened: 1980
- Rebuilt: 1996

Services
Preceding station	Wiener Linien	Following station
Margaretengürtel toward Hütteldorf	U4	Kettenbrückengasse toward Heiligenstadt
Location

Pilgramgasse is a station on the Vienna U-Bahn line U4. It is located in Margareten between Ramperstorffergasse and the eponymous street, which is named after Franz Anton Pilgram (1699–1761), an Austrian Baroque architect. The station is in an open cut parallel to the River Wien and curves to match the curve of the river.

== History ==
The station originally opened in 1899 as part of the Vienna Valley line (Wientallinie) of the Vienna Stadtbahn. With the rest of the Stadtbahn network, it was closed in 1918 and reopened in 1925 after electrification. It was served by the WD (Wiental) line until the 1970s. Conversion to a U-Bahn station began on 27 October 1980.

The station has two side platforms. At the Pilgramgasse end, it is accessed via the restored Otto Wagner building, which has stairs. There is access via lift at the Ramperstorffergasse end, where a new building was constructed in 1996 during a programme of renovations by Wiener Linien to improve accessibility, because the Otto Wagner building is protected and so could not have a lift built into it. The lifts opened for service on 8 November 1996 but will be out of service until the completion of the U2 station due to construction works in the area.

Between 3 February 2019 and 31 January 2020, the station was closed for reconstruction, related to U2 line extension to Matzleinsdorfer Platz.

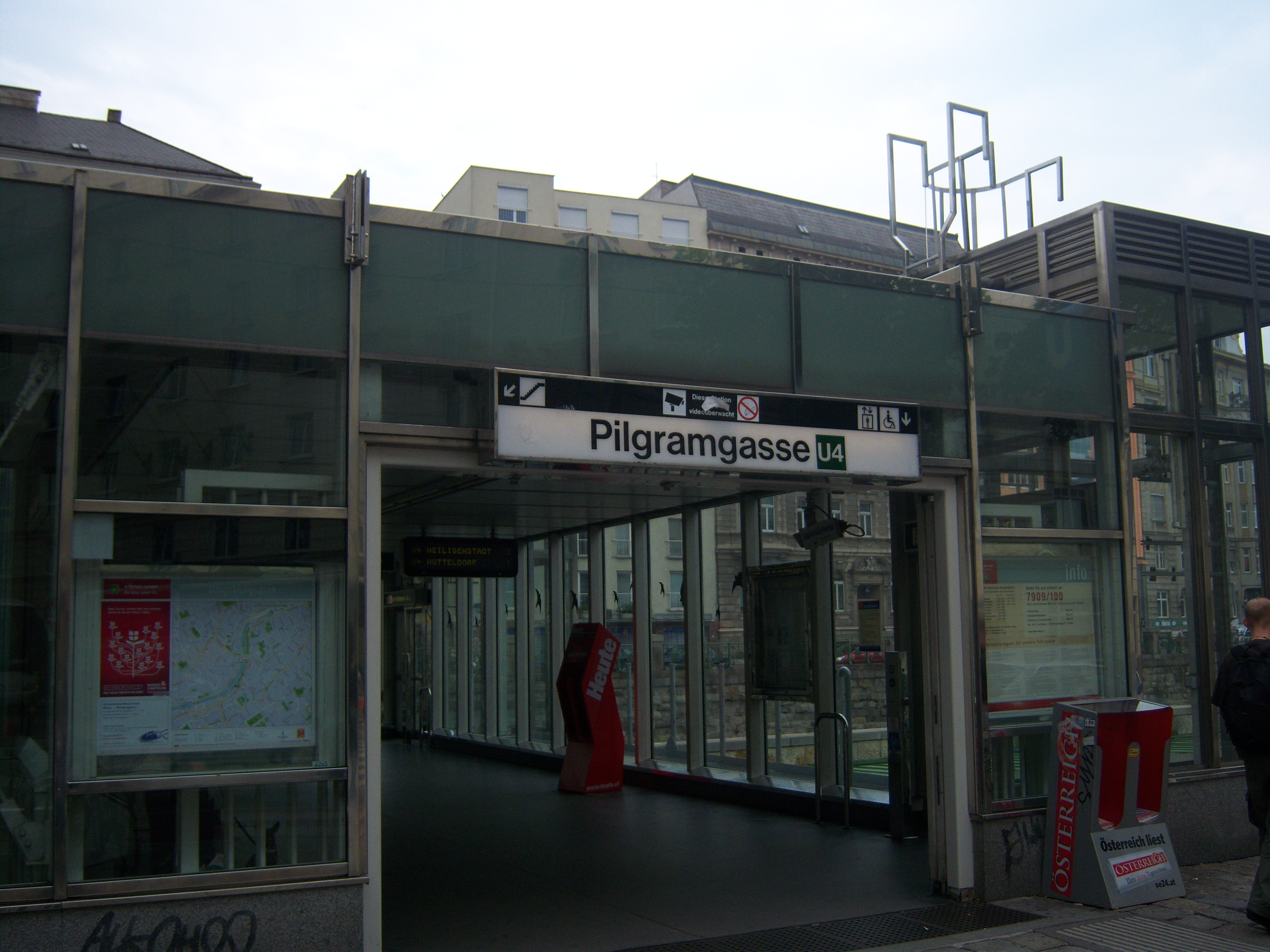
New building on outbound side

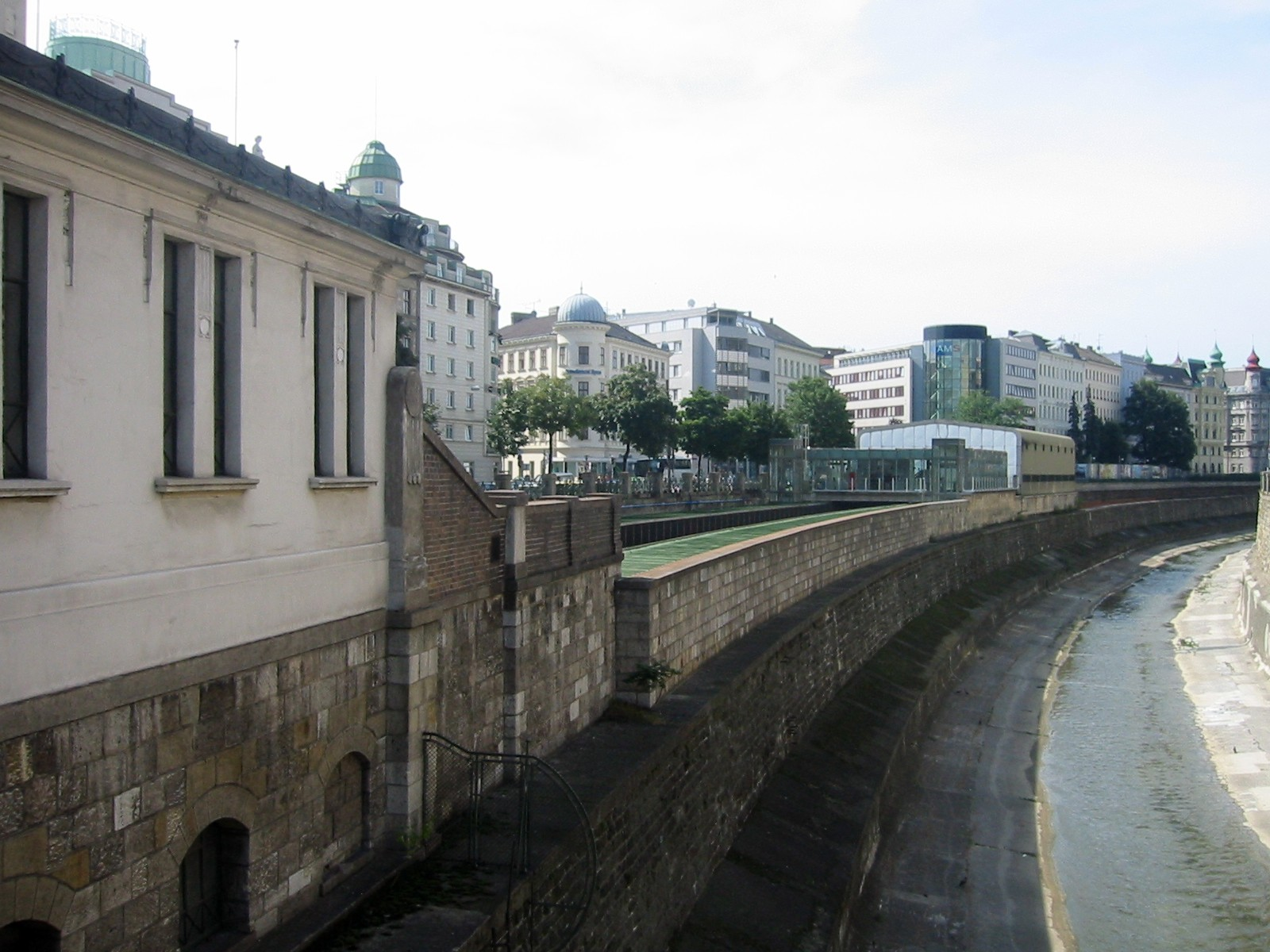
River Wien behind the station

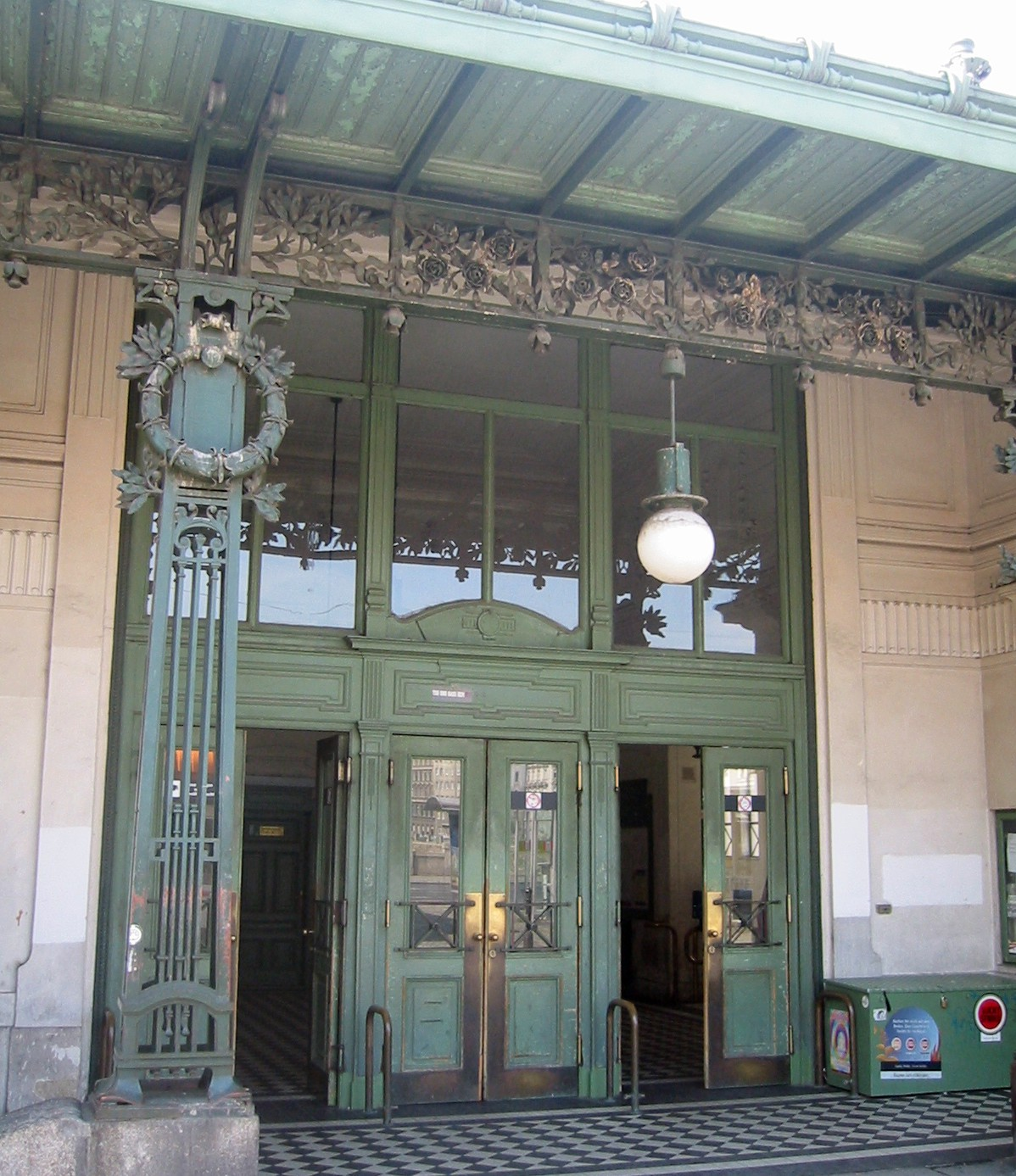
Entrance to the Otto Wagner building on inbound side
