= Wien Hetzendorf railway station =

Railway station in Vienna, Austria

Wien Hetzendorf
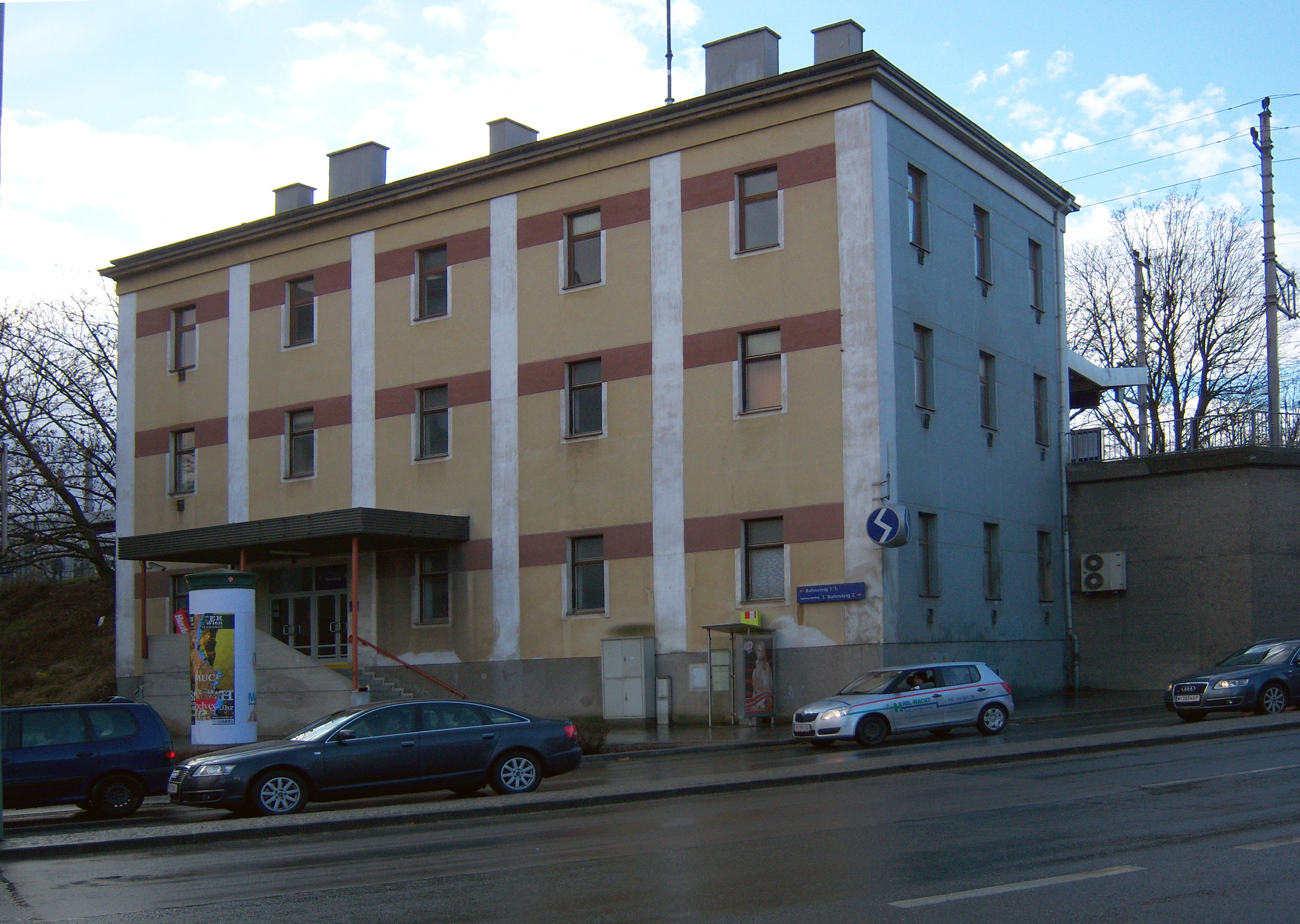

General information
- Location: Eckartsaugasse 2 Austria
- Coordinates: 48°08′05″N 16°17′02″E
- System: S-Bahn station
- Owner: ÖBB
- Operator: ÖBB
- Platforms: 2 side platforms
- Tracks: 2

Construction
- Cycle facilities: Yes
- Accessible: No

Other information
- Fare zone: Core Zone (100)

History
- Opened: 1849
- Electrified: 15 kV 16,7 Hz

Services
Preceding station	Vienna S-Bahn	Following station
Wien Atzgersdorf towards Mödling	S2	Wien Meidling towards Laa an der Thaya
Wien Atzgersdorf towards Wiener Neustadt Hbf	S3	Wien Meidling towards Hollabrunn
Wien Atzgersdorf towards Wiener Neustadt Hbf	S4	Wien Meidling towards Absdorf-Hippersdorf
Location
- Location within Austria

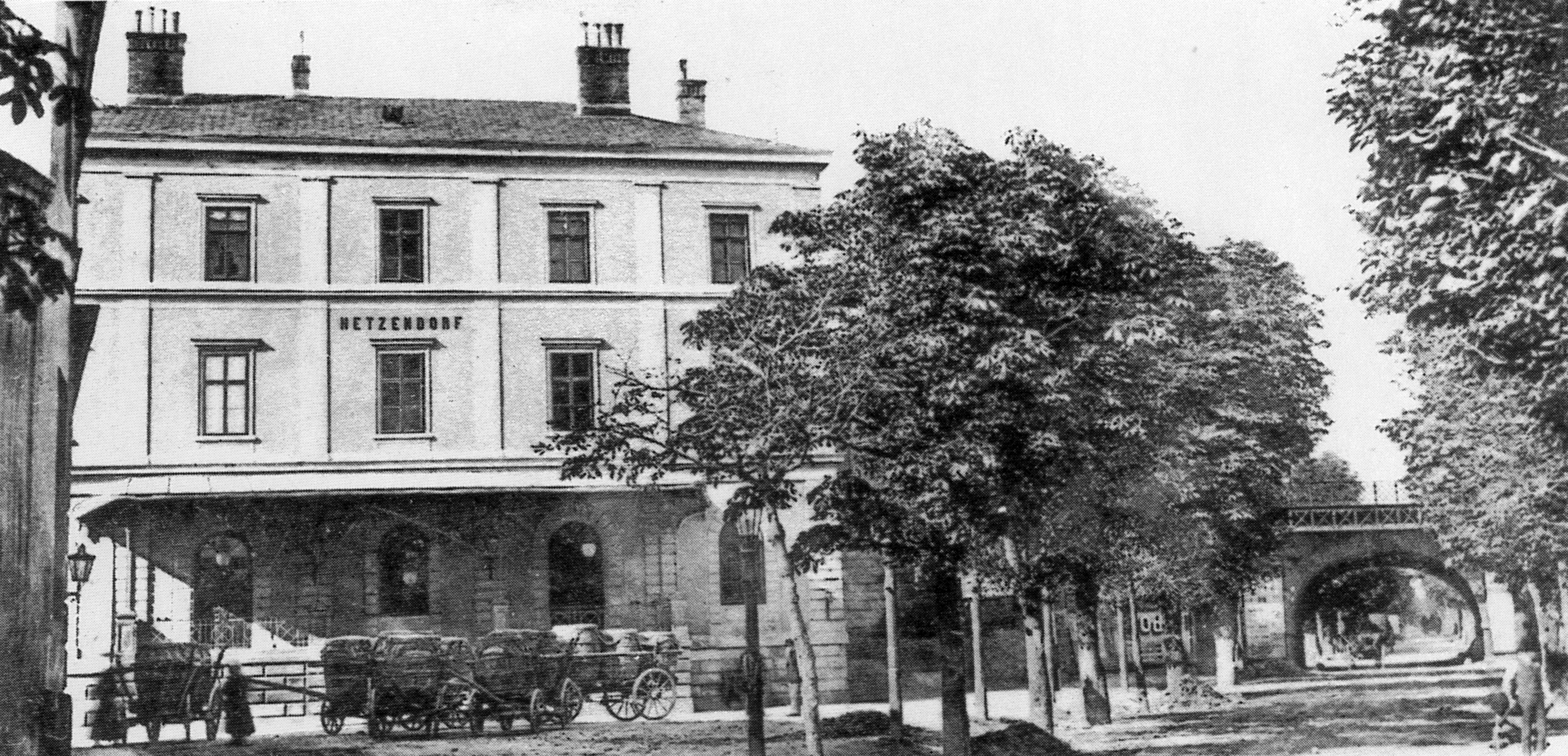
Railway station Hetzendorf in 1897

Wien Hetzendorf is a Vienna S-Bahn station, served by S1 and S2. The station is 1.63 km (1.01 mi) west of Wien Meidling. The station is situated between Altmannsdorfer Straße and Hetzendorfer Straße. Connections are available to Lines 16A, 62A, 64A of Wiener Linien Bus service and Line 62 of Wiener Linien Tram service.

== History ==
The railway station was opened in June 1841 as a part of the railroad from Vienna to Gloggnitz in Lower Austria. The first steam locomotive using the new railroad was built by the Norris Locomotive Works in Philadelphia, Pennsylvania in 1837 and brought to Vienna. The locomotive was named Philadelphia and a bridge across the railroad between the railway stations Wien Meidling and Wien Hetzendorf is called Philadelphiabrücke up to now in commemoration of the early days of that railroad. It was completed as the Southern Railway in Austria until 1857 to reach the harbour of Trieste, then part of the Austrian Empire.

The railway station gained importance when the later Emperor Charles I of Austria lived close to the station in Schloss Hetzendorf. The station was also the best connection from Schönbrunn Palace to the south.
