= Wien Atzgersdorf railway station =

Railway station in Vienna, Austria

Wien Atzgersdorf
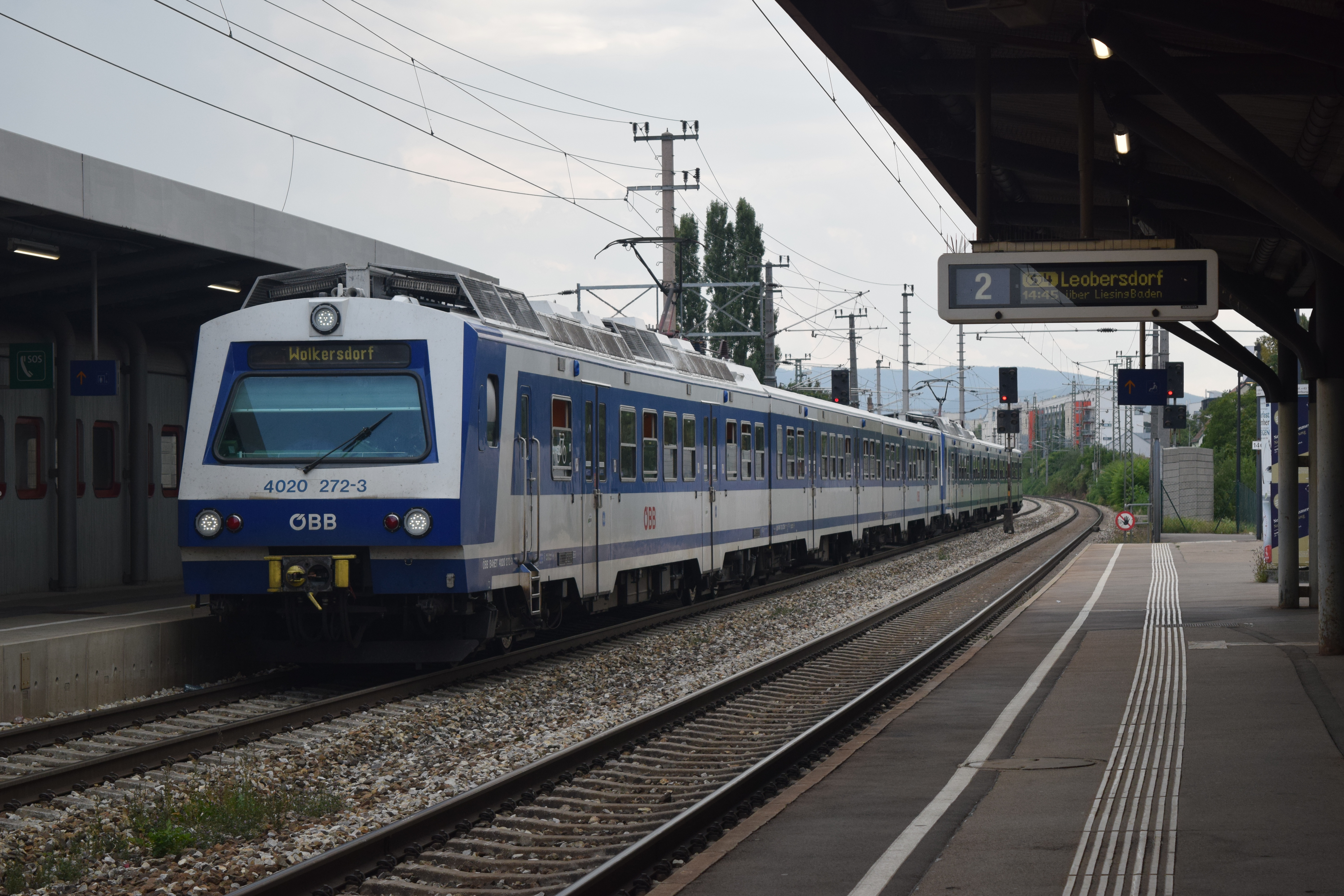

General information
- Location: 1230 Vienna; Austria
- Coordinates: 48°08′49″N 16°17′19″E
- Owner: ÖBB
- Operator: ÖBB
- Platforms: 1 side, 1 island
- Tracks: 3

Services
Preceding station	Vienna S-Bahn	Following station
Wien Liesing towards Mödling	S2	Wien Hetzendorf towards Laa an der Thaya
Wien Liesing towards Wiener Neustadt Hbf	S3	Wien Hetzendorf towards Hollabrunn
Wien Liesing towards Wiener Neustadt Hbf	S4	Wien Hetzendorf towards Absdorf-Hippersdorf
Location
- Location within Austria

Wien Atzgersdorf is a railway station serving Atzgersdorf in the 23rd District of Vienna.
