= Wien Meidling =

Wien Meidling may refer to:

- Meidling, the 12th district of Vienna
- Wien Meidling railway station, one of Vienna's main railway stations located at the Philadelphiabrücke.
