= Wien Meidling railway station =

Railway station in Vienna, Austria

Wien Meidling
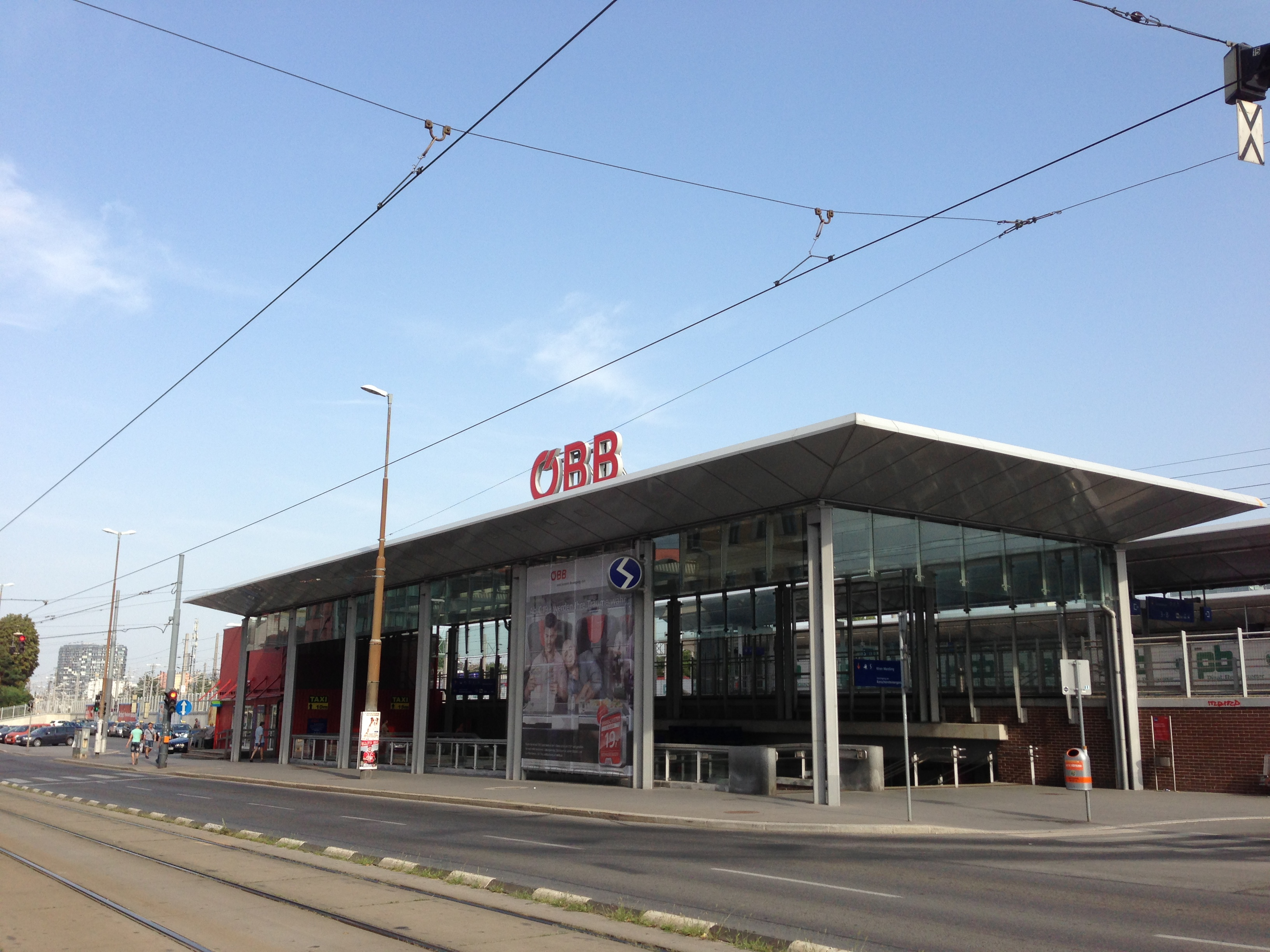
- The eastern station entrance in 2013

General information
- Location: Eichenstraße 25; Vienna; Austria
- Coordinates: 48°10′30″N 16°20′06″E
- Owner: ÖBB
- Lines: Southern Railway; Pottendorfer Line; Verbindungsbahn
- Platforms: 4 island platforms
- Tracks: 8
- Train operators: ÖBB
- Connections: Vienna U-Bahn: Trams: 62; Bus: 7A, 7B, 8A, 9A, 15A, 59A, 62A, N62, N64, Vienna Airport Lines

History
- Opened: 20 June 1841
Services
Preceding station	ÖBB	Following station
St. Pölten Hbf towards Zürich HB	Railjet Express	Wien Hbf towards Bratislava hl.st.
St. Pölten Hbf towards Zürich HB	Railjet Express	Wien Hbf towards Budapest Keleti
St. Pölten Hbf towards München Hbf	Railjet Express	Wien Hbf towards Budapest Keleti
St. Pölten Hbf towards München Hbf	Railjet Express	Wien Hbf Terminus
St. Pölten Hbf towards Zürich HB	Railjet Express	Wien Hbf towards Vienna Airport
St. Pölten Hbf towards Innsbruck Hbf	Railjet Express	Wien Hbf towards Vienna Airport
St. Pölten Hbf towards Bregenz	Railjet Express	Wien Hbf towards Vienna Airport
Wiener Neustadt Hbf towards Graz Hbf	Railjet	Wien Hbf towards Berlin-Charlottenburg
Wiener Neustadt Hbf towards Graz Hbf	Railjet	Wien Hbf towards Praha hl.n.
Wiener Neustadt Hbf towards Villach Hbf	Railjet	Wien Hbf Terminus
Wiener Neustadt Hbf towards Venezia Santa Lucia	Railjet	Wien Hbf Terminus
Tullnerfeld towards Salzburg Hbf	Railjet	Wien Hbf Terminus
Wiener Neustadt Hbf towards Graz Hbf	Railjet	Wien Hbf towards Vienna Airport
Tullnerfeld towards Klagenfurt Hbf	Railjet	Wien Hbf towards Vienna Airport
Wiener Neustadt Hbf towards Graz Hbf	EuroCity	Wien Hbf towards Przemyśl Główny
Wiener Neustadt Hbf towards Trieste Centrale	EuroCity	Wien Hbf Terminus
St. Pölten Hbf towards Stainach-Irdning	InterCity	Wien Hbf Terminus
Tullnerfeld towards Stuttgart Hbf	InterCity	Wien Hbf Terminus
Wiener Neustadt Hbf towards Lienz	InterCity	Wien Hbf Terminus
Wiener Neustadt Hbf towards Villach Hbf	InterCity	Wien Hbf Terminus
St. Pölten Hbf towards Zürich HB or Stuttgart Hbf	EuroNight	Wien Hbf towards Budapest Keleti
Wiener Neustadt Hbf towards Roma Termini or La Spezia Centrale	Nightjet	Wien Hbf Terminus
St. Pölten Hbf towards Amsterdam Centraal or Hamburg-Altona	Nightjet	Wien Hbf Terminus
Tullnerfeld towards Bregenz	Nightjet	Wien Hbf Terminus
St. Pölten Hbf towards Zürich HB or Venezia Santa Lucia	Nightjet	Wien Hbf Terminus
St. Pölten Hbf towards Bischofshofen	ÖBB-Urlaubsexpress Limited service	Wien Hbf Terminus
Wien Liesing towards Payerbach-Reichenau	REX 1	Wien Matzleinsdorfer Platz towards Břeclav
Wien Speising towards Wien Westbahnhof	REX 2	Wien Matzleinsdorfer Platz towards Laa an der Thaya
Wien Liesing towards Wiener Neustadt Hbf	REX 3	Wien Matzleinsdorfer Platz towards Satov
Wiener Neustadt Hbf towards Payerbach-Reichenau	REX 9	Wien Hbf Terminus
Preceding station	DB Fernverkehr	Following station
St. Pölten Hbf towards Dortmund Hbf	ICE 91	Wien Hbf Terminus
Preceding station	PKP Intercity	Following station
St. Pölten Hbf towards München Hbf	EuroNight	Wien Hbf towards Warszawa Wschodnia
Preceding station	Vienna S-Bahn	Following station
Terminus	S1	Wien Matzleinsdorfer Platz towards Marchegg
Wien Hetzendorf towards Mödling	S2	Wien Matzleinsdorfer Platz towards Laa an der Thaya
Wien Hetzendorf towards Wiener Neustadt Hbf	S3	Wien Matzleinsdorfer Platz towards Hollabrunn
Wien Hetzendorf towards Wiener Neustadt Hbf	S4	Wien Matzleinsdorfer Platz towards Absdorf-Hippersdorf
Wien Blumental towards Wiener Neustadt Hbf	S60	Wien Hbf towards Bruck an der Leitha
Wien Speising towards Wien Hütteldorf	S80	Wien Hbf towards Wien Aspern Nord
Location

Wien Meidling (German for 'Vienna Meidling') is one of Vienna's main railway stations located at the Philadelphiabrücke. When the Südbahnhof (South station) was demolished in December 2009 to build Vienna's new Hauptbahnhof (main station), Wien Meidling assumed the functions of the Südbahnhof and has been in the 2020s frequented by 55,000 people daily, up from its usual 45,000, making it one of Austria's busiest railway stations.

== Train services ==
The station is served by the following services:

- Intercity Express services (ICE 91) Hamburg - Hanover - Kassel - Nürnberg - Passau - Linz - St Pölten - Vienna - Vienna Airport
- Intercity Express services (ICE 91) Dortmund - Essen - Düsseldorf - Cologne - Koblenz - Frankfurt - Nürnberg - Passau - Linz - St Pölten - Vienna - Vienna Airport
- RailJet services Zürich - Innsbruck - Salzburg - Linz - St Pölten - Vienna - Győr - Budapest
- RailJet services Munich - Salzburg - Linz - St Pölten - Vienna - Győr - Budapest
- RailJet services Frankfurt - Stuttgart - Munich - Salzburg - Linz - St Pölten - Vienna - Győr - Budapest
- RailJet services Graz - Vienna - Breclav - Brno - Pardubice - Prague
- RailJet services Villach - Klagenfurt - Vienna
- EuroCity services Vienna - Győr - Budapest - Kiskunmajsa - Novi Sad - Belgrade
- EuroCity services Vienna - Győr - Budapest - Debrecen
- EuroCity services Vienna - Breclav - Ostrava - Katowice - Warsaw
- EuroCity services Zagreb - Maribor - Graz - Vienna
- EuroNight services Rome - Florence - Bologna - Venice - Villach - Klagenfurt - Vienna

== See also ==
- Rail transport in Austria
