= Brunn-Maria Enzersdorf railway station =

Railway station in Lower Austria

Brunn-Maria Enzersdorf
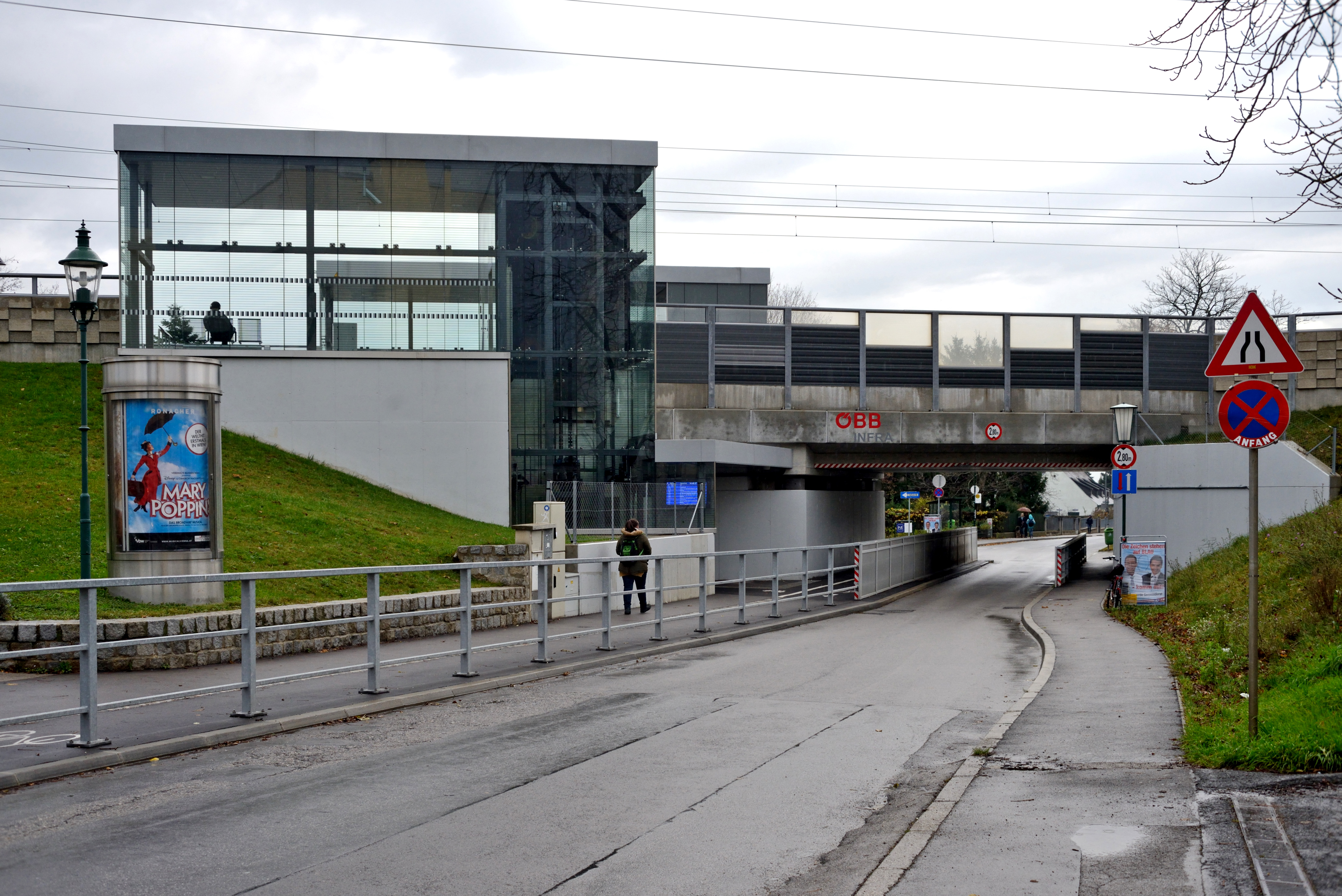

General information
- Location: Bahnstraße; 2345 Brunn am Gebirge; Austria
- Coordinates: 48°06′19″N 16°17′17″E
- Owner: ÖBB
- Operator: ÖBB
- Platforms: 2 side
- Tracks: 2

Services
Preceding station	Vienna S-Bahn	Following station
Mödling Terminus	S2	Perchtoldsdorf towards Laa an der Thaya
Mödling towards Wiener Neustadt Hbf	S3	Perchtoldsdorf towards Hollabrunn
Mödling towards Wiener Neustadt Hbf	S4	Perchtoldsdorf towards Absdorf-Hippersdorf
Location
- Location within Austria

Brunn-Maria Enzersdorf is a railway station serving the town of Brunn am Gebirge in Lower Austria.
