= Wien Matzleinsdorfer Platz railway station =

Railway station in Vienna, Austria

Wien Matzleinsdorfer Platz
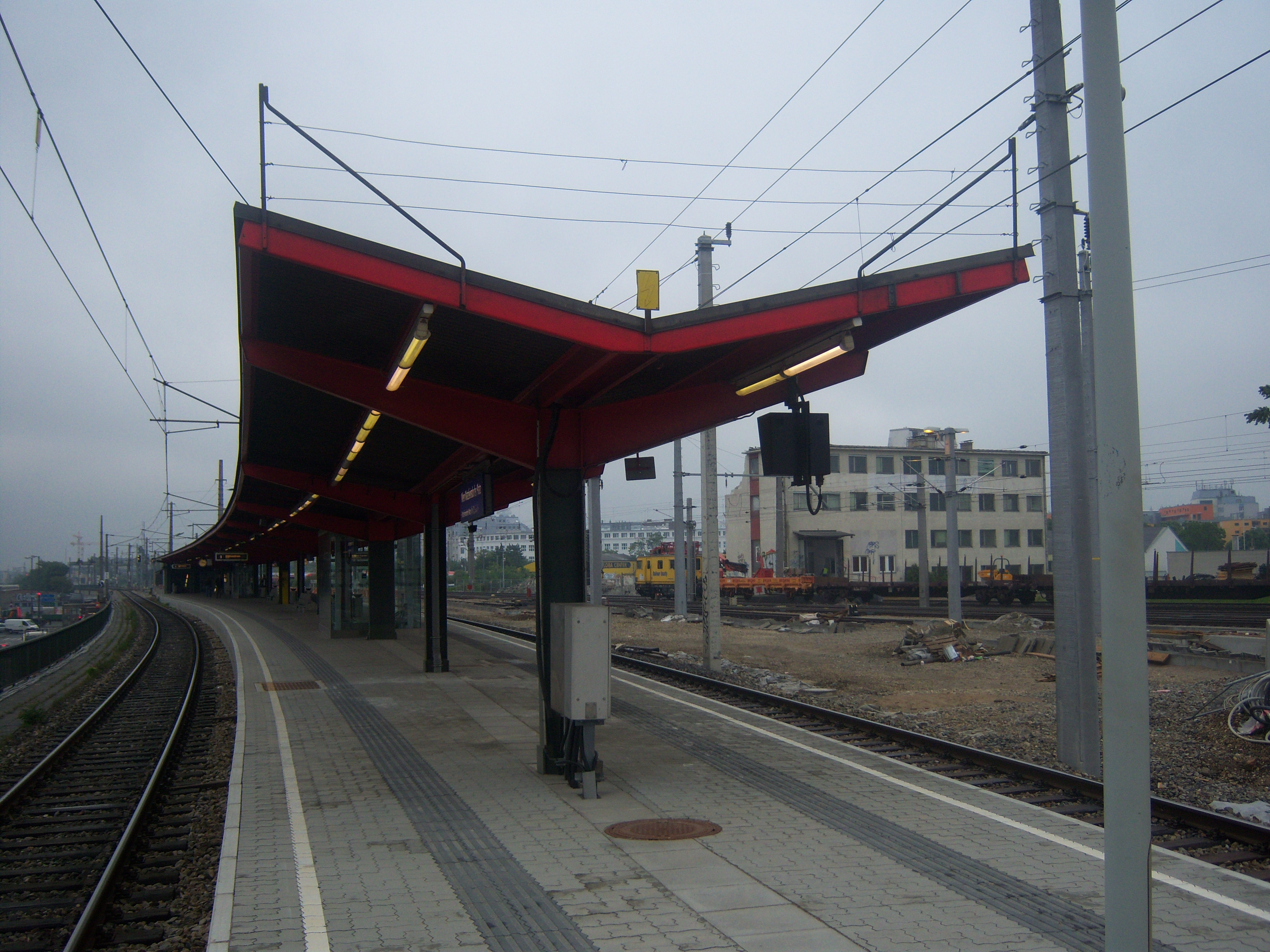

General information
- Location: 1050 Vienna; Austria
- Coordinates: 48°10′50″N 16°21′32″E
- System: S-Bahn and Regional rail station
- Owner: ÖBB
- Operator: ÖBB
- Line: Verbindungsbahn
- Platforms: 1 Island platform
- Tracks: 2

Construction
- Structure type: Elevated
- Parking: No
- Accessible: Yes

Other information
- Station code: MP
- Fare zone: Core Zone (100)

History
- Opened: 1969
- Electrified: 15 kV 16,7 Hz

Services
Preceding station	Vienna S-Bahn	Following station
Wien Meidling Terminus	S1	Wien Hbf towards Marchegg
Wien Meidling towards Mödling	S2	Wien Hbf towards Laa an der Thaya
Wien Meidling towards Wiener Neustadt Hbf	S3	Wien Hbf towards Hollabrunn
Wien Meidling towards Wiener Neustadt Hbf	S4	Wien Hbf towards Absdorf-Hippersdorf
Wien Meidling towards Wien Hütteldorf	S80	Wien Hbf towards Wien Aspern Nord
Location
- Location within Austria

Wien Matzleinsdorfer Platz is a commuter rail station in Favoriten, Vienna. The station is served by S-Bahn trains and regional trains that use the trunk line.

The station was opened in 1969 above Matzleinsdorfer Platz. Connections are available to tram and bus services. Vienna's first moving sidewalk was opened here to connect the station to the nearby underground tram station. The station closed temporarily on the 27th March 2021 as part of the extension of the U2 underground line. The renovation works are expected to be completed in April 2022.

== Connections ==
=== Trams ===
- 1: Prater Hauptallee - Stefan-Fadinger Platz
- 6: Burggasse-Stadthalle - Kaiserebersdorf
- 18: Burggasse-Stadthalle - Schlachthausgasse
- 62: Oper, Karlsplatz - Lainz, Wolkersbergerstraße
- WLB: Wien Oper - Baden

=== City Busses ===
- 14A: Neubaugasse - Reumannplatz
- N6: Westbahnhof - Enkplatz
- N62: Kärntner Ring, Oper - Hermesstraße
