= Kettenbrückengasse station =

Vienna U-Bahn station

Kettenbrückengasse
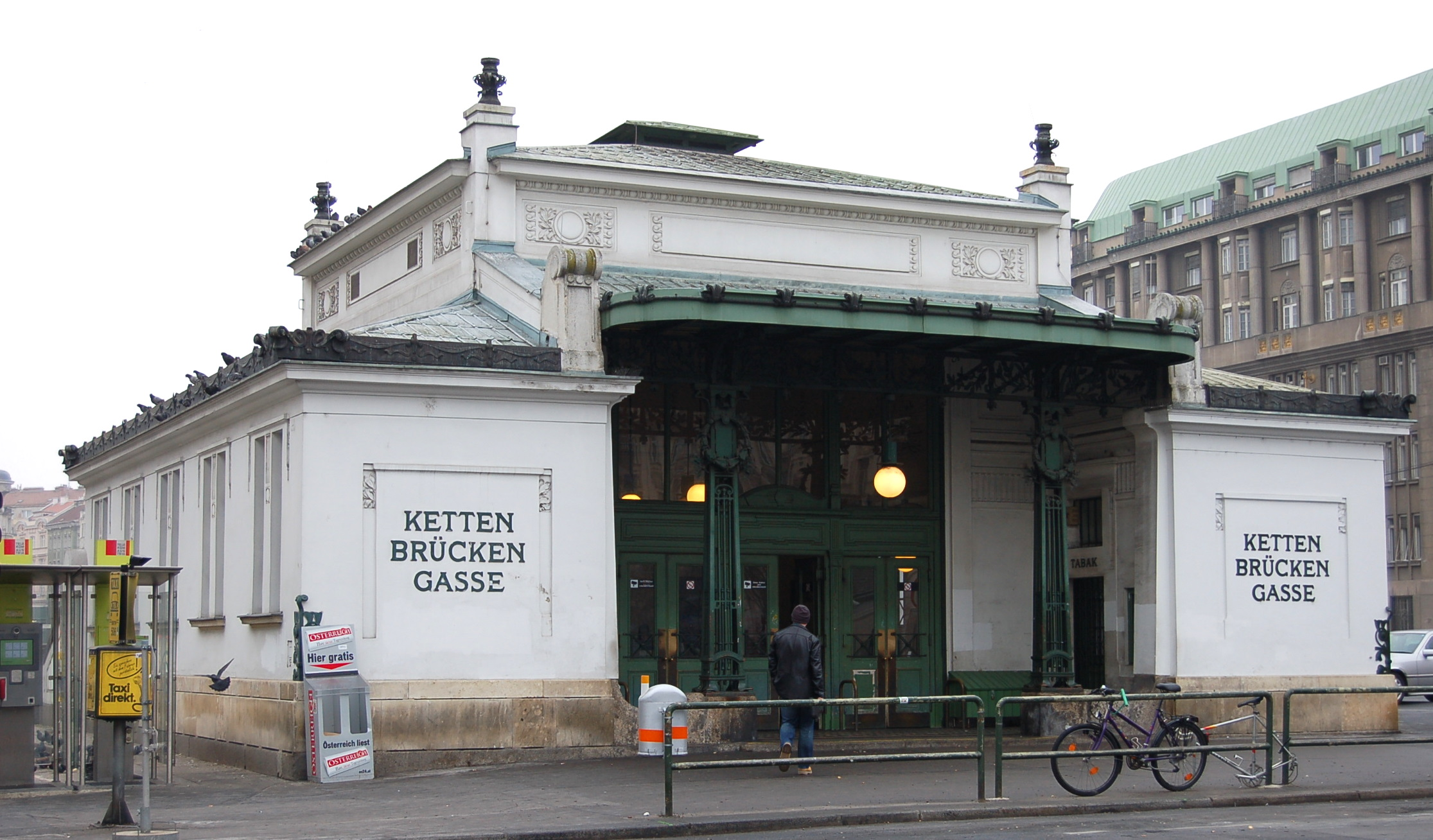

General information
- Location: Margareten, Vienna; Austria
- Coordinates: 48.1966°N 16.3580°E
- Platforms: 2 (2 side platforms)
- Tracks: 2

Construction
- Structure type: Below-grade
- Depth: 4 m (13 ft)
- Platform levels: 2
- Parking: Yes
- Cycle facilities: Yes

History
- Opened: 1899

Services
Preceding station	Wiener Linien	Following station
Pilgramgasse toward Hütteldorf	U4	Karlsplatz toward Heiligenstadt
Location

Kettenbrückengasse is a station on U4 of the Vienna U-Bahn. It is located in the Margareten District. It opened on the Wiener Stadtbahn in 1899 and became an U-Bahn station in 1980.
