= Tullnerfeld railway station =

Railway station in Lower Austria

Tullnerfeld
- Northern side of the railway station in 2012

General information
- Location: Bahnhofsring 50; 3451 Pixendorf; Austria
- Coordinates: 48°17′42″N 15°59′48″E
- Owner: ÖBB
- Operator: ÖBB
- Lines: Western Railway; Tullnerfeld Railway
- Platforms: 5

History
- Opened: 9 December 2012

Services
Preceding station	ÖBB	Following station
St. Pölten Hbf towards Amstetten	CJX 5	Wien Hütteldorf towards Wien Westbahnhof
Preceding station	Vienna S-Bahn	Following station
Michelhausen towards St. Pölten Hbf	S40	Tulln Stadt towards Wien FJB
Location
- Location within Austria

Tullnerfeld is a green field railway station in the Tulln Basin in Lower Austria. Located along the Western Railway, it is served by regional and high speed trains of ÖBB.

== Location ==
The station is located in the countryside between the villages of Judenau, Michelhausen and Langenrohr.

== History ==
In the 1990s plans were made to re-route the Western Railway between Vienna and St. Pölten. The new four-track high speed route was to pass through the Tulln Basin, further north than the old tracks which passed through the Vienna Woods. In the planning phase the idea of an additional station in the Tulln basin came up and was realized against fierce resistance. The station was opened on 9 December 2012, followed by a building boom around the station. The station became popular with commuters who worked in Vienna, a development that was sped up by the introduction of parking fees in Vienna which happened at almost the same time as the station opening.

The station and the railway were damaged by floods in mid-September 2024. The station remained closed until 4 November 2024 with services to St. Pölten resuming only on 15 December 2024.
