= Wien Speising railway station =

Railway station in Vienna, Austria

Wien Speising
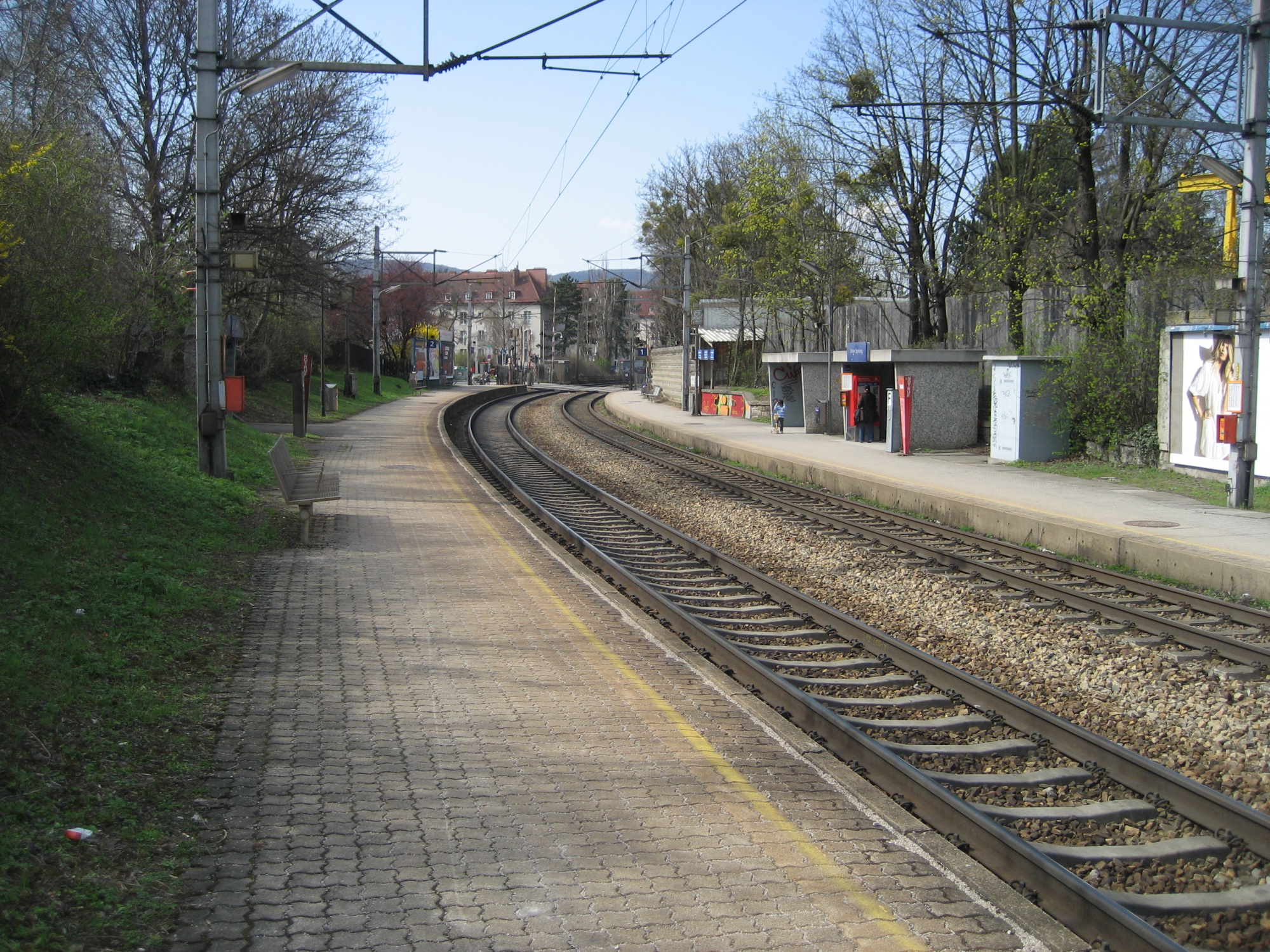

General information
- Location: 1130 Vienna; Austria
- Owner: ÖBB
- Line: Verbindungsbahn
- Platforms: 2 side platforms
- Tracks: 2
- Train operators: ÖBB

Services
Preceding station	Vienna S-Bahn	Following station
Wien Hütteldorf Terminus	S80	Wien Meidling towards Wien Aspern Nord
Location

Wien Speising is a railway station serving Hietzing, the thirteenth district of Vienna.
