= R 510/900 =

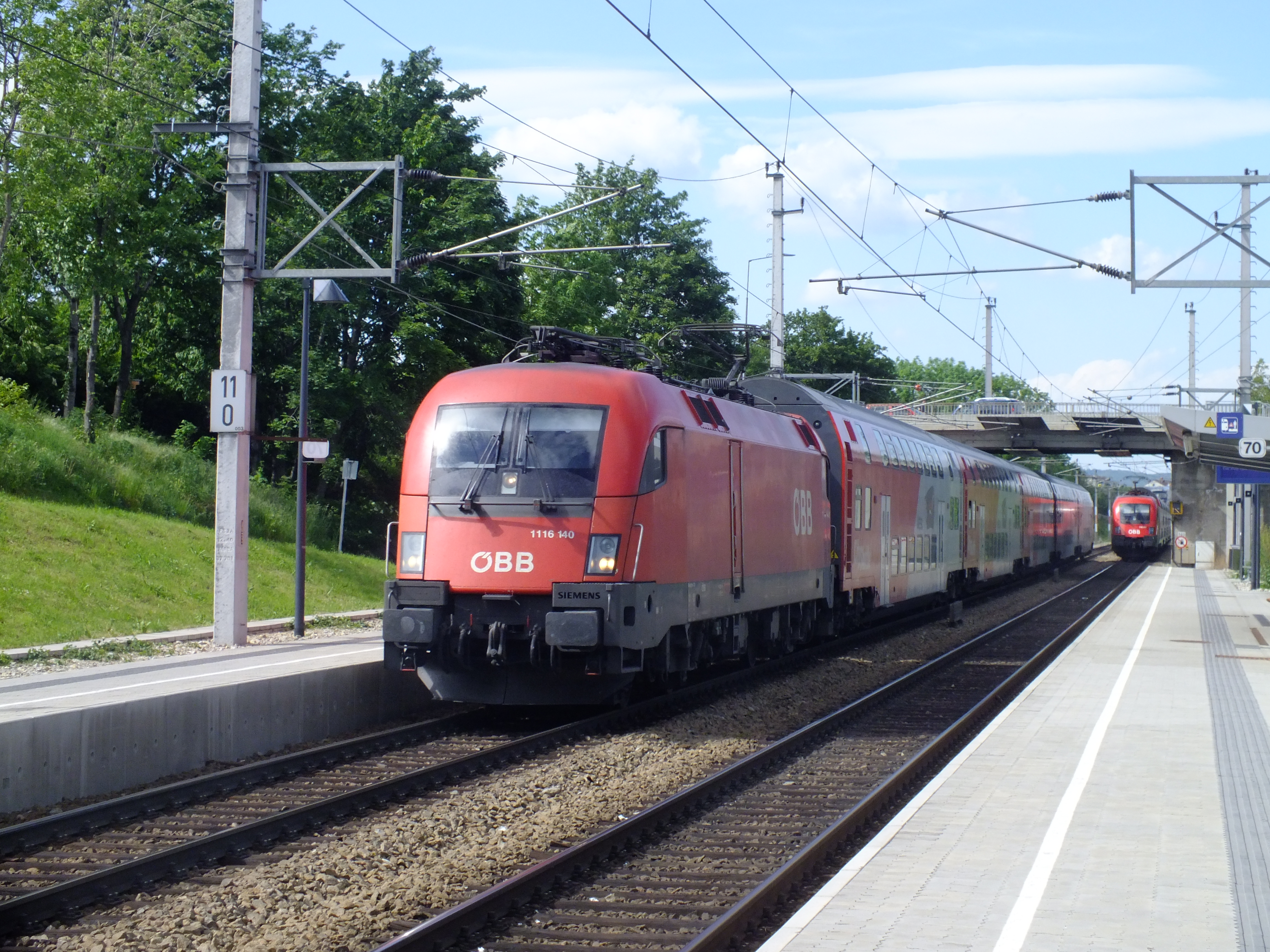
- Wiener Neustadt bound R 2343 passing Perchtoldsdorf with ÖBB Class 1116-140 leading..

Overview
- Status: Operating
- Owner: ÖBB
- Locale: Vienna, Lower Austria
- Termini: Wiener Neustadt; Bernhardsthal Břeclav
- Stations: 17

Service
- Type: Commuter rail
- System: ÖBB/VOR

Technical
- Number of tracks: 2
- Track gauge: 1,435 mm (4 ft 8 1/2 in) standard gauge

R 510/900 is a commuter/regional rail service operating between Wiener Neustadt and Bernhardsthal with extended service to Břeclav in the Czech Republic. R 510 and R 900 are two separate services that run interchangeably allowing direct service between the two points. The service is operated by the Austrian Federal Railways (ÖBB) in cooperation with VOR (Eastern Region Transportation Authority). R 510 begins at Wiener Neustadt Hauptbahnhof (Central station) in the south and travels to Vienna along the Southern Railway (Südbahn), the busiest railway in Austria. North of Vienna, most trains switch to the R 900 route. R 900 service uses the Northern Railway (Nordbahn) to Bernhardsthal and Břeclav.

== Service ==
R 510 offers 24 trains daily between Vienna and Wiener Neustadt (excluding R 500 service). 10 of these trains continue on to Bernhardsthal while 2 continue all the way to Břeclav. Trains operate between 4:50 and 22:40.

R 500 operates trains further southwest to Payerbach-Reichenau using the same route. The combined R500 and R 510 service operates half-hourly (quarter-hourly during rush hours) service between Vienna and Wiener Neustadt. R 510 trains operate as expresses, between the two cities, making limited stops whereas local service is offered by the S1 and S2 of the Vienna S-Bahn. R 510 route ends at Wien Floridsdorf in Northern Vienna and R 900 route begins. Some R 510 trains end at Floridsdorf and head back to Wiener Neustadt while others continue to Bernhardsthal and some continue to Retz (R 510/903 service). There are two daily R 510/900 trains operating directly between Wiener Neustadt and Břeclav, however all other service between the two cities is offered by R 500/900 service.

R 900 offers 13 trains daily between Bernhardsthal and Vienna along with 3 trains from Břeclav (excluding R 500/900 service).Trains operate between 4:30 and 20:33. R 510/900 operates express service between Vienna and Gänserndorf, while S1 of the Vienna S-Bahn operates local service. After Gänserndorf, trains make all stops to Bernhardsthal/Břeclav.
