= Tulln Basin =

Alluvial plain in Lower Austria

The Tulln Basin (German: Tullnerfeld) is a sedimentary basin north to the Eastern Alps, thrown up by the river Danube.

== Geography ==
The fairly level area is a fertile alluvial plain and has the shape of a spindle, over an area of 48 km (30 mi) by 14 km (8.7 mi). The Danube enters the basin at Krems an der Donau and it leaves at Korneuburg. The basin is a settled ground filled with tertiary sediments and rubbly deposits of the Danube and other rivers of the Alpine Foreland. Its fertile terraces are farmed with wheat, maize, potatoes and sugar beet.
