= St. Pölten Hauptbahnhof =

Railway station in Lower Austria

St. Pölten Hbf.
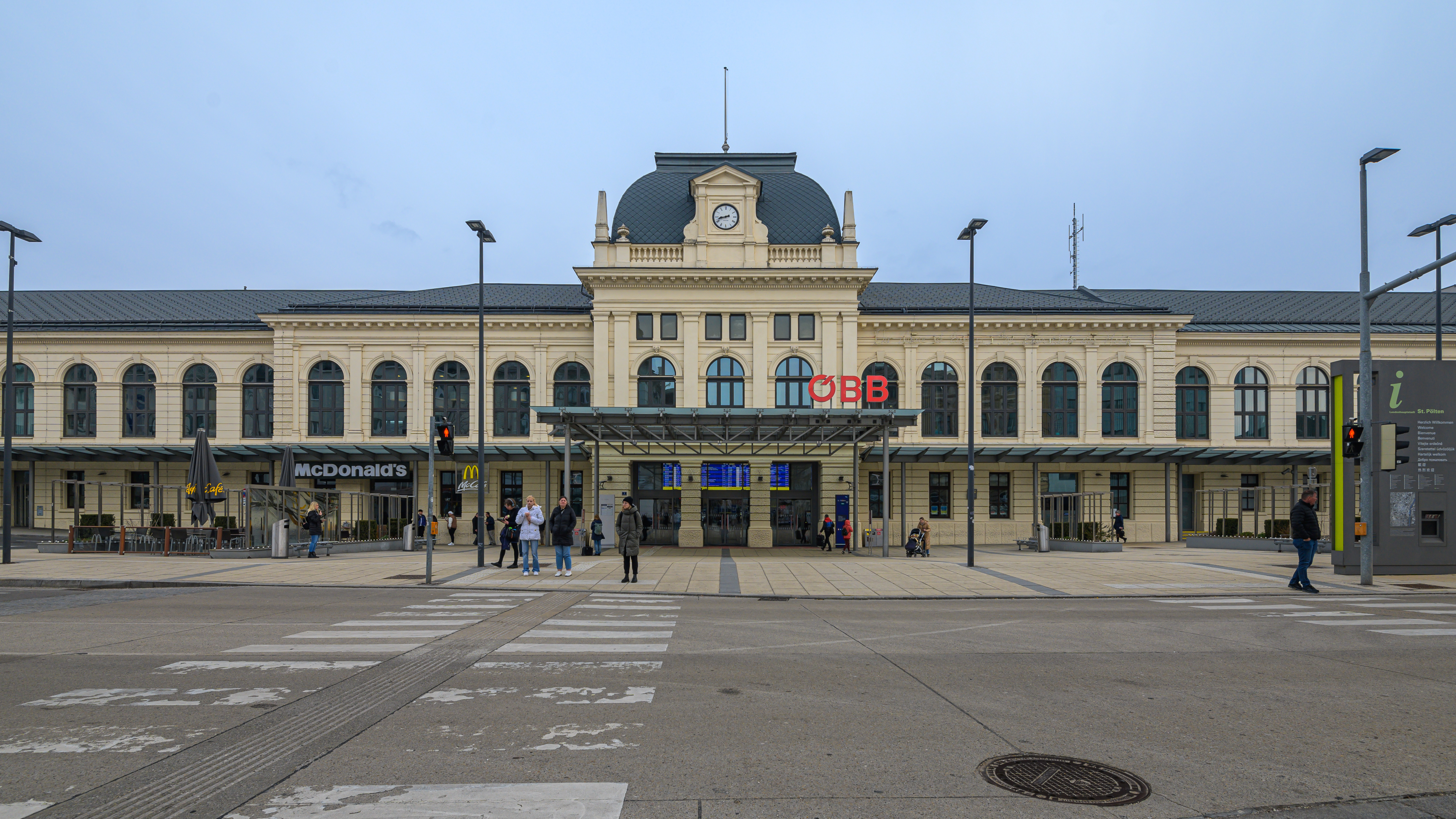
- Main entrance, in 2023

General information
- Location: Bahnhofplatz; 3100 St. Pölten; Austria
- Coordinates: 48°12′29″N 15°37′26″E
- Owner: Austrian Federal Railways (ÖBB)
- Operator: Austrian Federal Railways (ÖBB)
- Lines: Western Railway; Tullnerfeld Railway; Leobersdorf Railway; Mariazell Railway
- Platforms: 9

History
- Opened: 1858
Services
Preceding station	ÖBB	Following station
Linz Hbf towards Zürich HB	Railjet Express	Wien Meidling towards Bratislava hl.st.
Linz Hbf towards Zürich HB	Railjet Express	Wien Meidling towards Vienna Airport
Linz Hbf towards Zürich HB	Railjet Express	Wien Meidling towards Budapest Keleti
Linz Hbf towards München Hbf	Railjet Express	Wien Meidling towards Wien Hbf
Linz Hbf towards München Hbf	Railjet Express	Wien Meidling towards Budapest Keleti
Linz Hbf towards Innsbruck Hbf	Railjet Express	Wien Meidling towards Vienna Airport
Linz Hbf towards Bregenz	Railjet Express	Wien Meidling towards Vienna Airport
Amstetten towards Salzburg Hbf	Railjet	Tullnerfeld towards Wien Hbf
Linz Hbf towards Zürich HB or Stuttgart Hbf	EuroNight	Wien Meidling towards Budapest Keleti
Linz Hbf towards Amsterdam Centraal or Hamburg-Altona	Nightjet	Wien Meidling towards Wien Hbf
Amstetten towards Bregenz	Nightjet	Tullnerfeld towards Wien Hbf
Amstetten towards Zürich HB or Venezia Santa Lucia	Nightjet	Wien Meidling towards Wien Hbf
Linz Hbf towards Bischofshofen	ÖBB-Urlaubsexpress Limited service	Wien Meidling towards Wien Hbf
Prinzersdorf towards Amstetten	CJX 5	Tullnerfeld towards Wien Westbahnhof
Terminus	REX 51	Pottenbrun towards Wien Westbahnhof
Preceding station	DB Fernverkehr	Following station
Linz Hbf towards Dortmund Hbf	ICE 91	Wien Meidling towards Wien Hbf
Preceding station		Following station
Amstetten toward München Hbf	WESTgreen	Wien Hütteldorf toward Wien Westbahnhof
Preceding station	PKP Intercity	Following station
Linz Hbf towards München Hbf	EuroNight	Wien Meidling towards Warszawa Wschodnia
Preceding station	Vienna S-Bahn	Following station
Terminus	S40	St. Pölten Traisenpark towards Wien FJB
Location
- Location within Austria

St. Pölten Hauptbahnhof is the main railway station at St. Pölten, which is the capital city of the federal state of Lower Austria, located in the north east of Austria. The station is one of the western endpoints of the Verkehrsverbund Ost-Region (East Region Transportation Authority).

== Train services ==
With only a few exceptions, all long-haul and regional trains run through St. Pölten railway station. Because of its location both on the existing Western Railway (Austria) and on its new high-speed line, the station is a stop on the Main line for Europe from Paris to Bratislava/Budapest.

The station is also the terminal for four regional transportation networks:

- The non-electrified Leobersdorfer Bahn, serving six stations in the Sankt Pölten urban area and several at smaller towns further south.
- The non-electrified Kamptalbahn, serving the route to Krems and to Horn.
- The electrified Tullnerfelder Bahn, serving stops within the city and to the north as far as Tulln an der Donau. A two-track expansion between Sankt Pölten and Herzogenburg is planned.
- The electrified narrow-gauge Mariazell Railway which runs south to the Catholic pilgrimage town Mariazell.

The station is served by the following services:

- Intercity-Express services (ICE 91) Hamburg - Hanover - Kassel - Nürnberg - Passau - Linz - St. Pölten - Vienna - Vienna Airport
- Intercity-Express services (ICE 91) Dortmund - Essen - Düsseldorf - Cologne - Koblenz - Frankfurt - Nürnberg - Passau - Linz - St. Pölten - Vienna - Vienna Airport
- RailJet services Zürich - Innsbruck - Salzburg - Linz - St. Pölten - Vienna - Győr - Budapest
- RailJet services Munich - Salzburg - Linz - St. Pölten - Vienna - Győr - Budapest

== History ==
Construction of the station began on 9 September 1856, five years after the "Empress Elisabeth West Railway" was launched. The construction of the station meant a considerable change to the urban character of the town. First, the Kremsertor (gate in the medieval wall) had to be dismantled, followed by the destruction of the entire city wall. A promenade was built in its place. Two years later, the first trains began to use the new stop. In 1877, the railway line between Leobersdorf, Kaumberg and Sankt Pölten became operational. Eight years later, lines to Krems an der Donau and Tulln an der Donau were added. With these new lines, the station building had become too small, so in 1877 a two-year construction project began to erect the current building. In 1907 the station became the terminal of the electric Mariazell Railway. In 1911 it was connected to the city's tram network, which operated until 1976. The station was rebuilt several times over the years, particularly after the city was bombed in April 1945. From 1965 to 1969, the western part of the station was renovated and the decorative corner pavilions made functional.

Between 2006 and 2010, the station underwent a €190-million renovation, resulting in a new pedestrian walkway and new platforms. A road tunnel was built on the western side of the complex and the forecourt was redesigned by the city of Sankt Pölten. The station building was also completely renovated; work that included a replacing the roof and façade and adding a better-lit central hall, an information kiosk and new shops. The renovated station was reopened on September 10, 2010.

The station after the renovations

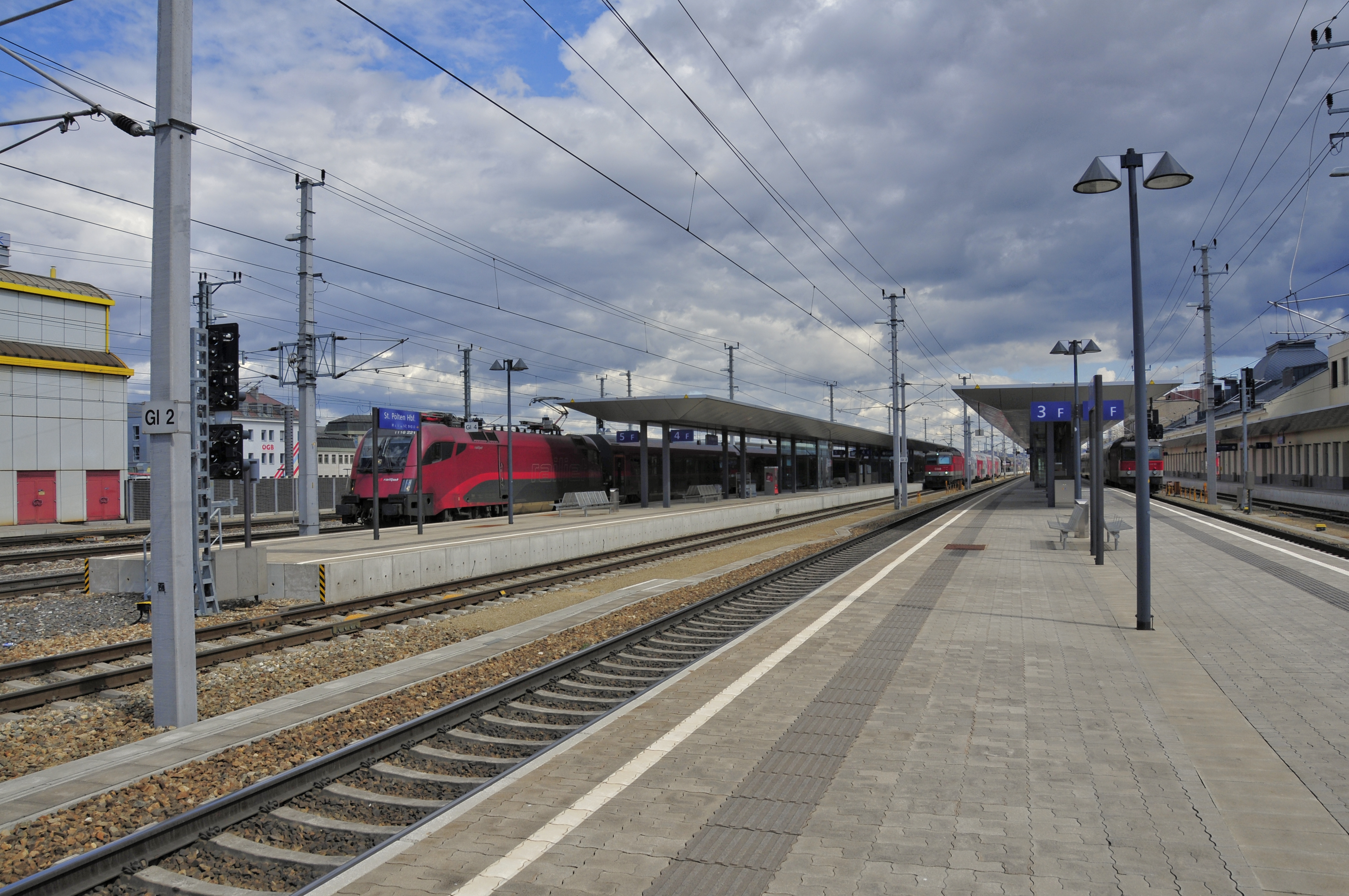
The new platform

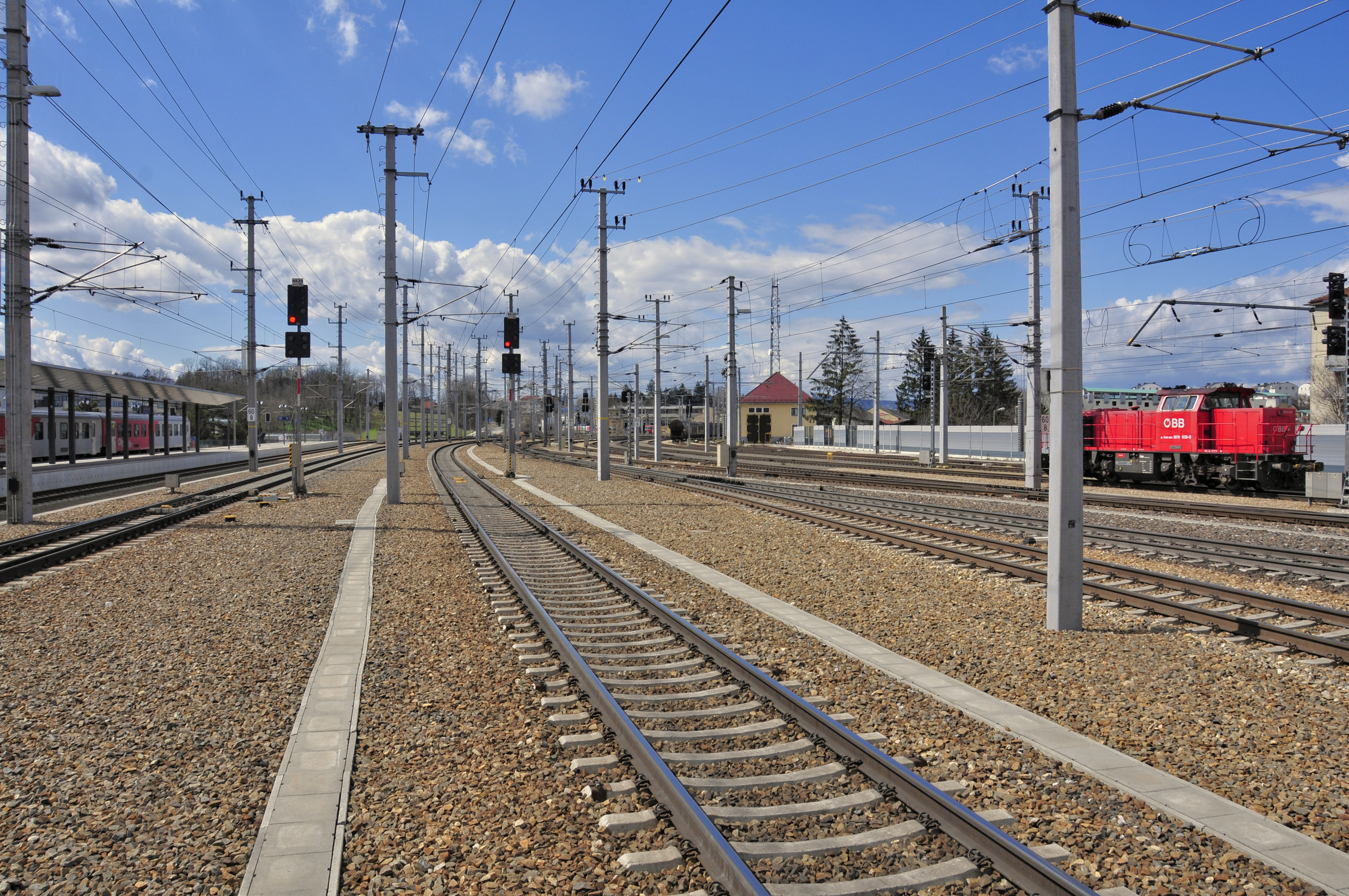
The new track systems

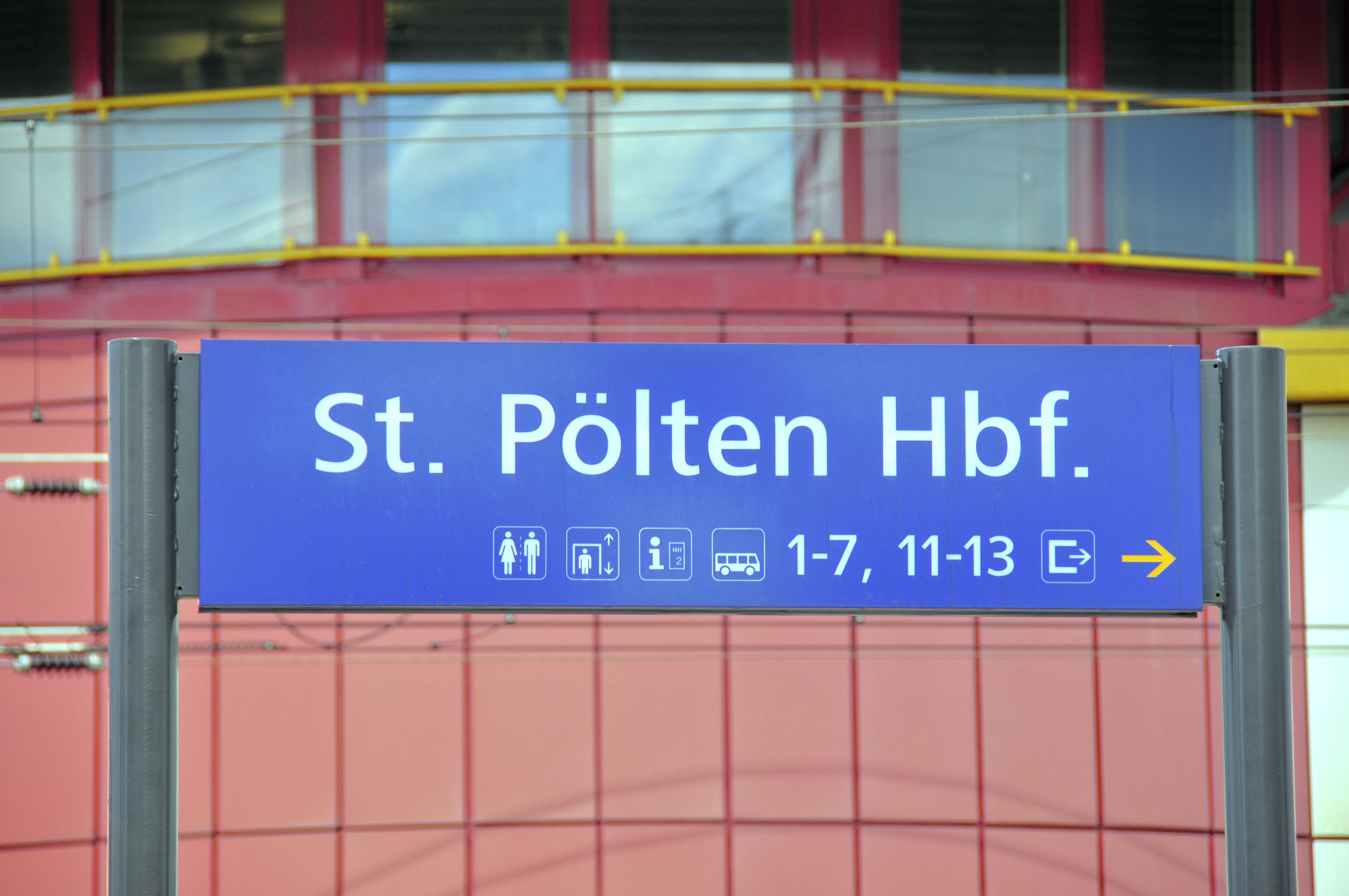
The new signs

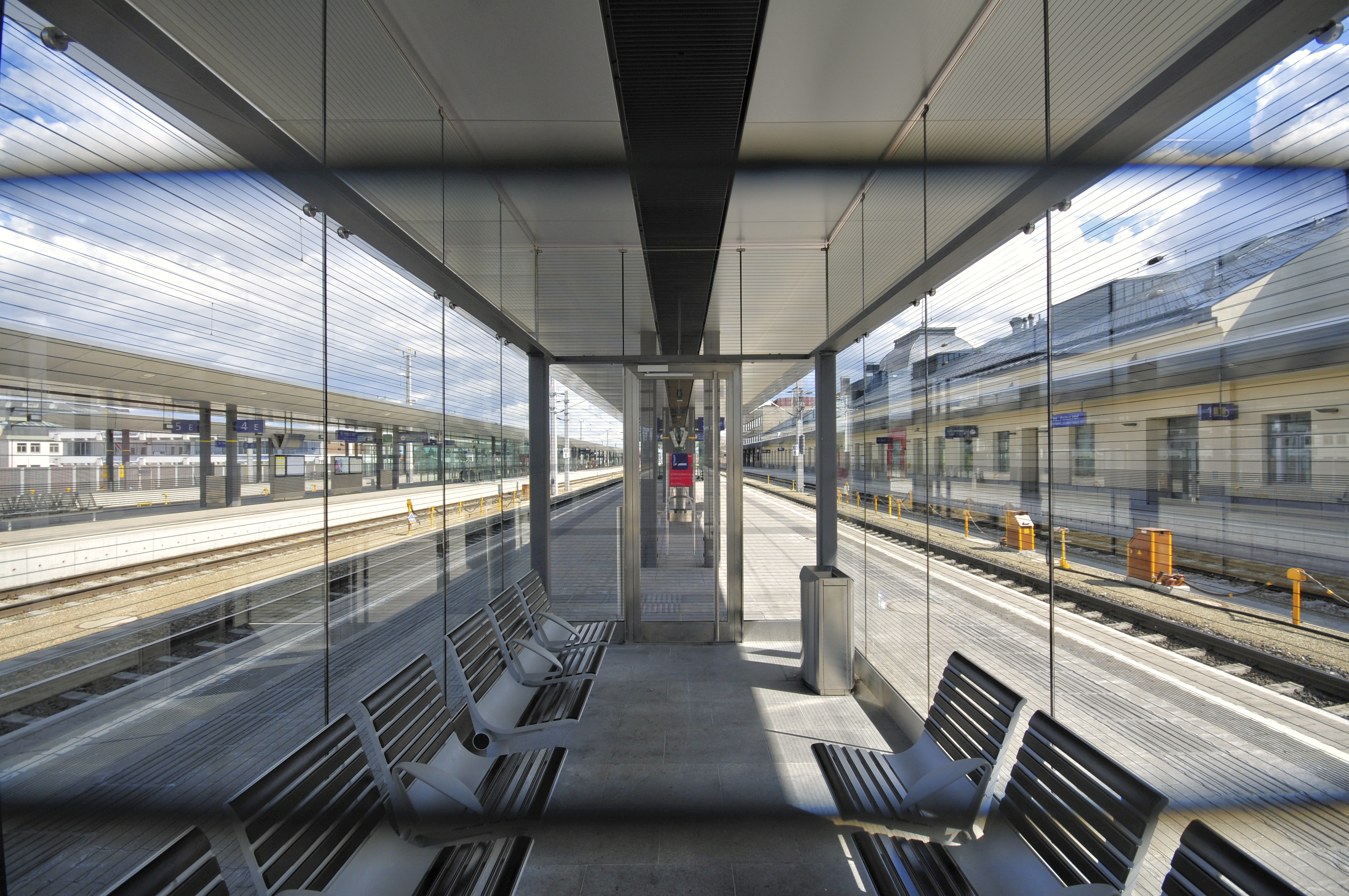
The new waiting areas

== See also ==
- Rail transport in Austria
