= Mödling railway station =

Railway station in Lower Austria

Mödling
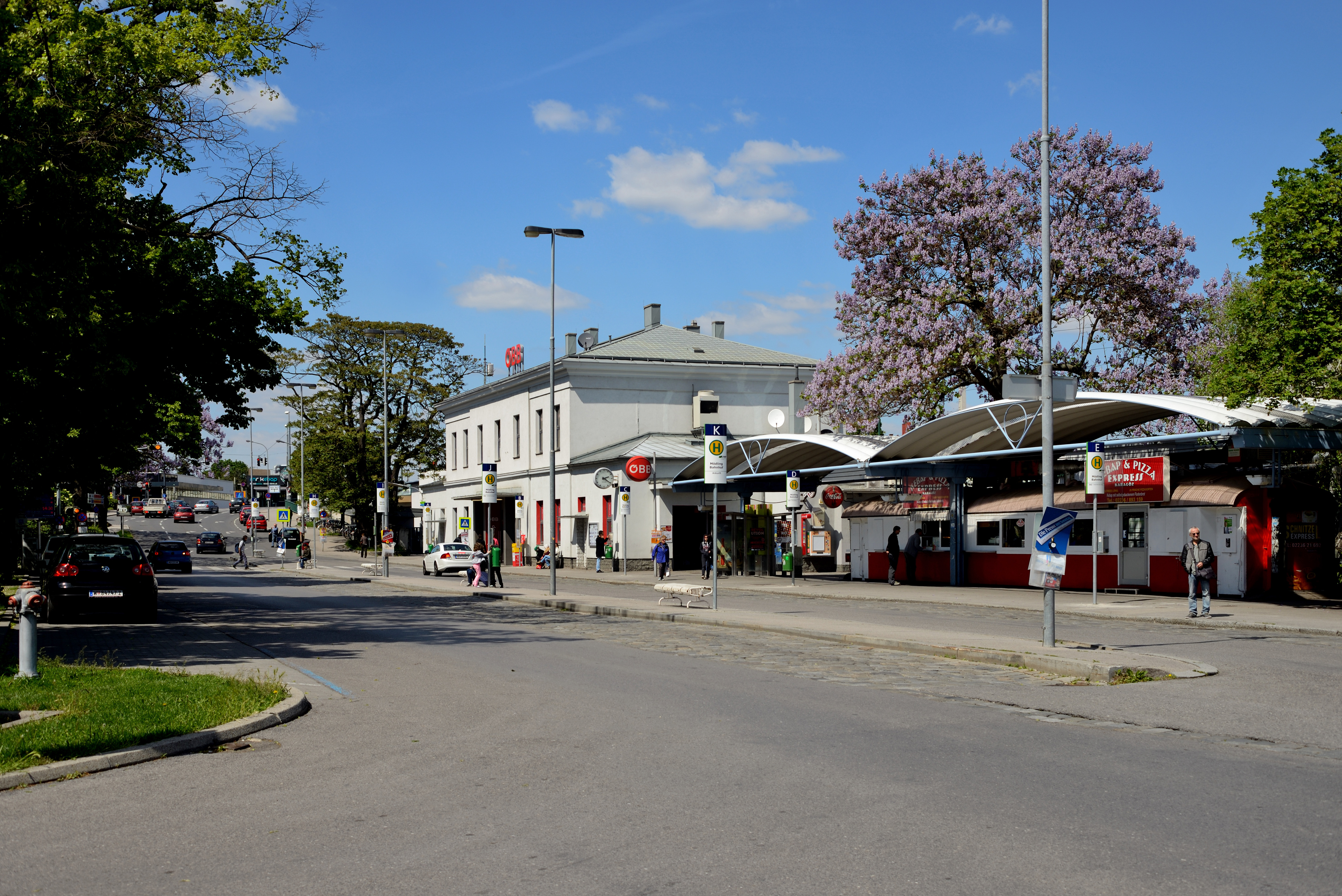
- station forecourt with bus stops in 2014

General information
- Location: Bahnhofplatz 10; 2340 Mödling; Austria
- Coordinates: 48°05′08.1″N 16°17′43.4″E
- Owner: ÖBB
- Operator: ÖBB
- Line: Southern Railway
- Platforms: 4

Other information
- Station code: Md

History
- Opened: 29 May 1841; 185 years ago
- Former names: Mödling and Hinterbrühl Tram; Laxenburg Railway

Services
Preceding station	Vienna S-Bahn	Following station
Terminus	S2	Brunn-Maria Enzersdorf towards Laa an der Thaya
Guntramsdorf-Thallern towards Wiener Neustadt Hbf	S3	Brunn-Maria Enzersdorf towards Hollabrunn
Guntramsdorf-Thallern towards Wiener Neustadt Hbf	S4	Brunn-Maria Enzersdorf towards Absdorf-Hippersdorf
Location
- Location within Austria

Mödling is a train station in Mödling, Austria. It is served by Vienna S-Bahn lines S1 and S2 and regional trains.
