= Eichgraben-Altlengbach railway station =

Railway station in Lower Austria

Eichgraben-Altlengbach
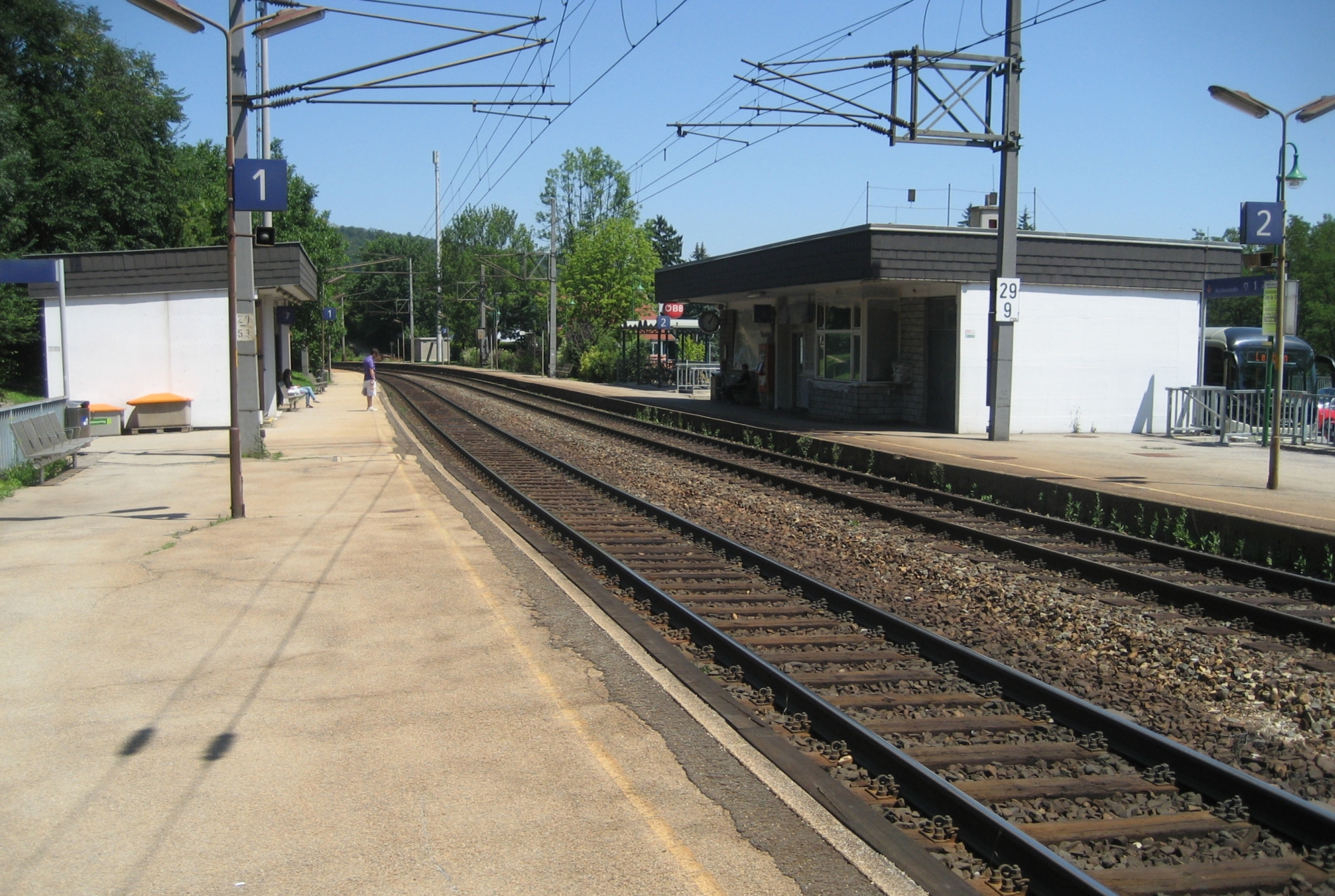

General information
- Location: Bahnhofplatz 1; 3032 Eichgraben; Austria
- Coordinates: 48°10′24.1″N 15°58′52.8″E
- Owner: ÖBB
- Operator: ÖBB
- Platforms: 2 side
- Tracks: 2

Services
Preceding station	Vienna S-Bahn	Following station
Unter Oberndorf towards Neulengbach	S50	Rekawinkel towards Wien Westbahnhof
Location
- Location within Austria

Eichgraben-Altlengbach is a railway station serving Eichgraben in Lower Austria.
