= Unter Purkersdorf railway station =

Railway station in Lower Austria

Unter Purkersdorf
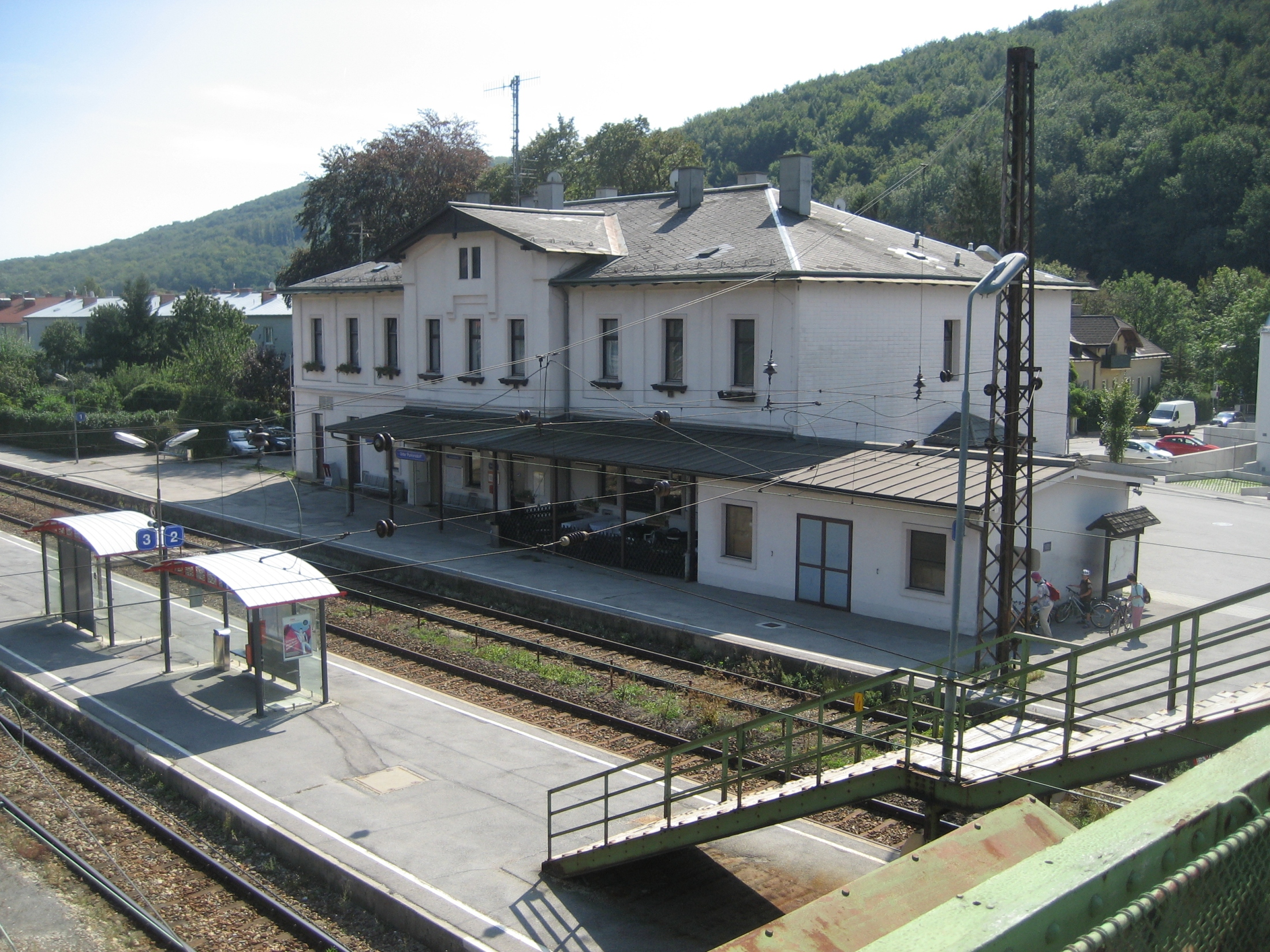

General information
- Location: Bahnhofstraße 7; 3002 Purkersdorf; Austria
- Coordinates: 48°12′27″N 16°11′20″E
- Owner: ÖBB
- Operator: ÖBB
- Platforms: 3 side 1 island
- Tracks: 7

Services
Preceding station	Vienna S-Bahn	Following station
Purkersdorf Zentrum towards Neulengbach	S50	Purkersdorf Sanatorium towards Wien Westbahnhof
Location
- Location within Austria Location within Europe

Unter Purkersdorf is a railway station serving Purkersdorf in Lower Austria. In 2019, commuters were bothered about the absence of information and shortage of rail replacement service after 'technical ailments in Hütteldorf'. ÖBB attempted to settle the issue promptly.
