= Purkersdorf Sanatorium railway station =

Railway station in Lower Austria

Purkersdorf Sanatorium
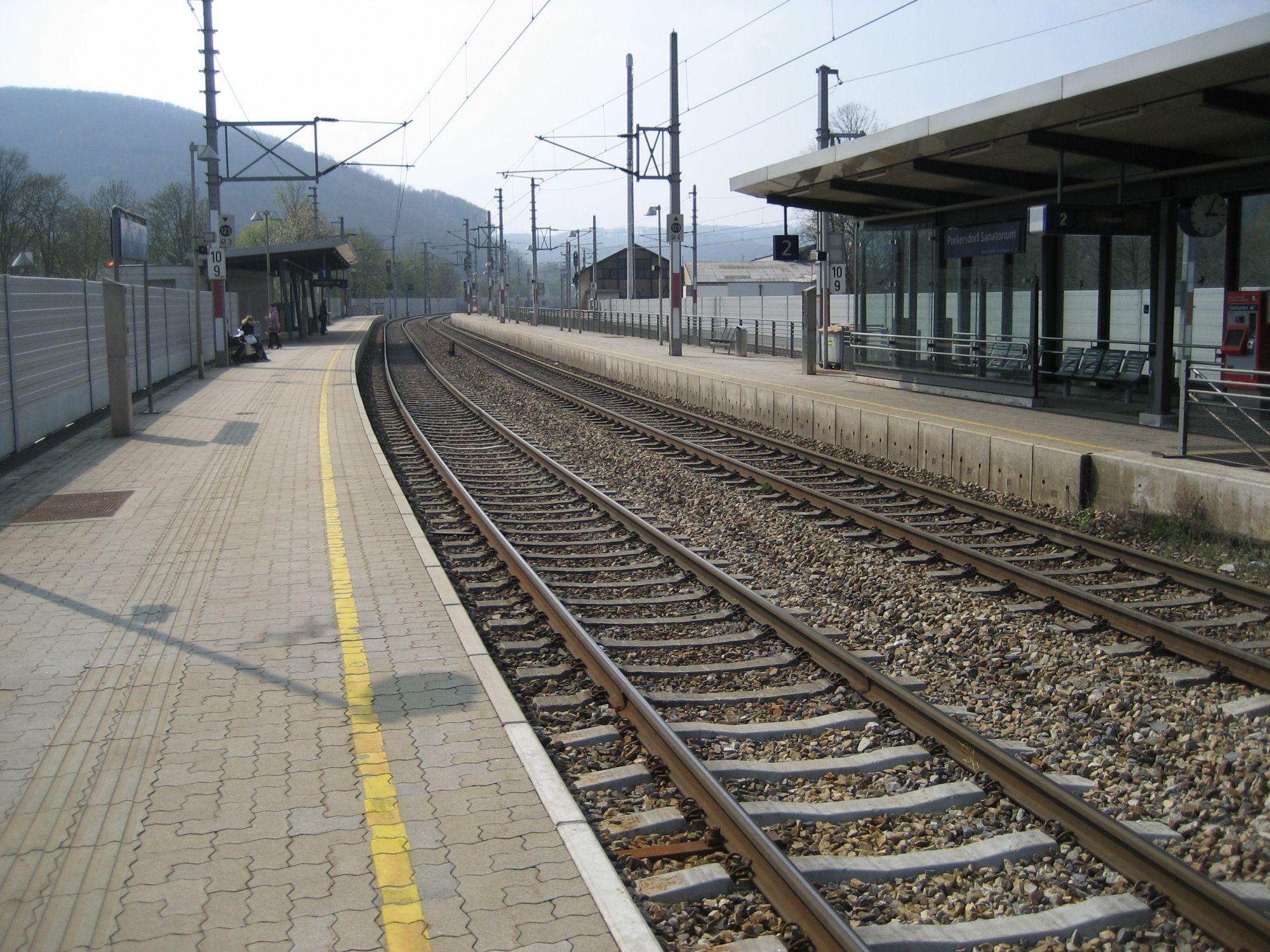

General information
- Location: 3002 Purkersdorf; Austria
- Coordinates: 48°12′23″N 16°12′03″E
- Owner: ÖBB
- Operator: ÖBB
- Platforms: 2 side
- Tracks: 4

Services
Preceding station	Vienna S-Bahn	Following station
Unter Purkersdorf towards Neulengbach	S50	Wien Weidlingau towards Wien Westbahnhof
Location
- Location within Austria

Purkersdorf Sanatorium is a railway station serving Purkersdorf in Lower Austria.
