= Unter Tullnerbach railway station =

Railway station in Lower Austria

Unter Tullnerbach
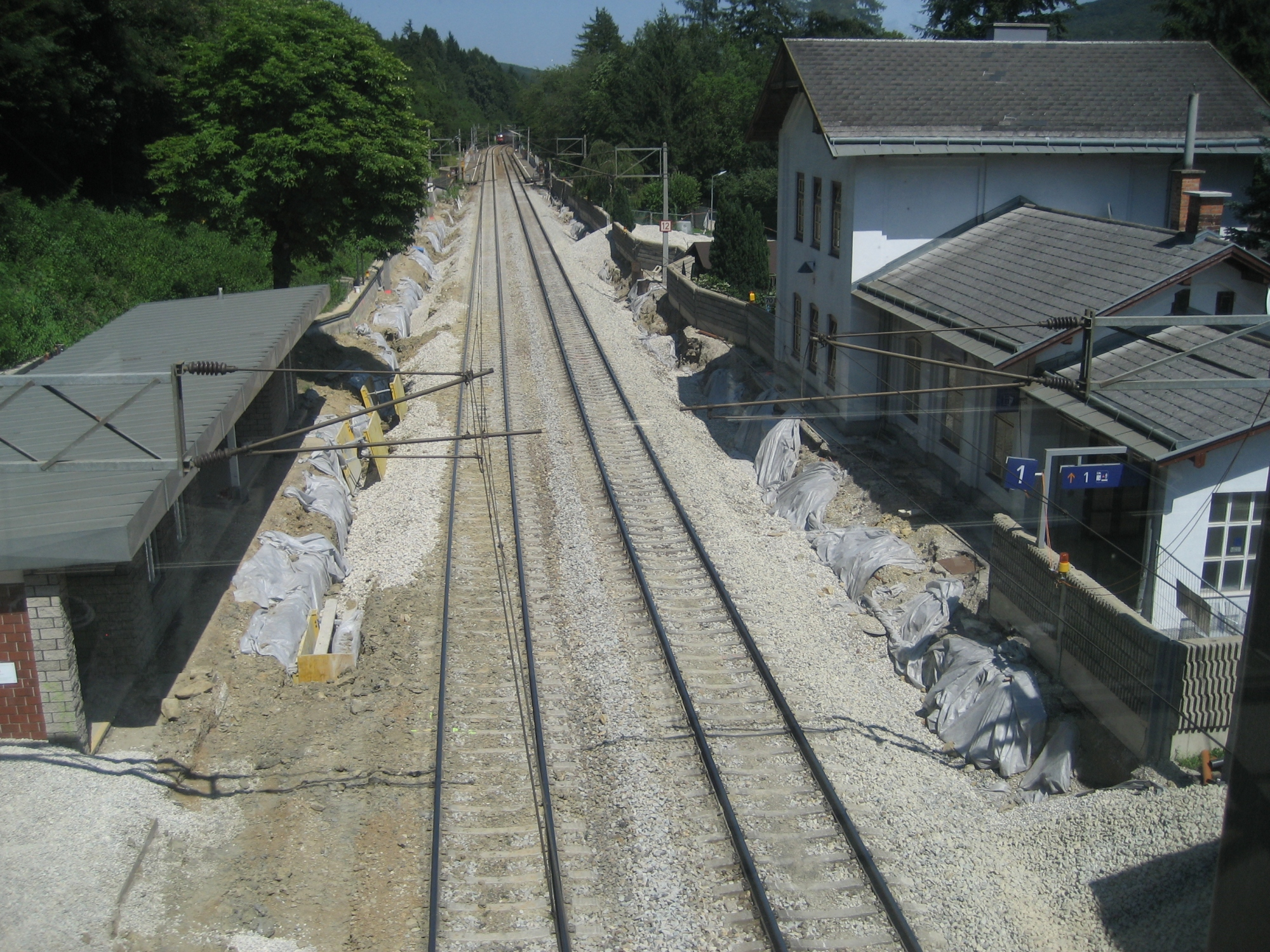

General information
- Location: Am Bahnweg 14; 3011 Purkersdorf; Austria
- Coordinates: 48°11′29.8″N 16°7′40.8″E
- Owner: ÖBB
- Operator: ÖBB
- Platforms: 2 side
- Tracks: 2

Services
Preceding station	Vienna S-Bahn	Following station
Tullnerbach-Pressbaum towards Neulengbach	S50	Purkersdorf Zentrum towards Wien Westbahnhof
Location
- Location within Austria

Unter Tullnerbach is a railway station serving Purkersdorf in Lower Austria.
