= Maria Anzbach railway station =

Railway station in Lower Austria

Maria Anzbach
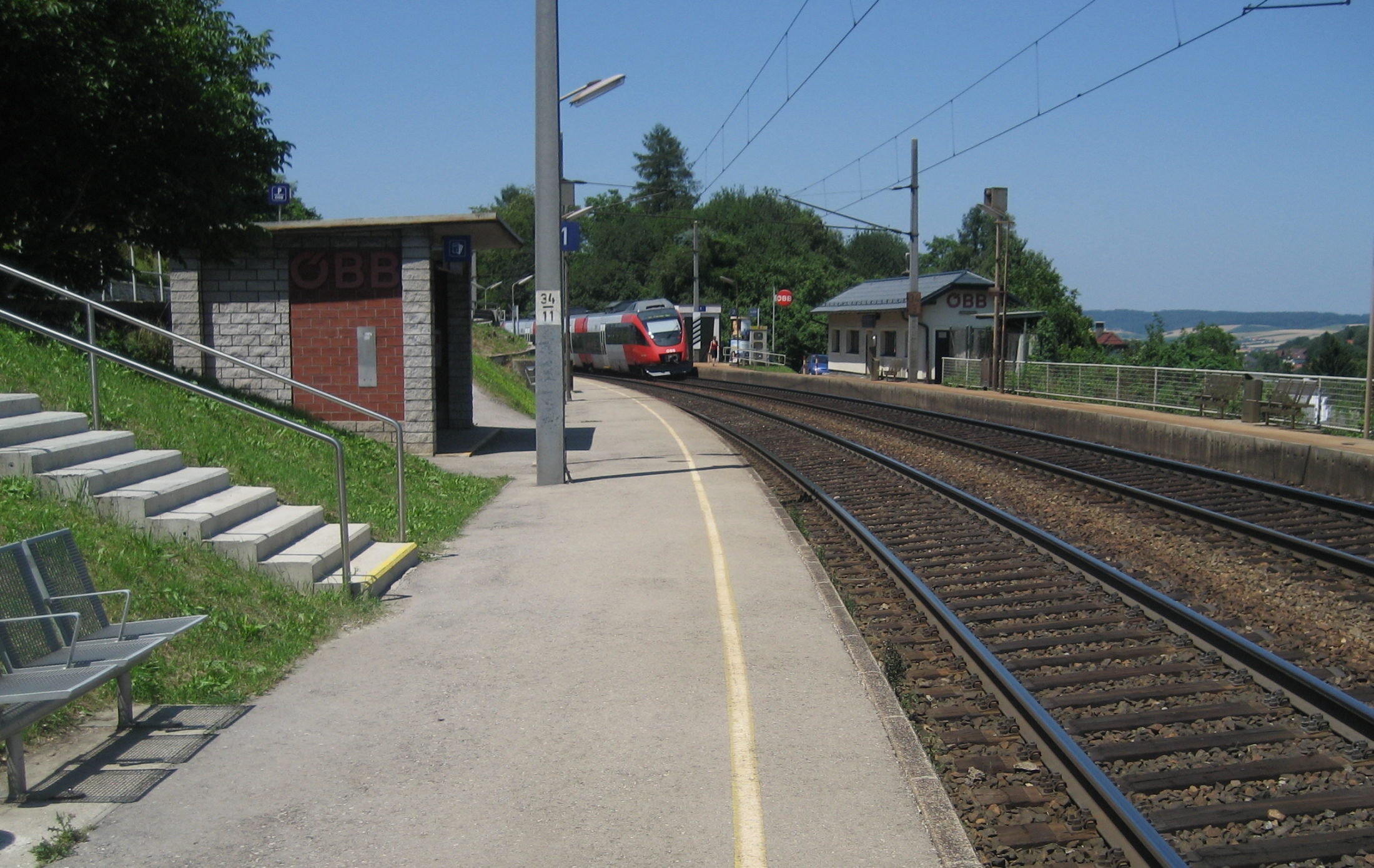

General information
- Location: Bahnhofplatz 1; 3034 Maria Anzbach; Austria
- Coordinates: 48°11′17.1″N 15°56′2.7″E
- Owner: ÖBB
- Operator: ÖBB
- Platforms: 2 side
- Tracks: 2

Services
Preceding station	Vienna S-Bahn	Following station
Hofstatt towards Neulengbach	S50	Unter Oberndorf towards Wien Westbahnhof
Location
- Location within Austria

Maria Anzbach is a railway station serving Maria Anzbach in Lower Austria.
