= Wien Weidlingau railway station =

Railway station in Vienna, Austria

Wien Weidlingau
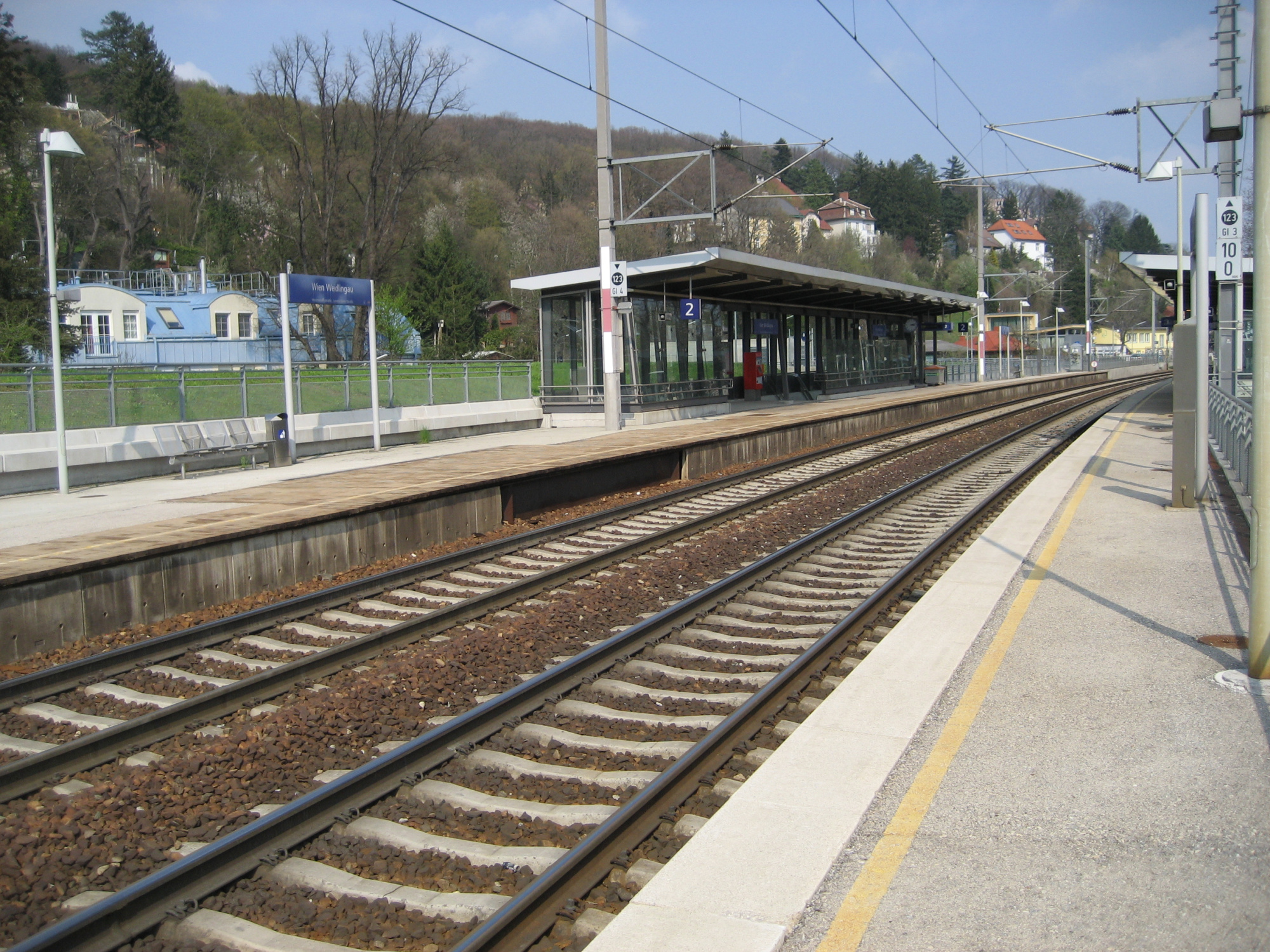

General information
- Location: 1140 Vienna; Austria
- Coordinates: 48°12′38″N 16°12′43″E
- Owner: ÖBB
- Operator: ÖBB
- Platforms: 2 side
- Tracks: 2

Services
Preceding station	Vienna S-Bahn	Following station
Purkersdorf Sanatorium towards Neulengbach	S50	Wien Hadersdorf towards Wien Westbahnhof
Location
- Location within Vienna

Wien Weidlingau is a railway station serving Penzing, the fourteenth district of Vienna.
