= Pressbaum railway station =

Railway station in Lower Austria

Pressbaum
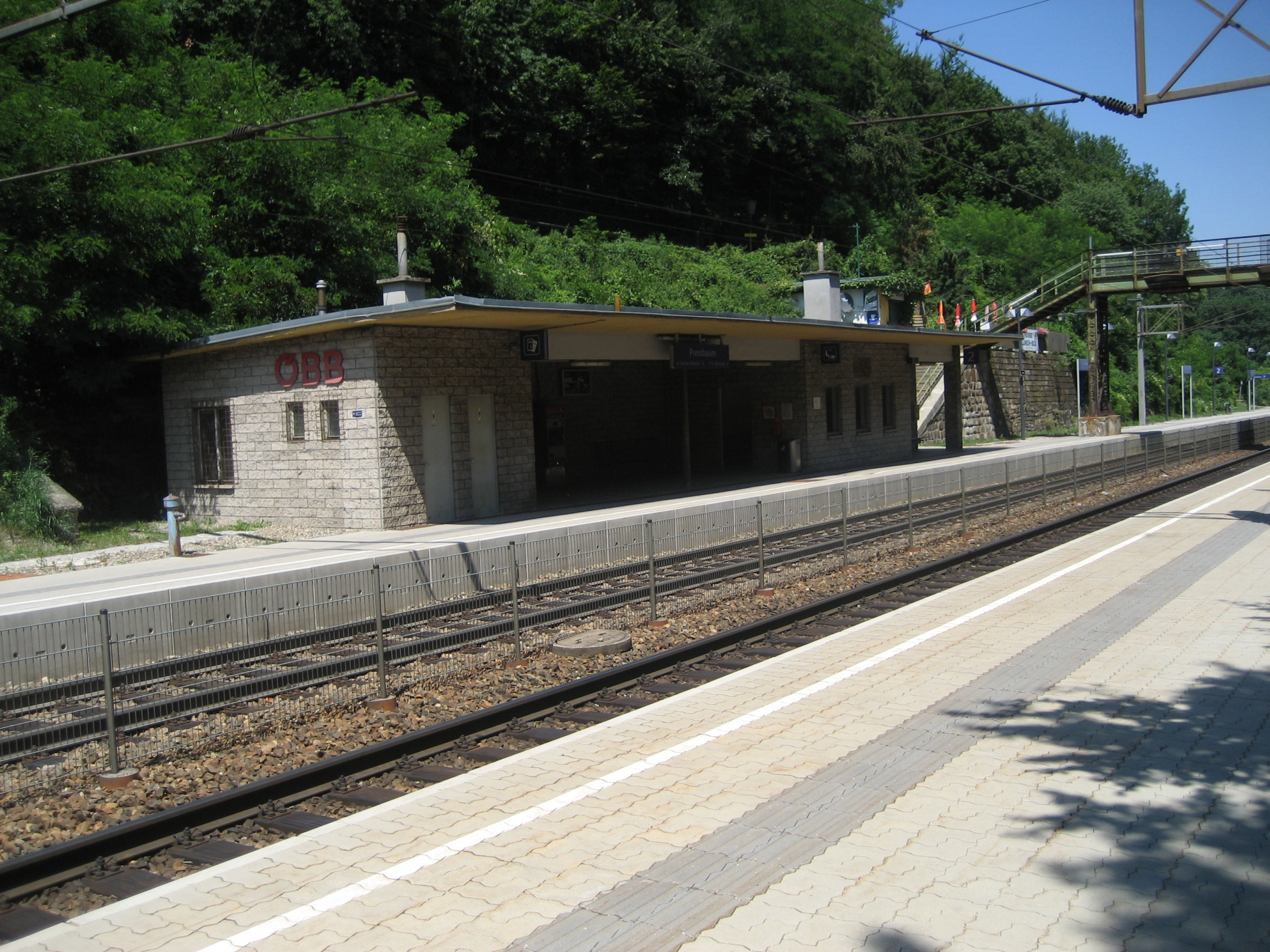

General information
- Location: Bahnweg; 3021 Pressbaum; Austria
- Coordinates: 48°10′52.7″N 16°4′39.8″E
- Owner: ÖBB
- Operator: ÖBB
- Platforms: 2 side
- Tracks: 2

Services
Preceding station	Vienna S-Bahn	Following station
Dürrwien towards Neulengbach	S50	Tullnerbach-Pressbaum towards Wien Westbahnhof
Location
- Location within Austria

Pressbaum is a railway station serving Pressbaum in Lower Austria.
