= Purkersdorf Zentrum railway station =

Railway station in Lower Austria

Purkersdorf Zentrum
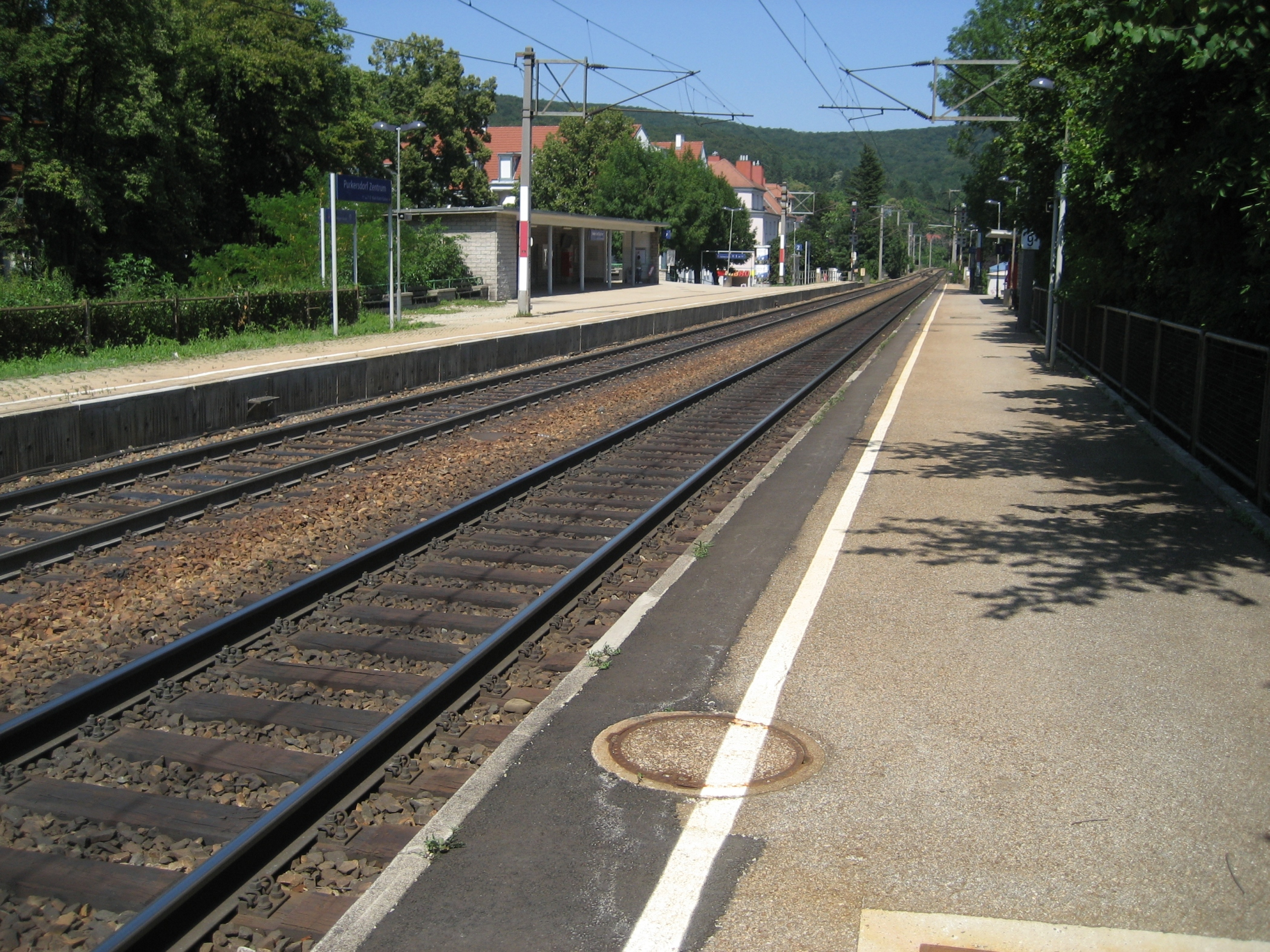

General information
- Location: Bahnhofplatz 1; 3002 Purkersdorf; Austria
- Coordinates: 48°12′21.6″N 16°10′31.8″E
- Owner: ÖBB
- Operator: ÖBB
- Platforms: 2 side
- Tracks: 2

Services
Preceding station	Vienna S-Bahn	Following station
Unter Tullnerbach towards Neulengbach	S50	Unter Purkersdorf towards Wien Westbahnhof
Location
- Location within Austria

Purkersdorf Zentrum is a railway station serving Purkersdorf in Lower Austria.
