= Hofstatt railway station =

Railway station in Lower Austria

Hofstatt
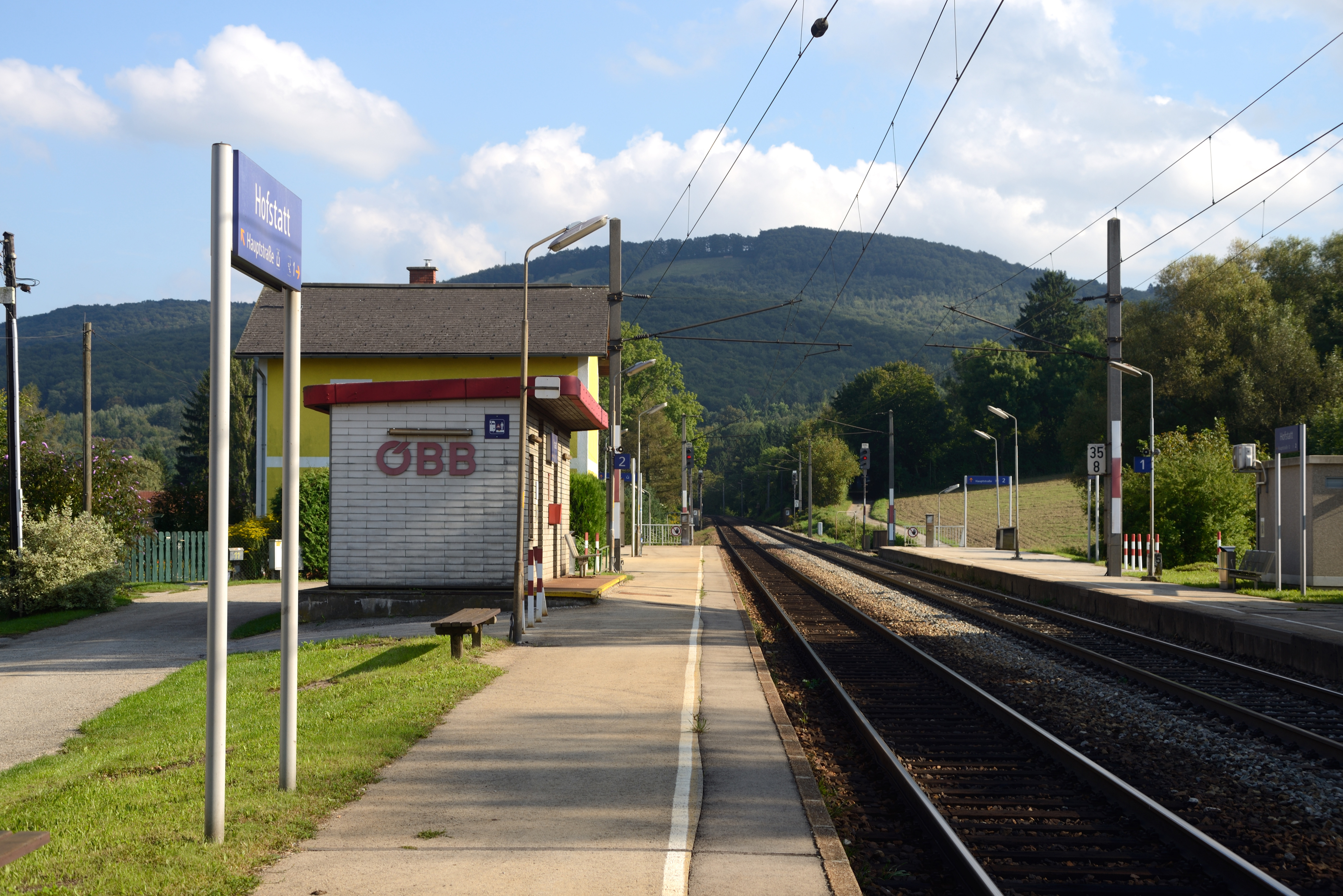

General information
- Location: 3034 Hofstatt; Austria
- Coordinates: 48°11′30.9″N 15°55′6.3″E
- Owner: ÖBB
- Operator: ÖBB
- Platforms: 2 side
- Tracks: 2

Services
Preceding station	Vienna S-Bahn	Following station
Neulengbach Stadt towards Neulengbach	S50	Maria Anzbach towards Wien Westbahnhof
Location
- Location within Austria

Hofstatt is a railway station serving Hofstatt in Lower Austria.
