= Wien Wolf in der Au railway station =

Railway station in Vienna, Austria

Wien Wolf in der Au
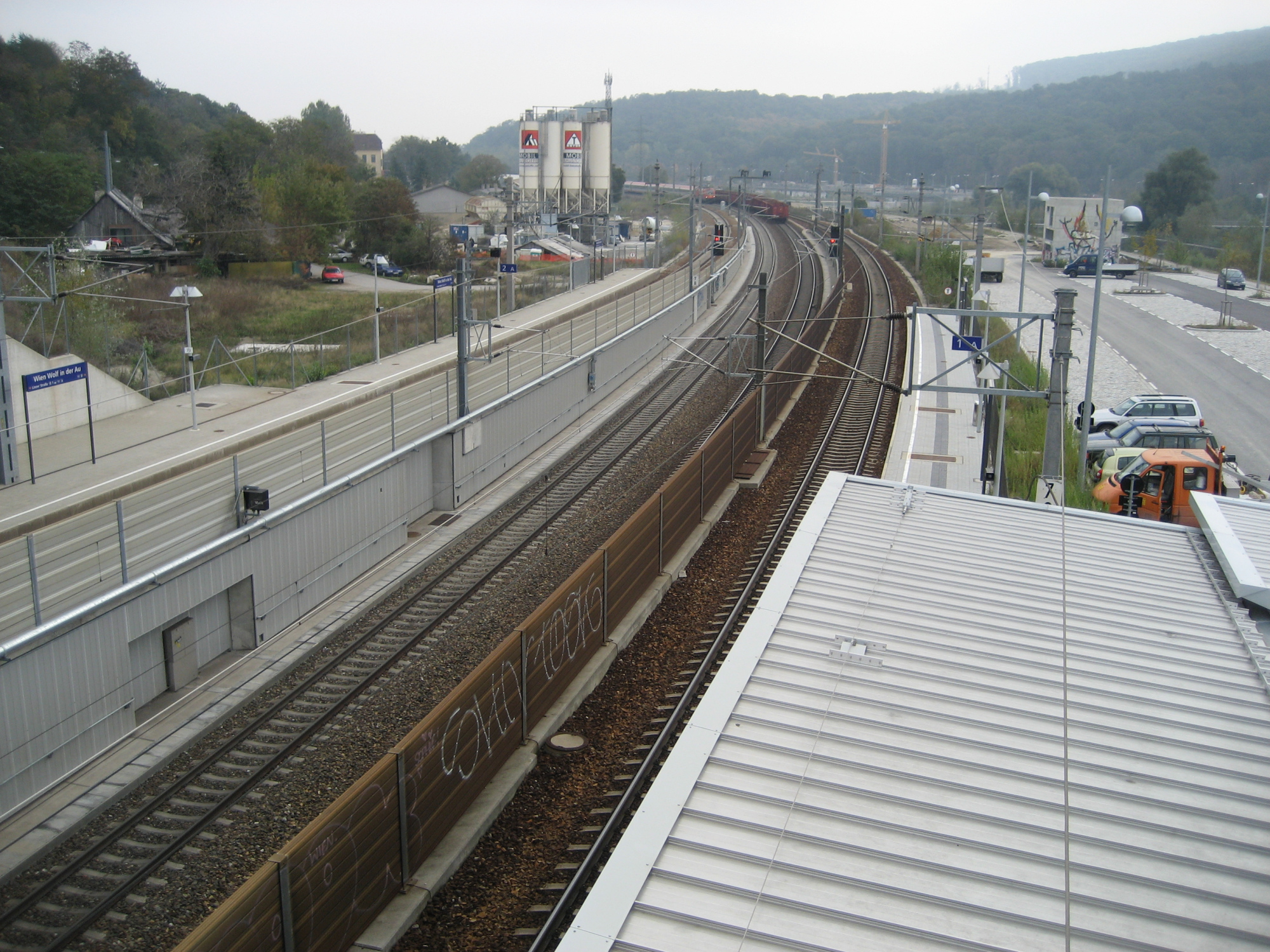

General information
- Location: Hadersdorfer Hauptstraße 16; 1140 Vienna; Austria
- Coordinates: 48°12′17″N 16°14′11″E
- Owner: ÖBB
- Operator: ÖBB
- Platforms: 2 side
- Tracks: 4

Services
Preceding station	Vienna S-Bahn	Following station
Wien Hadersdorf towards Neulengbach	S50	Wien Hütteldorf towards Wien Westbahnhof
Location
- Location within Vienna

Wien Wolf in der Au is a railway station serving Penzing, the fourteenth district of Vienna.

== See also ==
- Rail transport in Austria
