= Wien Hadersdorf railway station =

Railway station in Vienna, Austria

Wien Hadersdorf
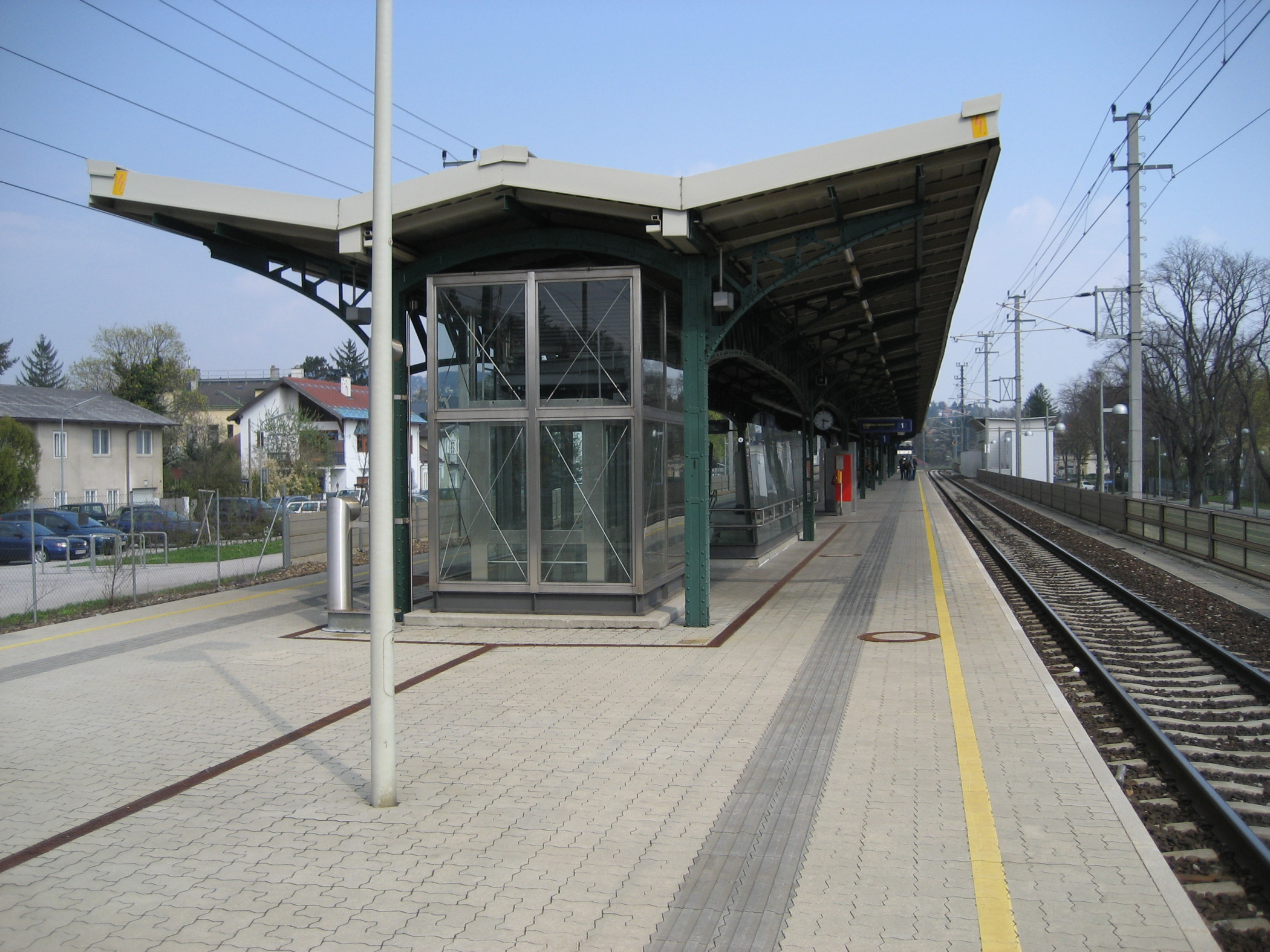

General information
- Location: 1140 Vienna; Austria
- Coordinates: 48°12′37″N 16°13′24″E
- Owner: ÖBB
- Operator: ÖBB
- Platforms: 1 island
- Tracks: 2

Services
Preceding station	Vienna S-Bahn	Following station
Wien Weidlingau towards Neulengbach	S50	Wien Wolf in der Au towards Wien Westbahnhof
Location
- Location within Vienna

Wien Hadersdorf is a railway station serving Penzing, the fourteenth district of Vienna.

== See also ==
- Rail transport in Austria
