= Dürrwien railway station =

Railway station in Lower Austria

Dürrwien
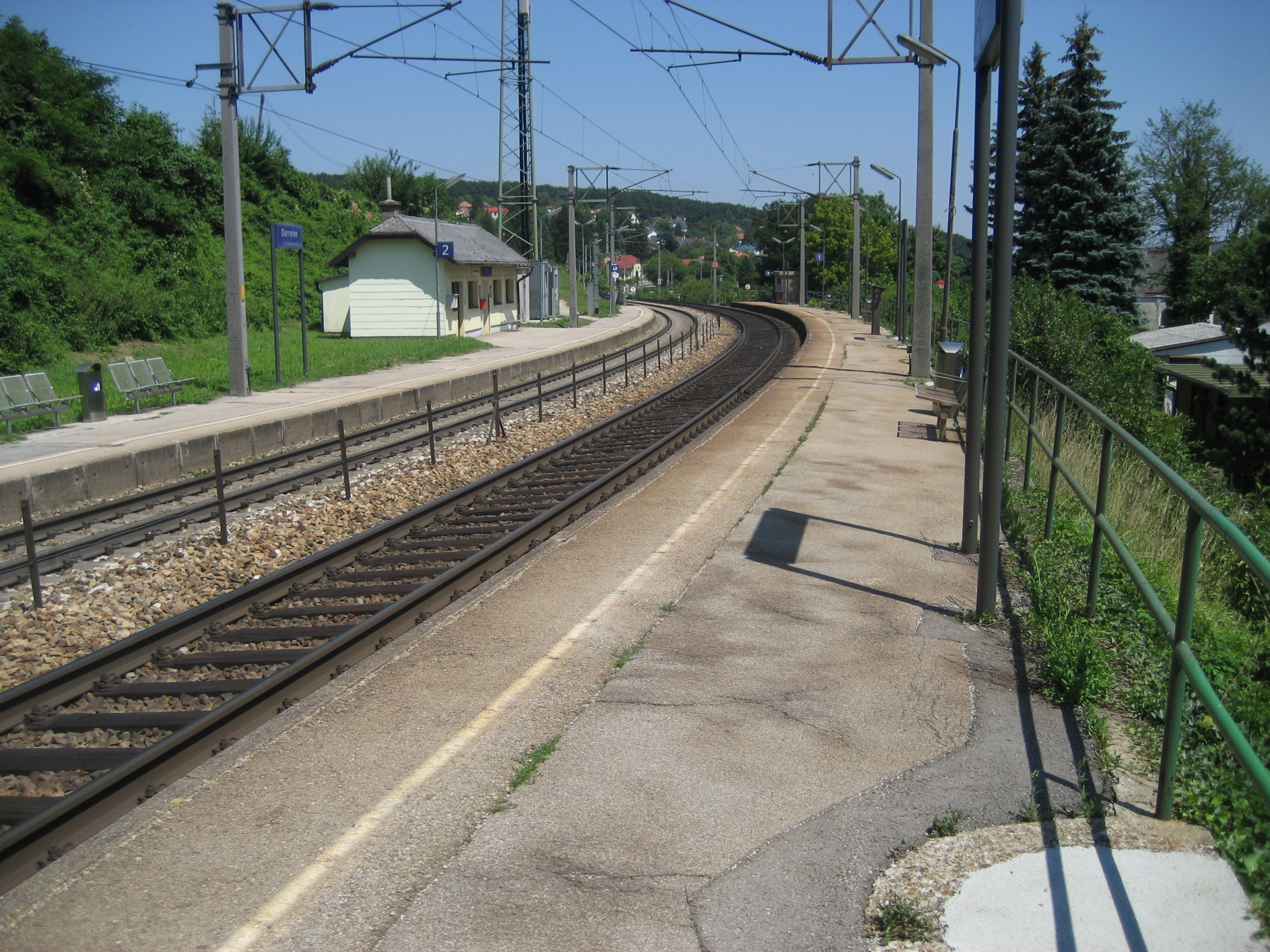

General information
- Location: Bahnhofplatz 1; 3021 Pressbaum; Austria
- Coordinates: 48°10′42.5″N 16°3′42.8″E
- Owner: ÖBB
- Operator: ÖBB
- Platforms: 2 side
- Tracks: 2

Services
Preceding station	Vienna S-Bahn	Following station
Rekawinkel towards Neulengbach	S50	Pressbaum towards Wien Westbahnhof
Location
- Location within Austria

Dürrwien is a railway station serving Pressbaum in Lower Austria.
