= Rekawinkel railway station =

Railway station in Lower Austria

Rekawinkel
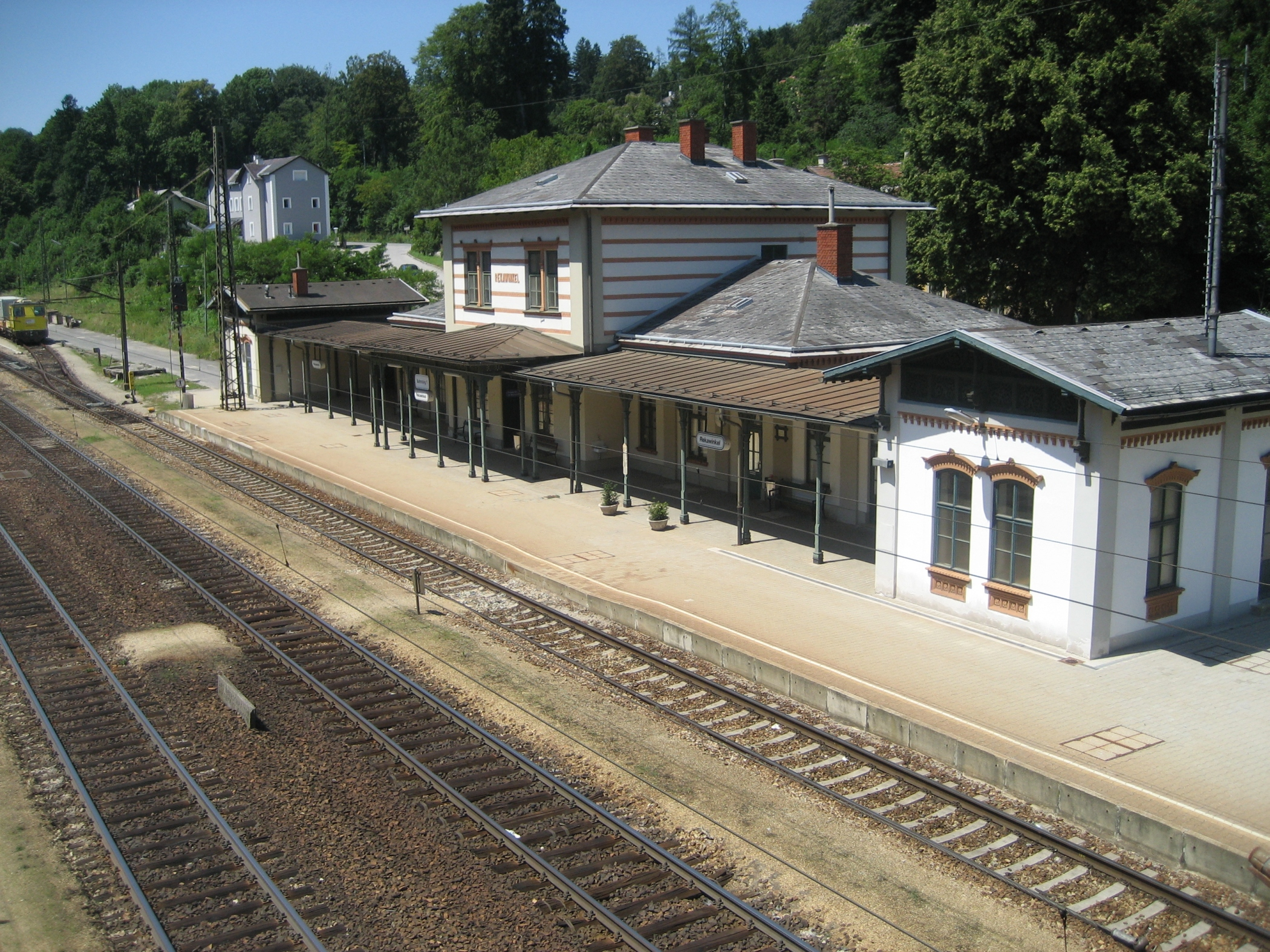

General information
- Location: Linke Bahngasse; 3031 Rekawinkel; Austria
- Coordinates: 48°10′47.3″N 16°1′54.0″E
- Owner: ÖBB
- Operator: ÖBB
- Platforms: 2 side
- Tracks: 4

Services
Preceding station	Vienna S-Bahn	Following station
Eichgraben-Altlengbach towards Neulengbach	S50	Dürrwien towards Wien Westbahnhof
Location
- Location within Austria

Rekawinkel is a railway station serving Rekawinkel in Lower Austria.
