= Tullnerbach-Pressbaum railway station =

Railway station in Lower Austria

Tullnerbach Pressbaum
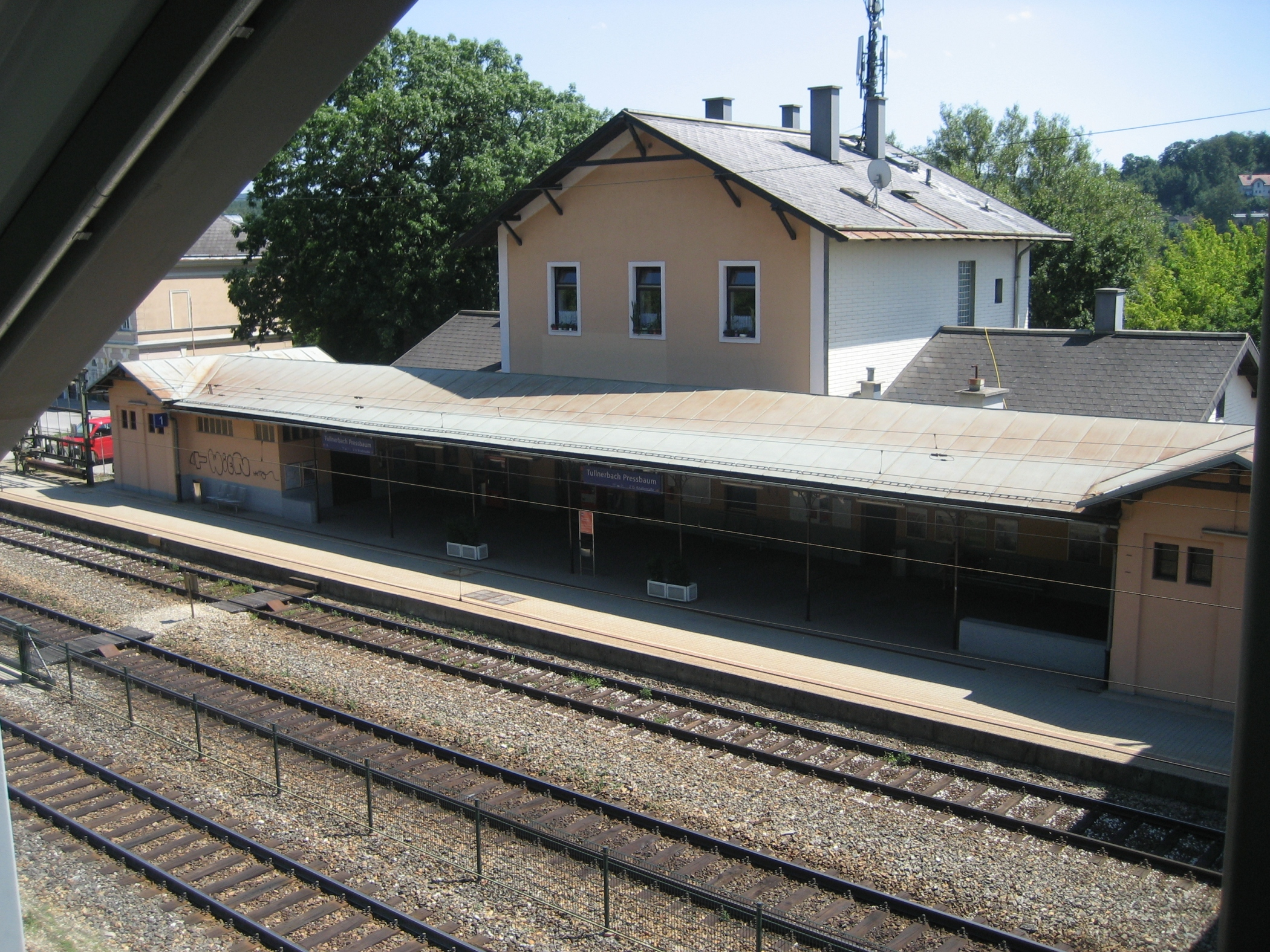

General information
- Location: Knabstraße 4; 3013 Tullnerbach; Austria
- Coordinates: 48°11′10″N 16°5′35.8″E
- Owner: ÖBB
- Operator: ÖBB
- Platforms: 2 side
- Tracks: 4

Services
Preceding station	Vienna S-Bahn	Following station
Pressbaum towards Neulengbach	S50	Unter Tullnerbach towards Wien Westbahnhof
Location
- Location within Austria

Tullnerbach-Pressbaum is a railway station serving Tullnerbach in Lower Austria.
