= Neulengbach Stadt railway station =

Railway station in Lower Austria

Neuleungbach Stadt
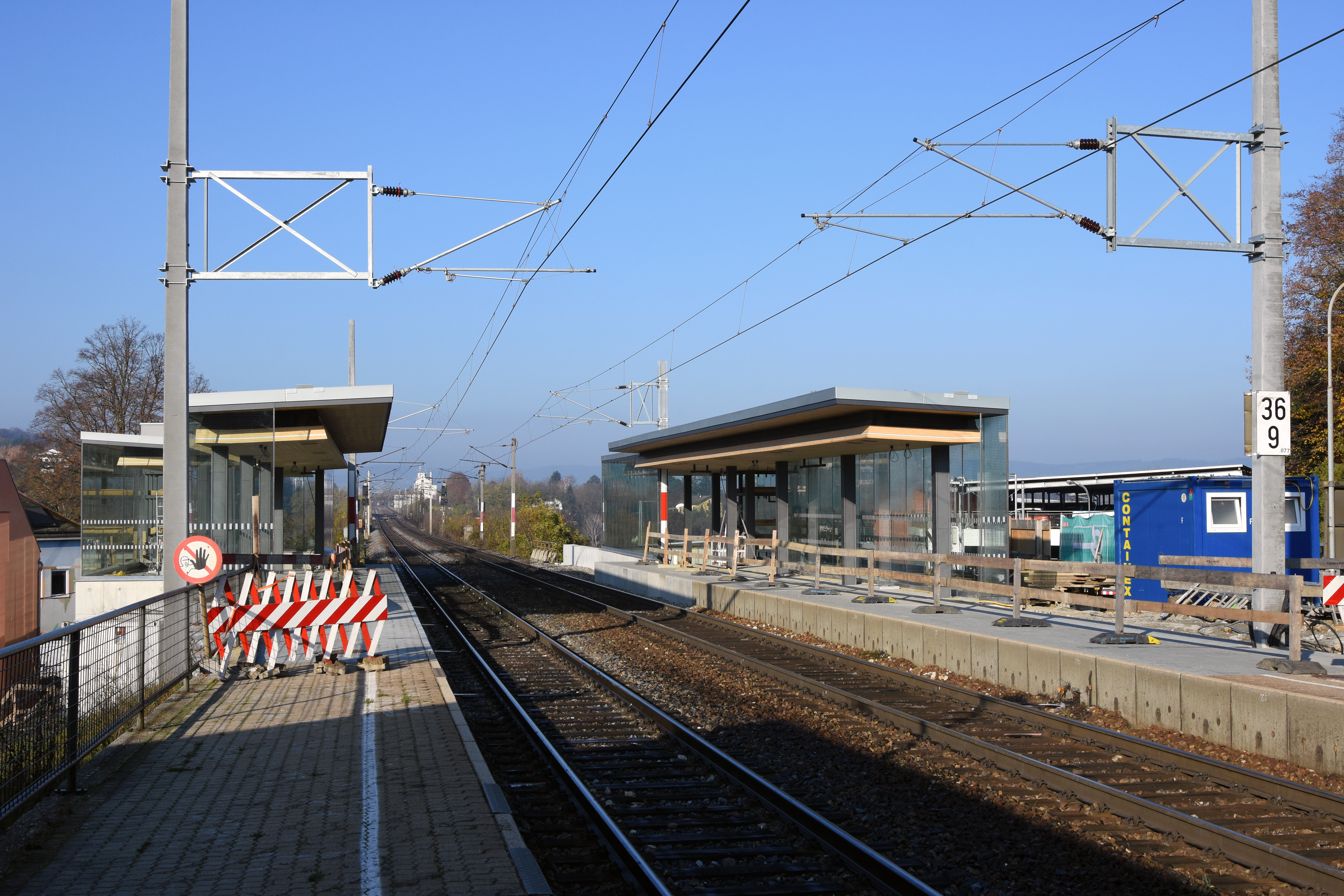

General information
- Location: Neulengbacher Straße 78-80; 3040 Neulengbach; Austria
- Coordinates: 48°11′46.7″N 15°54′22.9″E
- Owner: ÖBB
- Operator: ÖBB
- Platforms: 2 side
- Tracks: 2

Services
Preceding station	Vienna S-Bahn	Following station
Neulengbach Terminus	S50	Hofstatt towards Wien Westbahnhof
Location
- Location within Austria

Neulengbach Stadt is a railway station serving Neulengbach in Lower Austria.
