= Sandstein-Wienerwald natural park =

Natural park in Austria

Coordinates: 48.1986°N 16.1818°E

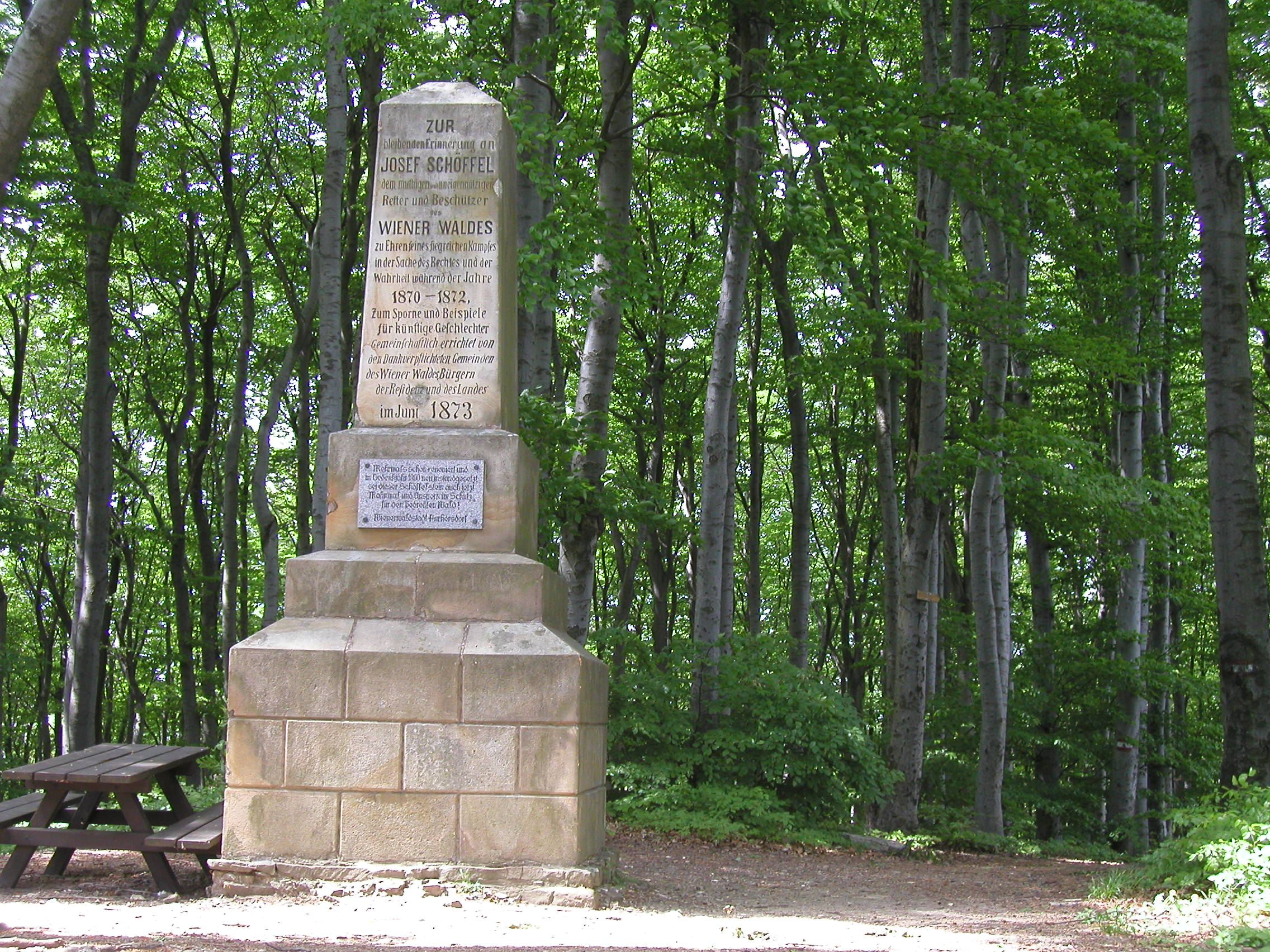
Josef Schöffel memorial in the Sandstein-Wienerwald natural park.

The Sandstein-Wienerwald natural park (Naturpark Sandsteinwienerwald) is a natural park near Purkersdorf in the Vienna Woods (Wienerwald), Austria. Although a protected area under Austrian law, it is freely accessible.

The park's 77 hectare area is mostly covered by beech forest. Its highest point is the Rudolfshöhe (475 m), on whose top a lookout tower has been constructed. Another hill, the Schöffelstein (431 m) features a memorial to Josef Schöffel, who is remembered as the "saviour of the Vienna Woods" on account of his 1872 campaign to protect the woods from logging.

Visitors' amenities in the park include a nature trail and a visitors' centre featuring expositions on topics of local interest. The park also includes an enclosure in which with deer and boars are kept, as well as a petting zoo.
