= Unter Oberndorf railway station =

Railway station in Lower Austria

Unter Oberndorf
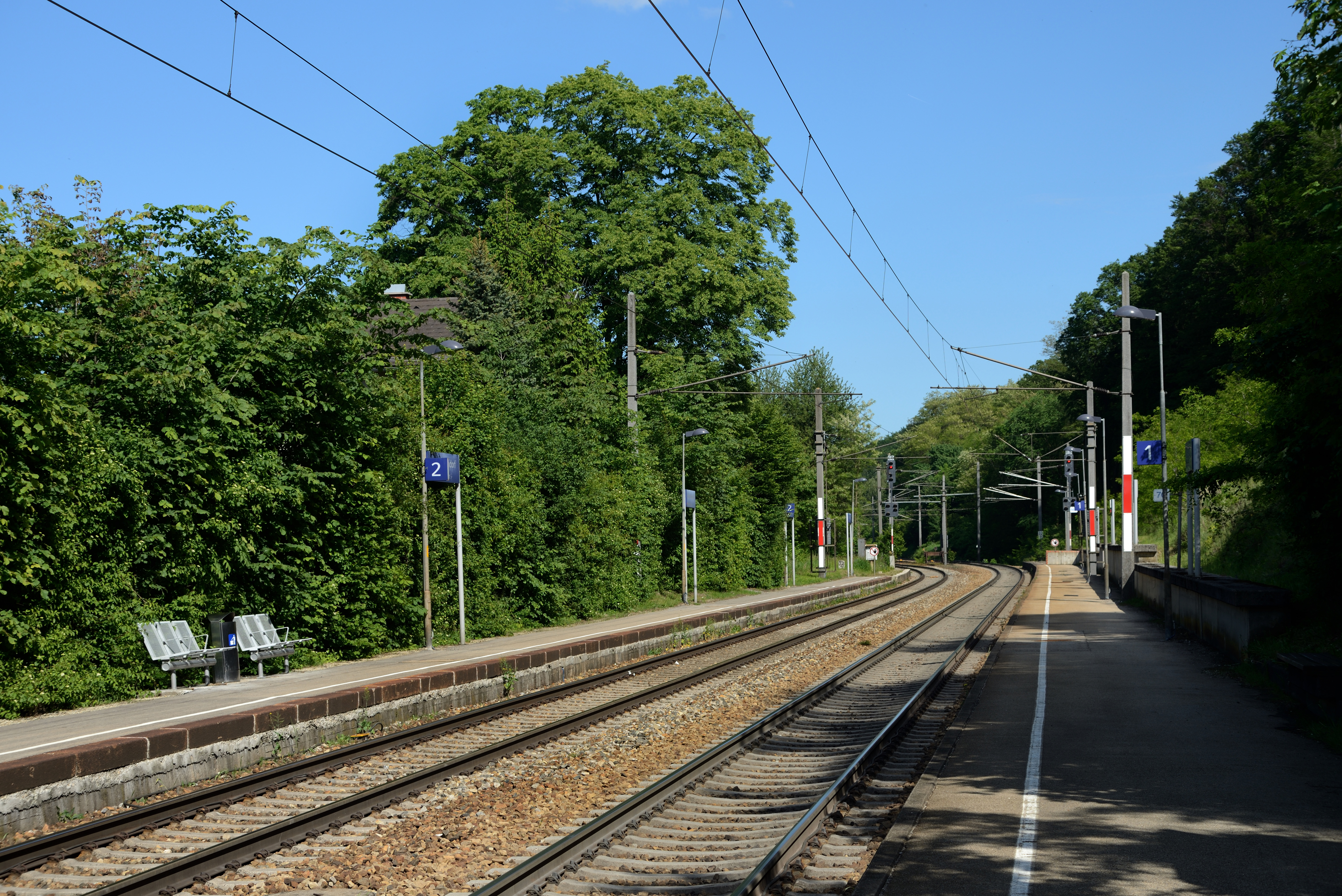

General information
- Location: Bahnhofplatz 1; 3034 Eichgraben; Austria
- Coordinates: 48°10′54.5″N 15°57′27.9″E
- Owner: ÖBB
- Operator: ÖBB
- Platforms: 2 side
- Tracks: 2
Location
- Location within Austria

Unter Oberndorf was a railway station serving Eichgraben in Lower Austria. The station went out of use in December 2024 and is set to be replaced by a newly built station in Maria Anzbach by 2025.
