= Purkersdorf =

- Municipality
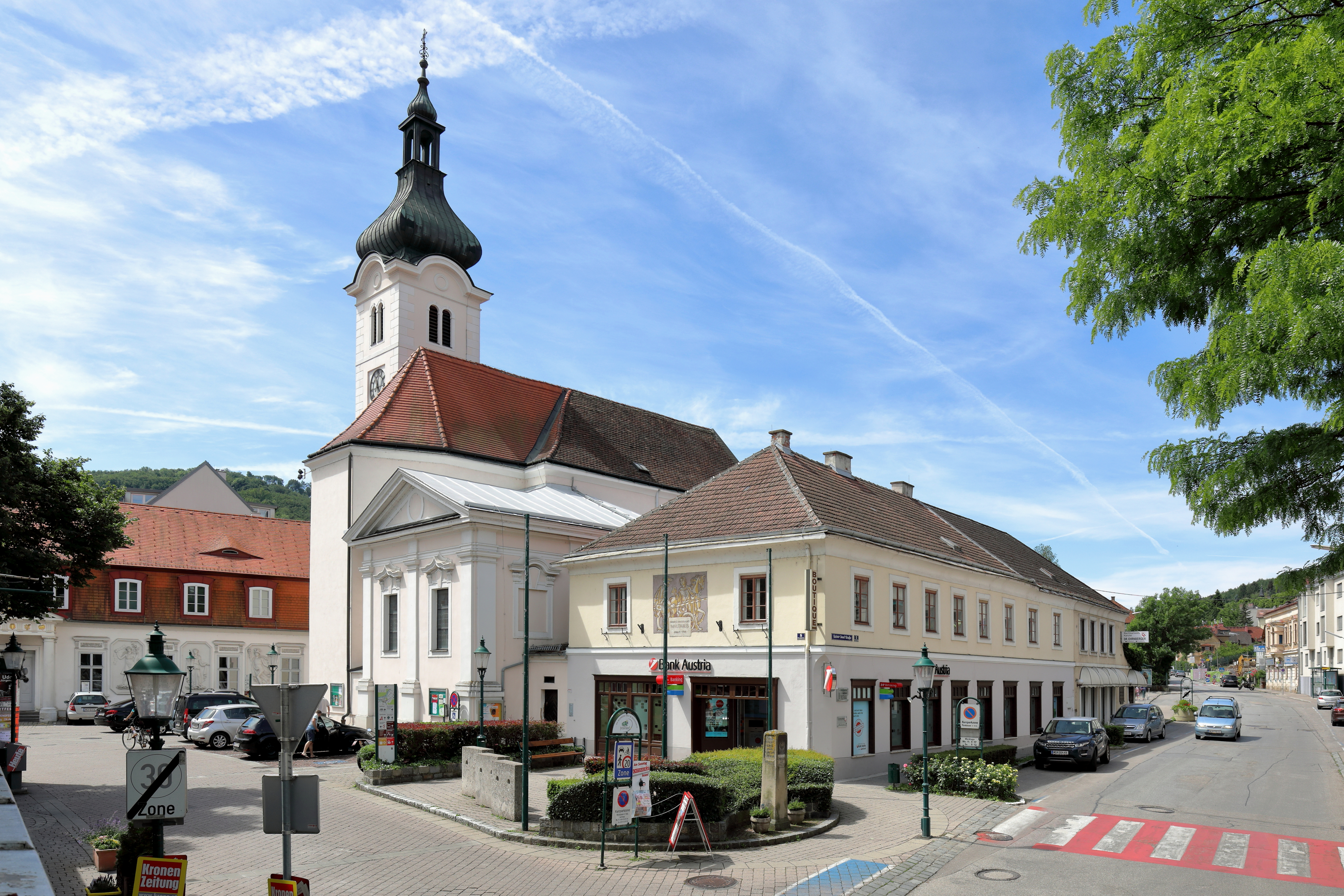
- Town center with the Church of Saint James

- Coat of arms

- Location within Austria
- Coordinates: 48°12′33″N 16°10′45″E
- Country: Austria
- State: Lower Austria
- District: Sankt Pölten-Land

Government
  - Mayor: Jasmin Klemmer-Schlögl (SPÖ)

Area
  - Total: 30.25 km^{2} (11.68 sq mi)
- Elevation: 248 m (814 ft)

Population (2018-01-01)
  - Total: 9,701
  - Density: 320.7/km^{2} (830.6/sq mi)
- Time zone: UTC+1 (CET)
  - Summer (DST): UTC+2 (CEST)
- Postal code: 1140, 3002, 3011, 3012
- Area code: 02231
- Vehicle registration: PL
- Website: www.purkersdorf.at

Purkersdorf is a municipality in the district of Sankt Pölten-Land District, in the Austrian state of Lower Austria. The Sandstein-Wienerwald natural park, a part of the Vienna Woods, is situated on its territory. The municipality belonged to Wien-Umgebung District which was dissolved at the end of 2016.

== Population ==
Historical population
Year	Pop.	±%
1869	1,423	—
1880	1,860	+30.7%
1890	2,102	+13.0%
1900	2,829	+34.6%
1910	3,733	+32.0%
1923	4,556	+22.0%
1934	5,032	+10.4%
1939	4,724	−6.1%
1951	5,262	+11.4%
1961	4,912	−6.7%
1971	5,036	+2.5%
1981	5,147	+2.2%
1991	6,413	+24.6%
2001	7,762	+21.0%
2011	9,185	+18.3%

== Transport ==
Purkersdorf Zentrum station

Purkersdorf is located on the Westbahn, on which REX51 and S50 pass from Wien Westbahnhof to Sankt Pölten / Neulengbach.

Purkersdorf is located in the area of the transport association Verkehrsverbund Ost-Region (VOR).

== Twin towns ==
Purkersdorf is twinned with:

- Bad Säckingen, Germany
- Sanary-sur-Mer, France
- Göstling an der Ybbs, Austria

== Personalities ==
It is the birthplace of economist Gottfried Haberler. Eric Burdon gave a free concert there on 12 June 2010.
