= Neulengbach railway station =

Railway station in Lower Austria

Neulengbach
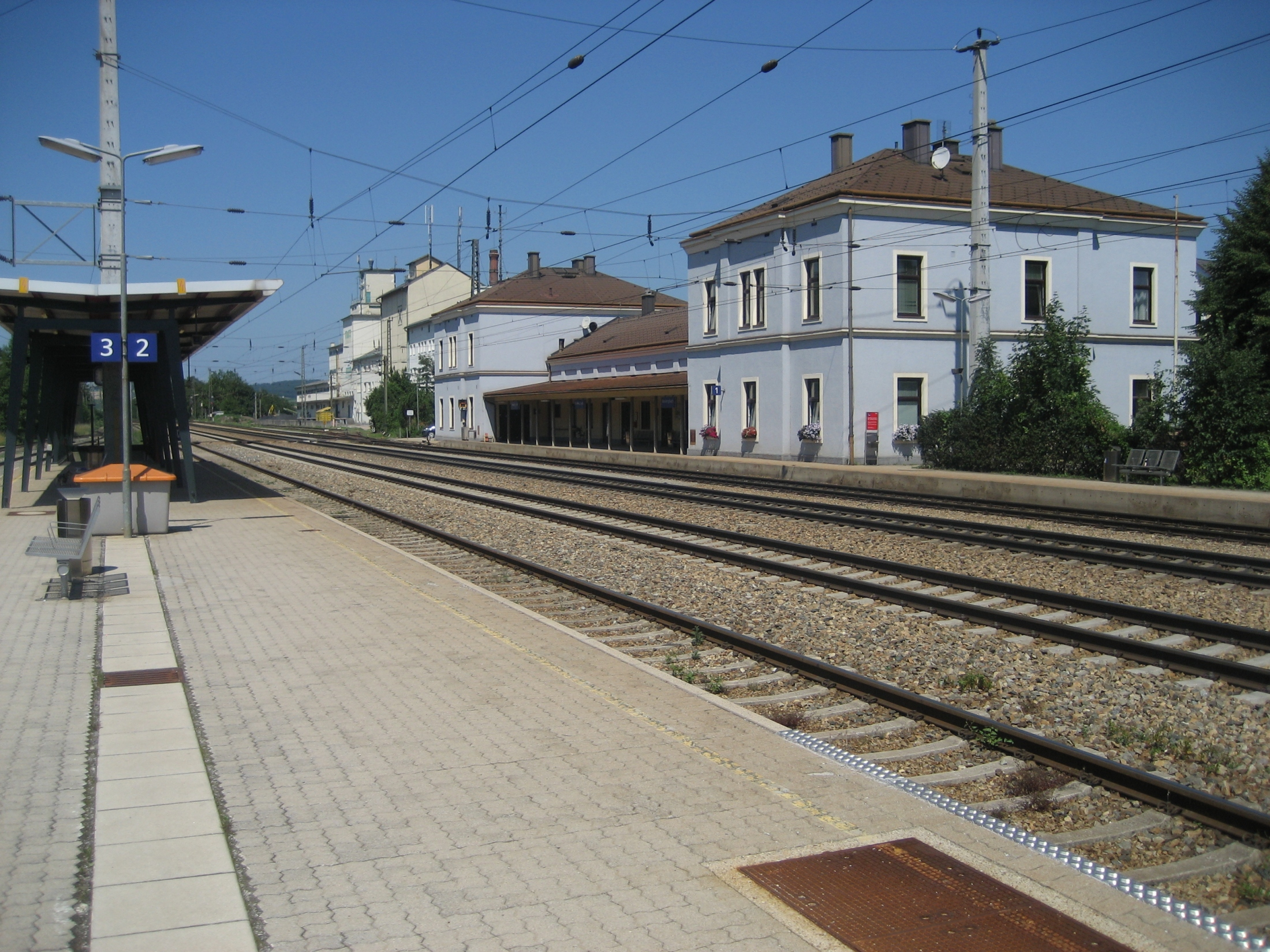

General information
- Location: Bahnhofstraße 14; 3040 Neulengbach; Austria
- Coordinates: 48°11′59.1″N 15°53′31.1″E
- Owner: ÖBB
- Operator: ÖBB
- Platforms: 1 island 1 side
- Tracks: 7

Services
Preceding station	Vienna S-Bahn	Following station
Terminus	S50	Neulengbach Stadt towards Wien Westbahnhof
Location
- Location within Austria

Neulengbach is a railway station serving Neulengbach in Lower Austria. It is the western terminus Vienna S-Bahn line S50.

In 2020, the Austrian Federal Railways (OEBB) invested 7.1 million euros to make Neulengbach Station more accessible. The OEBB installed lifts and access ramps. The modernisation has also included installation of new platform roofs and waiting rooms on both platforms.
