= Hardeggasse station =

Vienna U-Bahn station

Hardeggasse
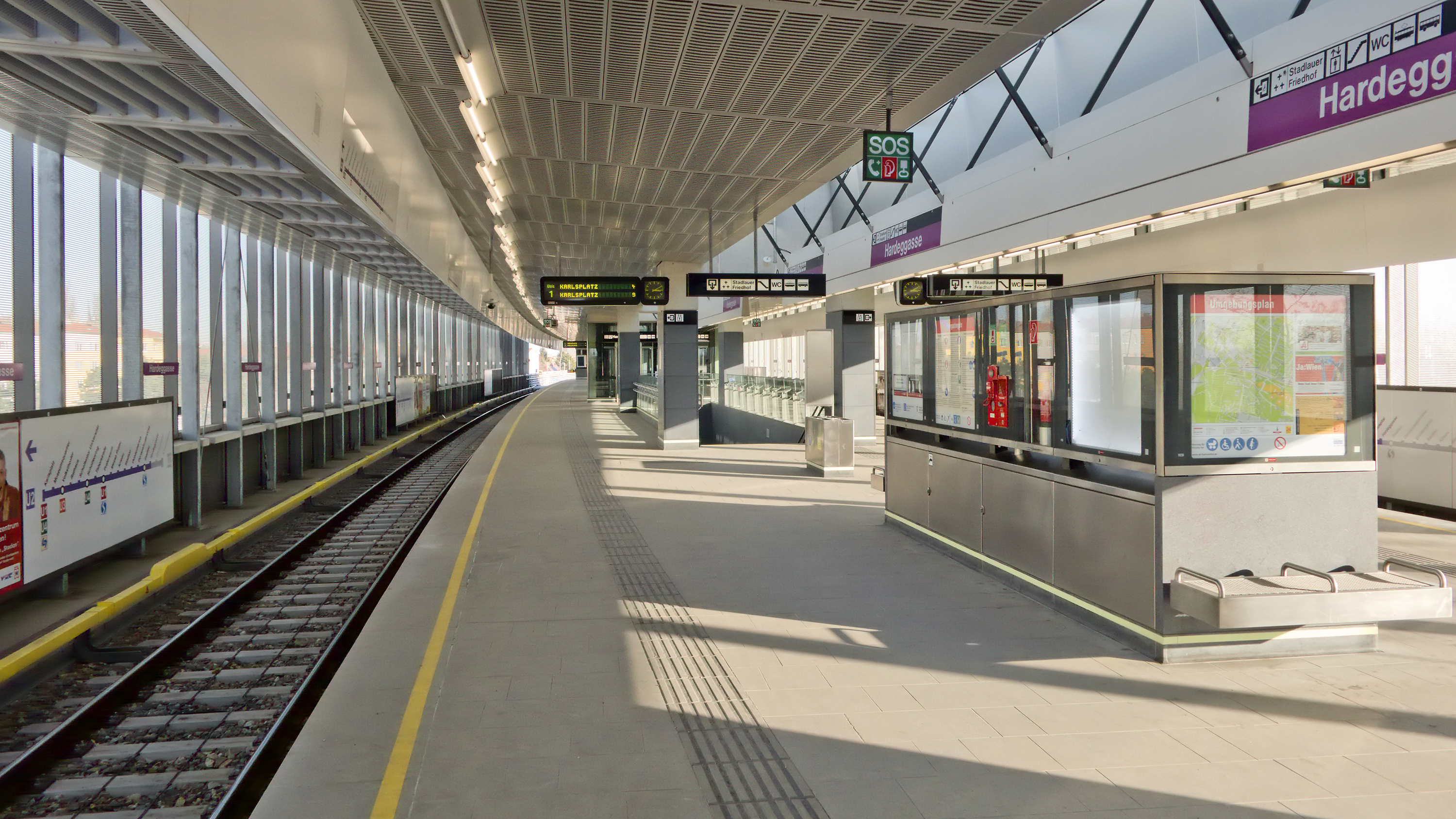

General information
- Location: Donaustadt, Vienna; Austria
- Coordinates: 48.2209°N 16.4577°E
- Tram routes: 25
- Bus routes: 92A, 95A, 96A, N26

History
- Opened: 2 October 2010

Services
Preceding station	Wiener Linien	Following station
Stadlau toward Karlsplatz	U2	Donauspital toward Seestadt
Location

Hardeggasse is a station on the U2 of the Vienna U-Bahn. It is located in Donaustadt, the 22nd district of Vienna. The station was opened on 2 October 2010 as part of the third expansion of the U2 between Stadion and Aspernstraße.

== About ==
The station sits on the border of Stadlau and Aspern in Donaustadt. It lies between Donauspital to the east and Stadlau to the west. It was inaugurated on 2 October 2010 with the opening of the third section of the U2 line, between Stadion and Aspernstraße, crossing the Danube via the Donaustadtbrücke. Four buses - the 92A, 95A, 96A, and the 26 night bus - stop at the station, alongside the 25 tram.

The station was built above ground, next to the Stadlau cemetery, with two stairs and two lifts leading to the island platform. To keep the building costs cheap and to withstand the heavy foot traffic, the station was outfitted with granite floors, walls, and ceilings. Natural sources of light were integrated into the design to enhance the station’s openness, contributing to a brighter space.

The station is surrounded by apartments, sits opposite a Spar supermarket, and has an Anker bakery and a pizza place.

== Name ==
The station is named after Hardegggasse, a road which runs perpendicular to the tracks and is named after the Hardegg dynasty. Following the German orthography reform of 1996, which the city agreed to adopt, the station should have been named Hardegggasse (Hardegg-gasse, with gasse meaning "street"). However, the city, without providing an explanation, opted for Hardeggasse.

== Gallery ==
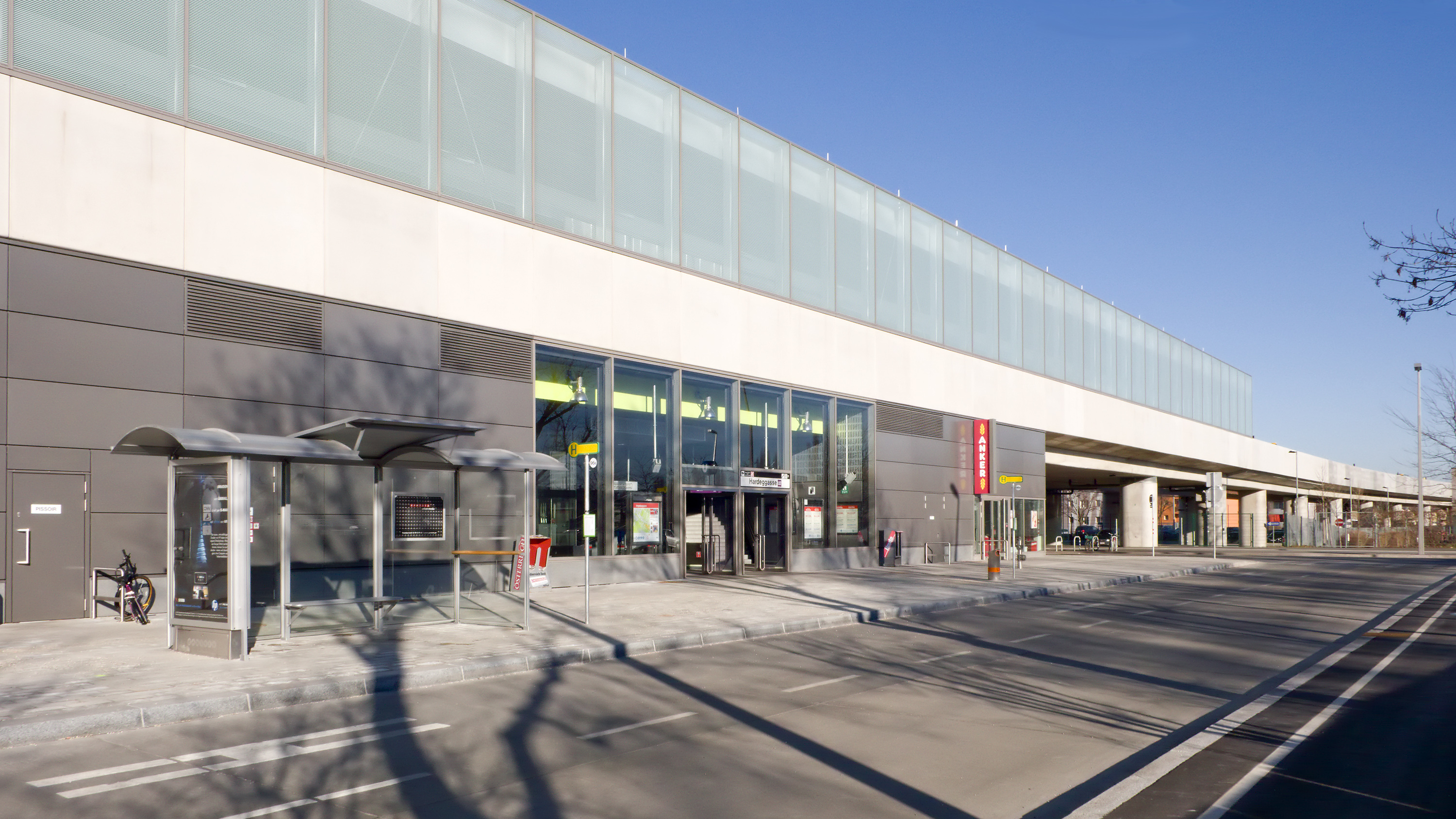
Entrance to the station

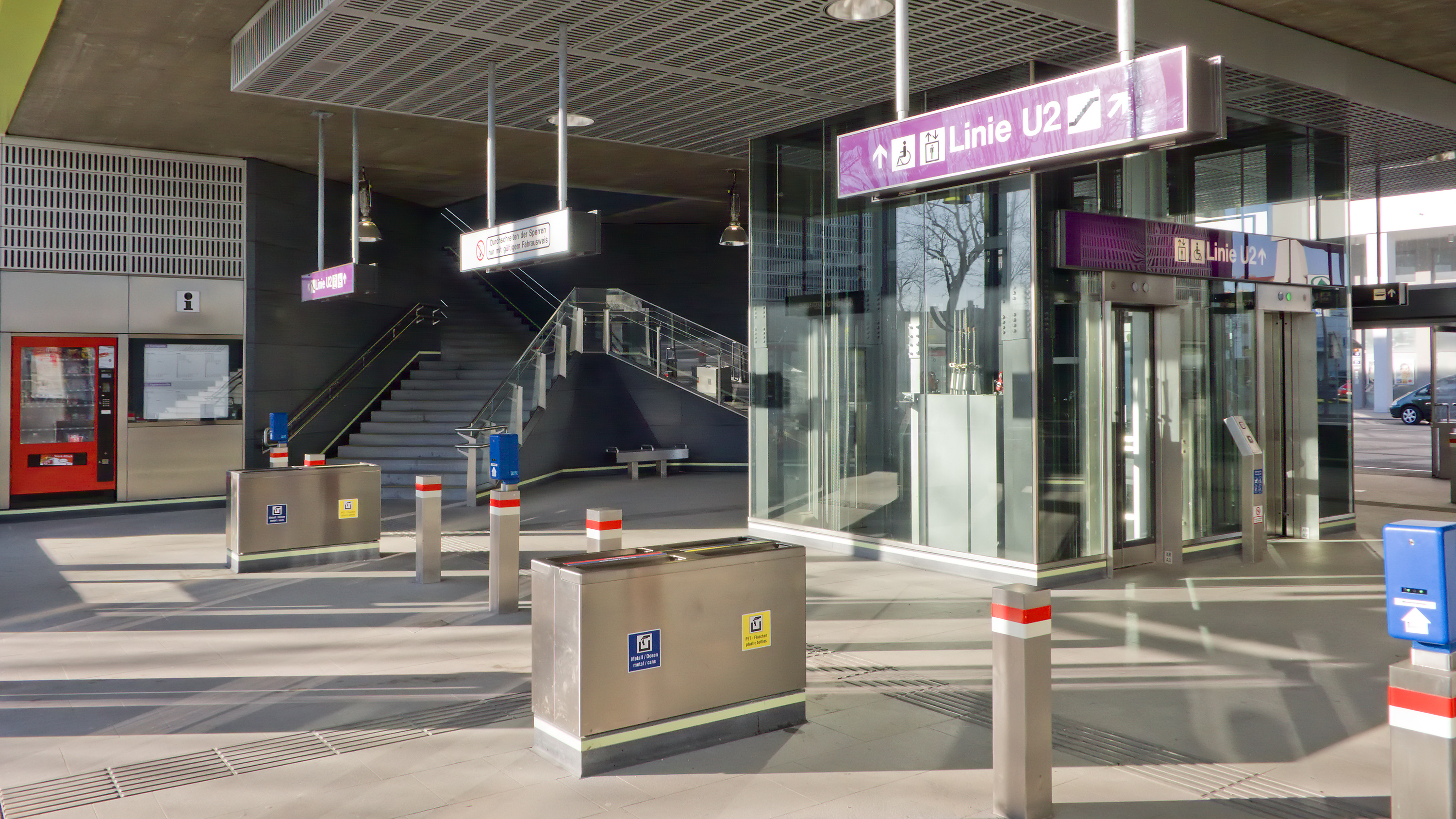
Interior

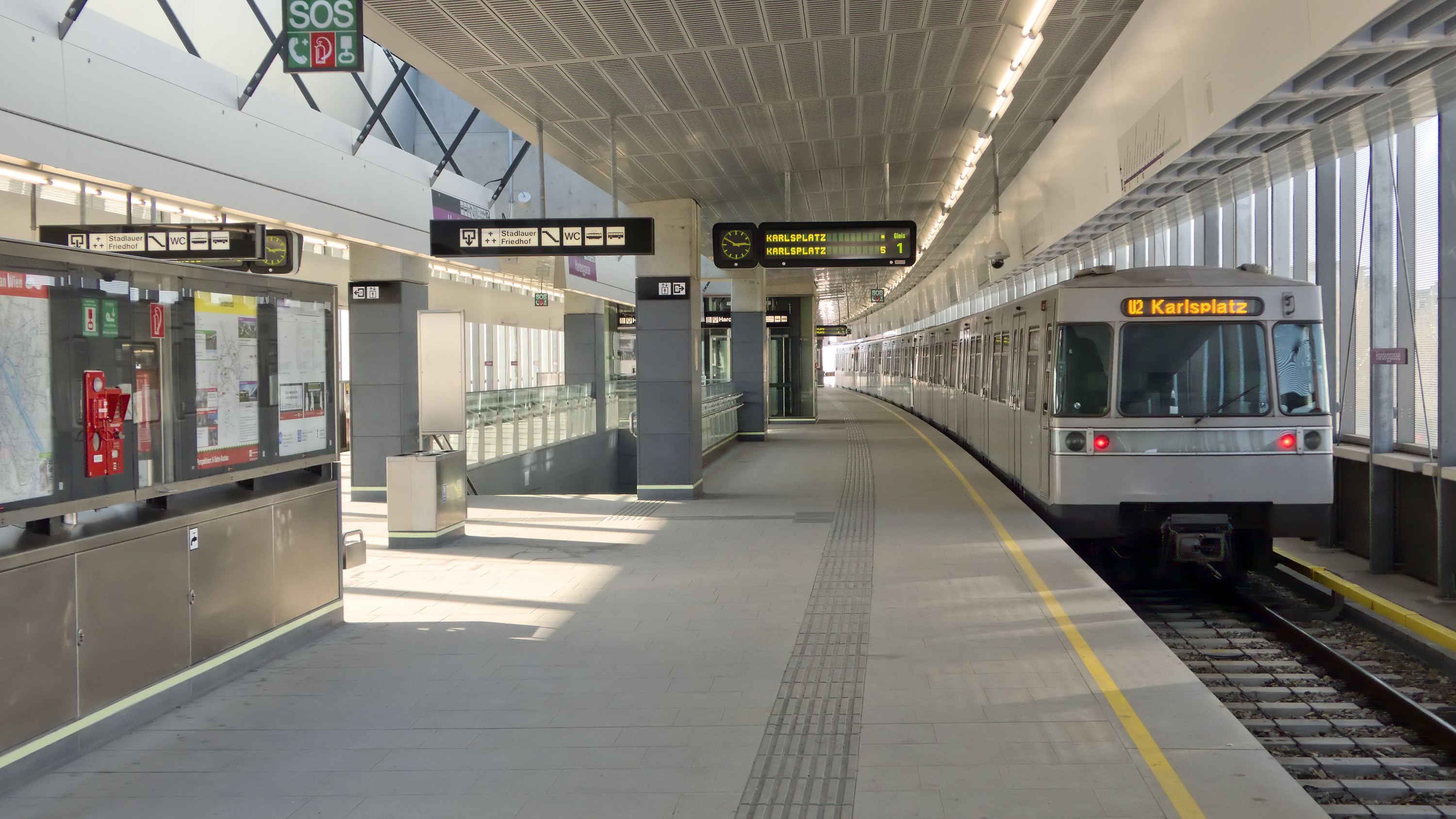
Platform

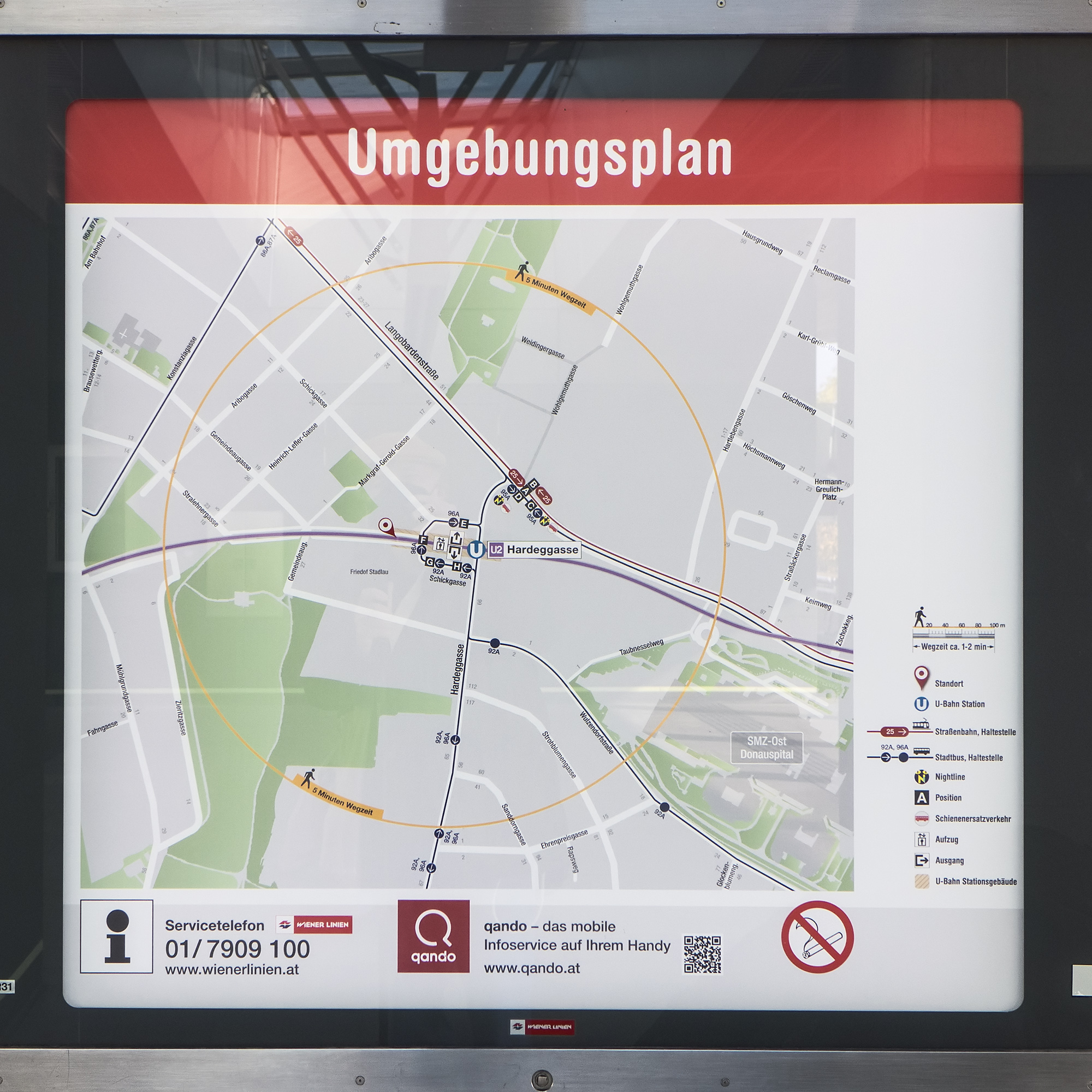
Map of the surrounding area
