= Stadlau station =

Vienna U-Bahn station

Stadlau
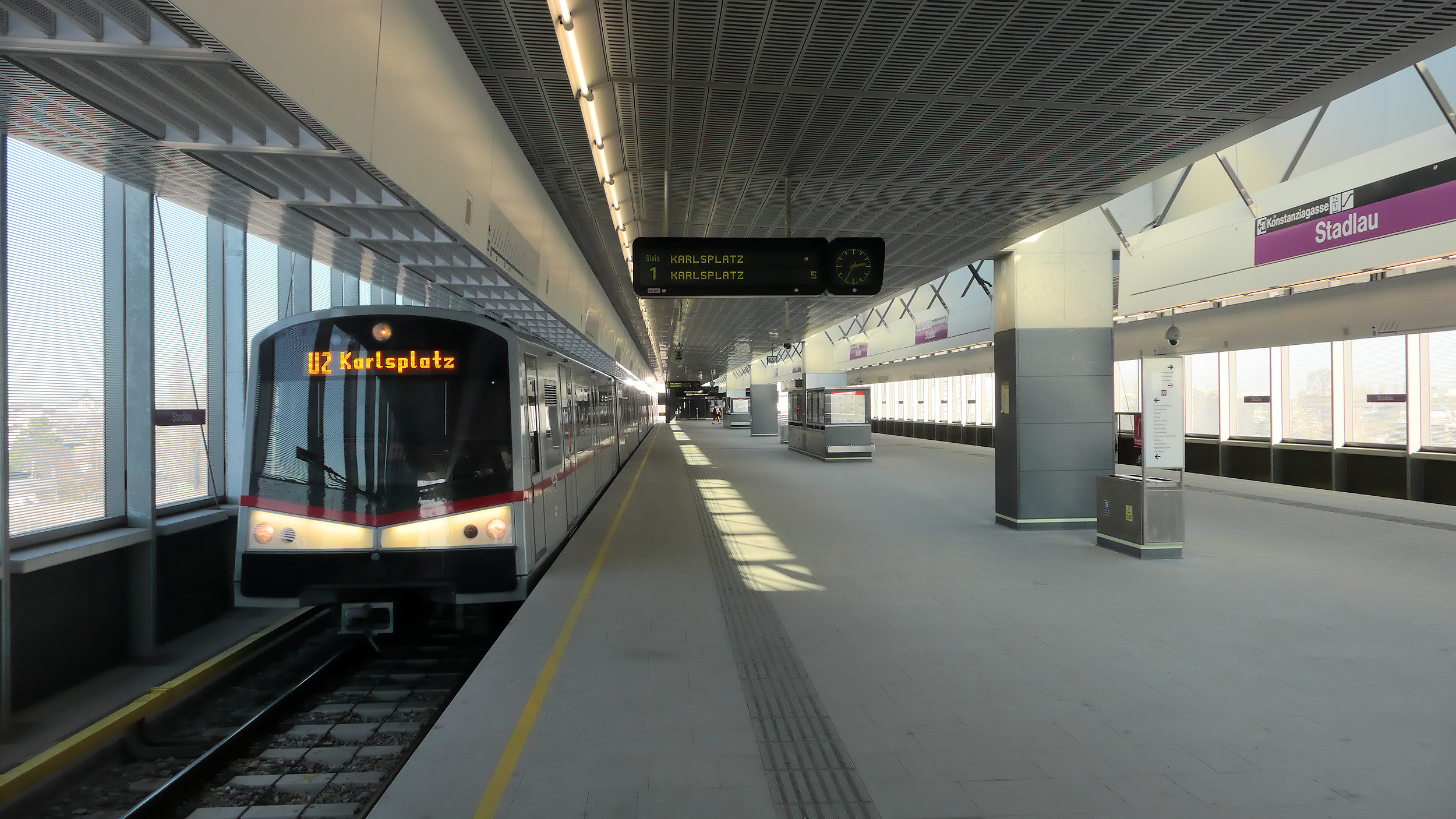

General information
- Location: Donaustadt, Vienna; Austria
- Coordinates: 48.2198°N 16.4496°E
- Lines: (Interchange)
- Bus routes: 86A, 87A, 94A
- Connections: REX8, R81, S80

History
- Opened: 2 October 2010

Services
Preceding station	Wiener Linien	Following station
Donaustadtbrücke toward Karlsplatz	U2	Hardeggasse toward Seestadt
Location

Stadlau is a station on the U2 of the Vienna U-Bahn. It is located in Donaustadt, the 22nd district of Vienna. The station was opened on 2 October 2010 as part of the third expansion of the U2 between Stadion and Aspernstraße. The station is conjoined with the Wien Stadlau railway station.

== About ==
The station is located in Stadlau, Donaustadt. It was inaugurated on 2 October 2010 with the opening of the third section of the U2 line, connecting Stadion and Aspernstraße and crossing the Danube via the Donaustadtbrücke. The station is linked to the Wien Stadlau railway station, served by the REX 8 and R 81 operated by the Austrian Federal Railways (ÖBB), as well as the S80 of the Vienna S-Bahn. It is served by the Wiener Linien bus lines 92A, 95A, and 96A.

The newly constructed platforms are located further south along Kaisermühlenstraße and are each designed as dual platforms for both the ÖBB and the U-Bahn. The U2 line runs approximately 14 meters above ground level. State-of-the-art noise barriers were installed, featuring highly sound-absorbent aluminum panels up to 2.5 meters in height. The station is equipped with lifts and escalators, making it accessible.

== Art ==
Since 2010, the figure “Nepomuk” by Tyrolean artist Werner Feiersinger has been located on a supporting pillar on the east side of the station building. It references Saint John of Nepomuk (c. 1350–1392), the patron saint of bridges, and corresponds to the silhouette of the Nepomuk figure on the Charles Bridge in Prague. The figure was crafted from stainless steel by the Buchsbaum metal workshop in Waldhausen, Upper Austria, and painted red by Feiersinger.

== Gallery ==
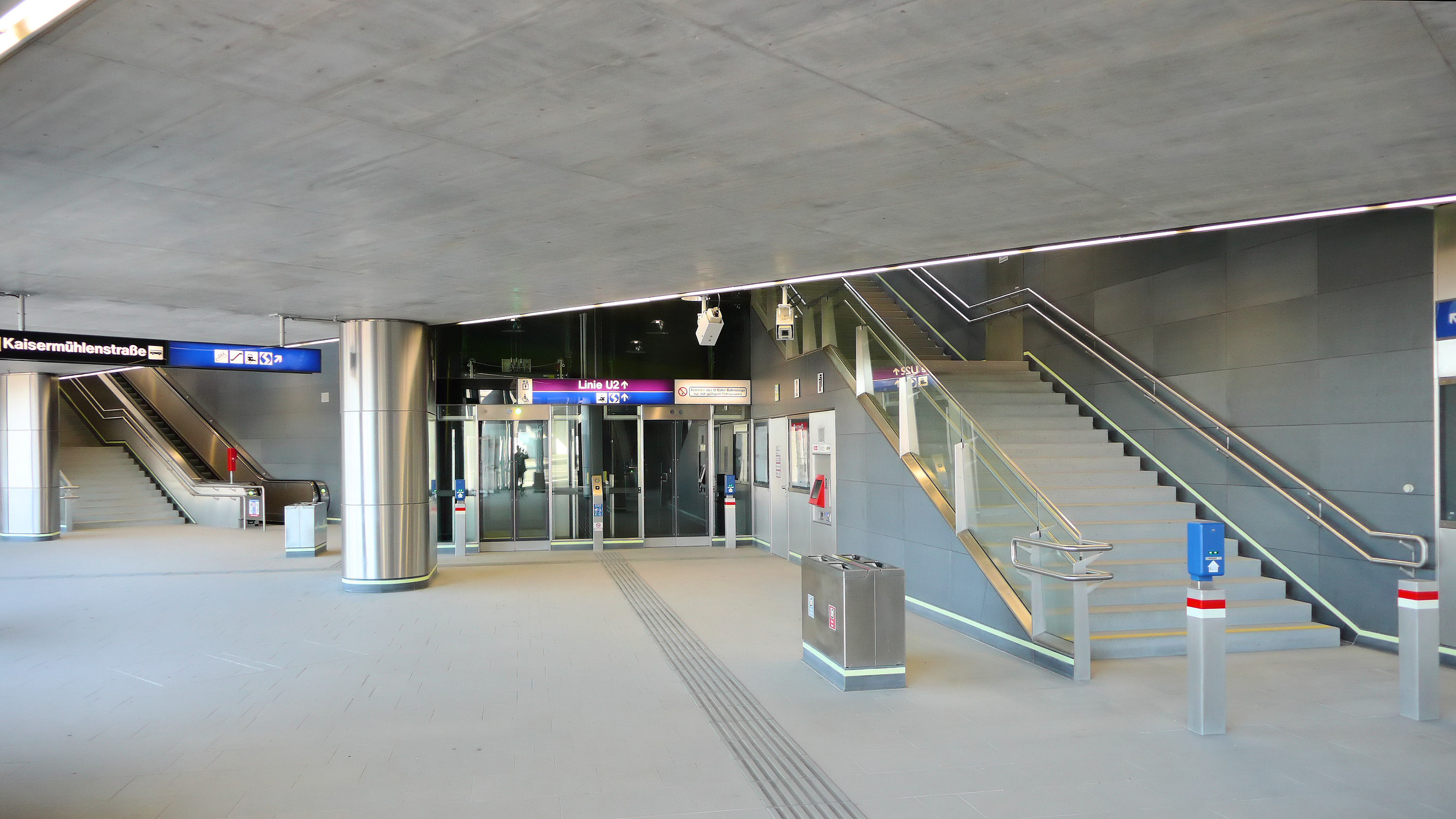
The interior

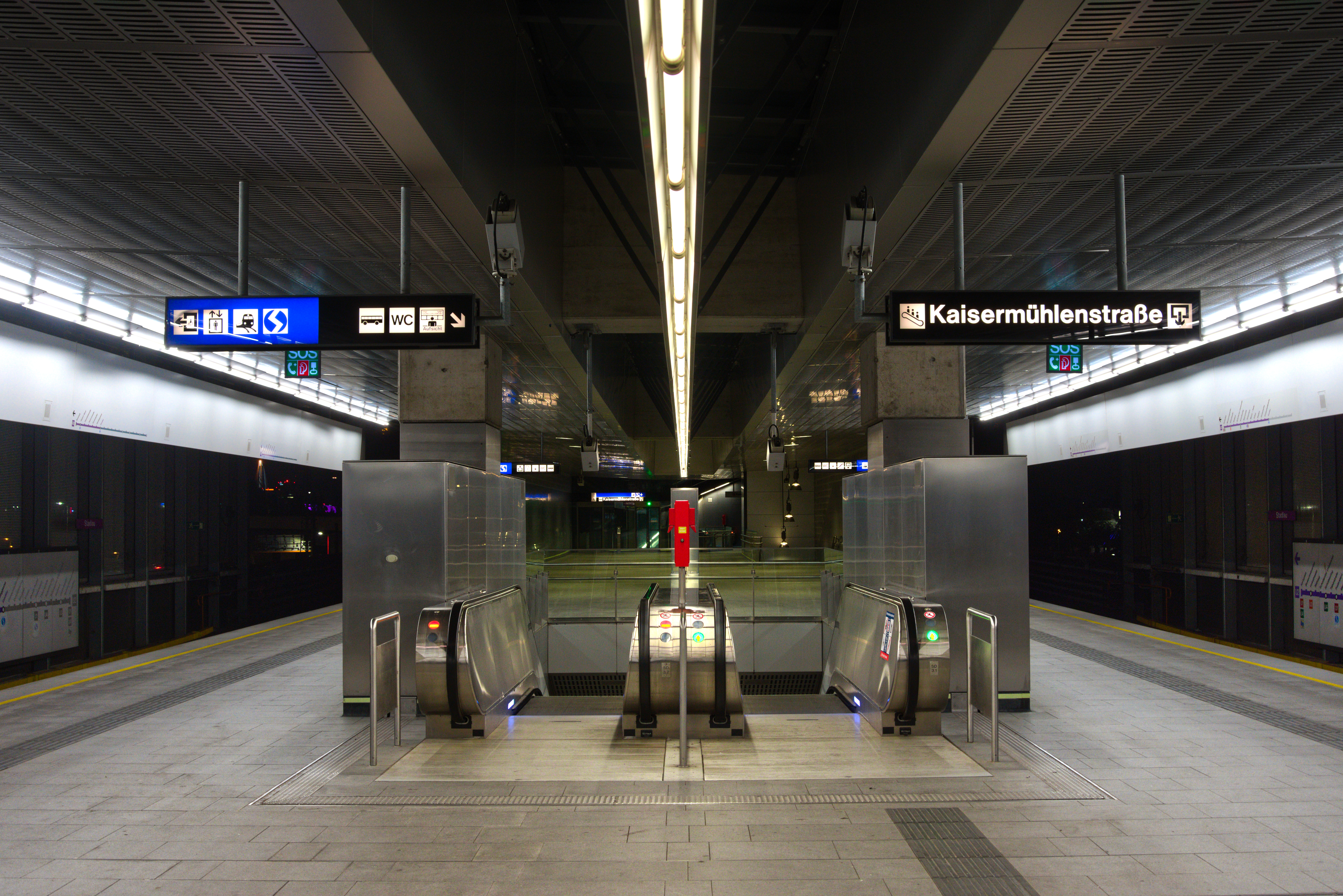
The platform

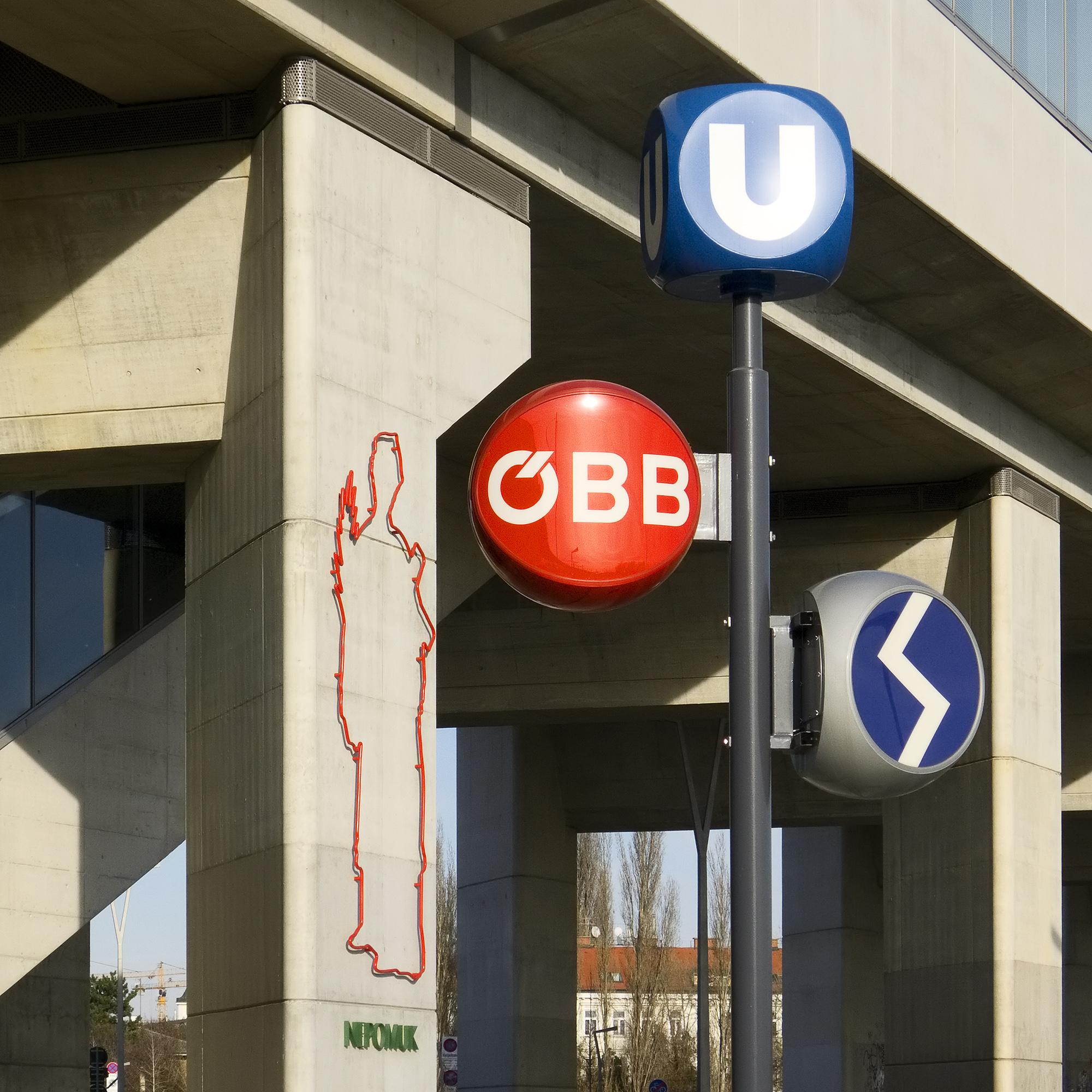
Nepomuk figure

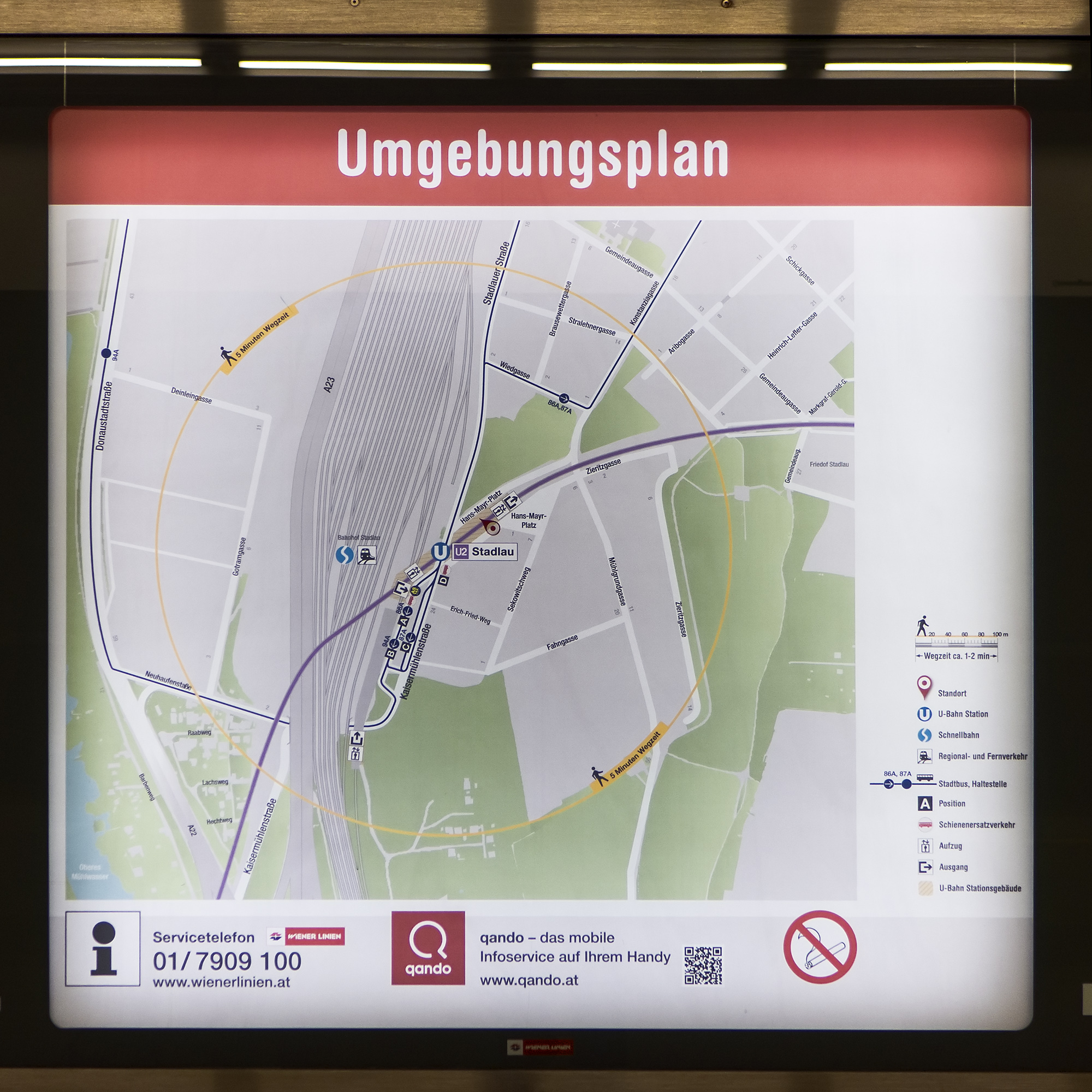
Map of the surrounding area
