= Donauspital station =

Vienna U-Bahn station

Donauspital
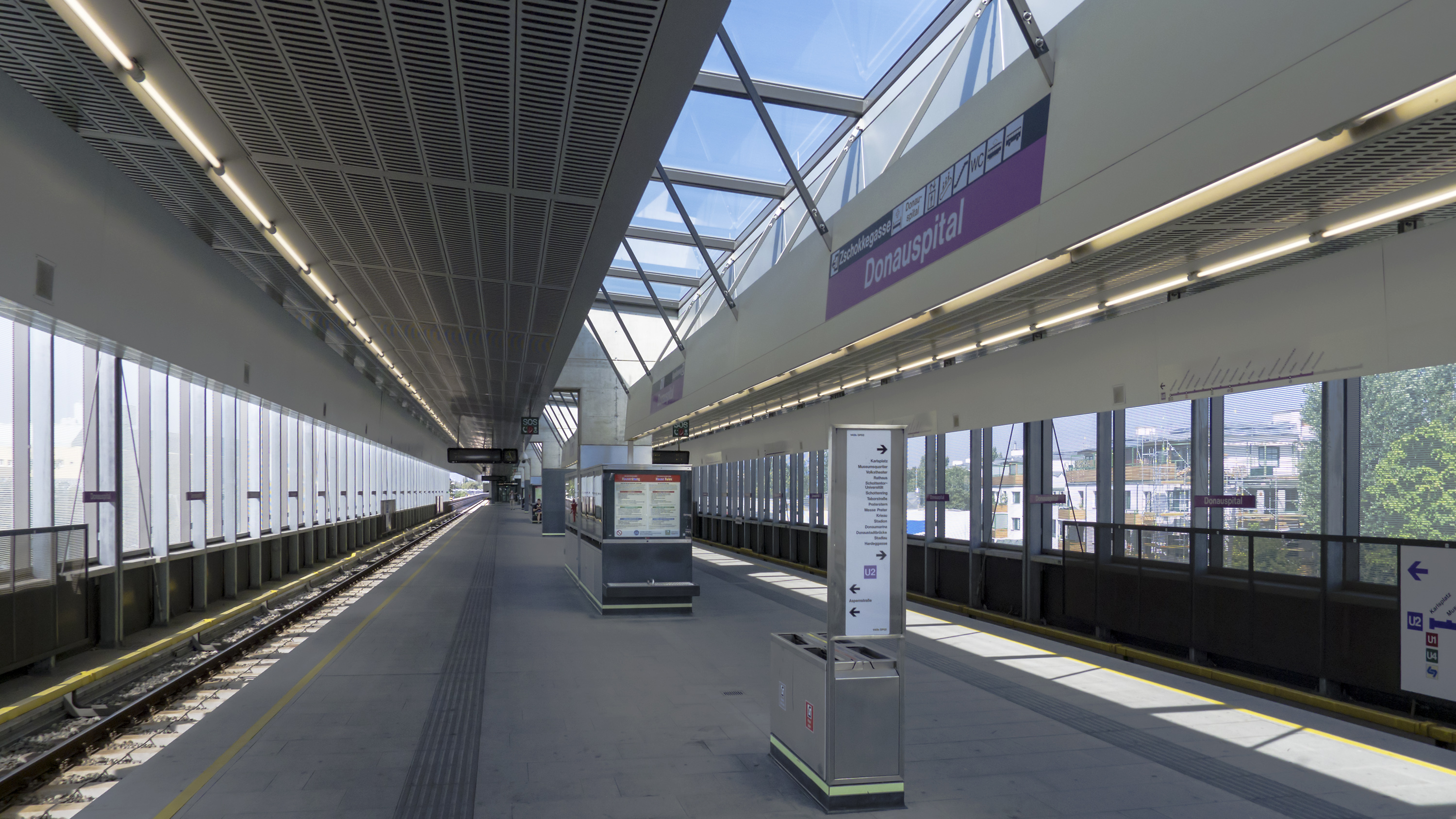

General information
- Location: Donaustadt, Vienna; Austria
- Coordinates: 48.2194°N 16.4666°E
- Tram routes: 25
- Bus routes: 95A, 26N

History
- Opened: 2 October 2010

Services
Preceding station	Wiener Linien	Following station
Hardeggasse toward Karlsplatz	U2	Aspernstraße toward Seestadt
Location

Donauspital is a station on the U2 of the Vienna U-Bahn. It is located in Aspern, Donaustadt, the 22nd district of Vienna. The station was opened in 2010 as part of the third expansion of the U2 between Stadion and Aspernstraße.

== About ==
The station lies opposite the main entrance to Klinik Donaustadt, the second-largest hospital in Vienna, which had previously been disconnected from the city’s metro network. It was inaugurated on 2 October 2010 with the opening of the third section of the U2 line, between Stadion and Aspernstraße, crossing the Danube via the Donaustadtbrücke, as the penultimate stop. The station became Vienna’s 100th metro station.

It features two tracks and an island platform with multiple exits leading to the medical centre on Zschokkegasse and the geriatric hospital on Kapellenweg. The station has two escalators and two lifts, one leading to the bus and tram stops opposite the hospital, the other to Tamariskengasse in the north.

The station is also served by the 95A bus, the 25 tram, and the N26 night bus operated by Wiener Linien.

== Art ==
Before the construction of the station was finalised, a competition was held for the station’s artistic concept, won by German artist Christian Jankowski. Together with architect Paul Katzberger, Jankowski integrated 18 aluminum inscriptions and symbols throughout the station in three muted colors. The project was named Die große Geste (The grand gesture) and was done in coordination with Kunst im öffentlichen Raum Wien (Art in public spaces Vienna).

== Gallery ==
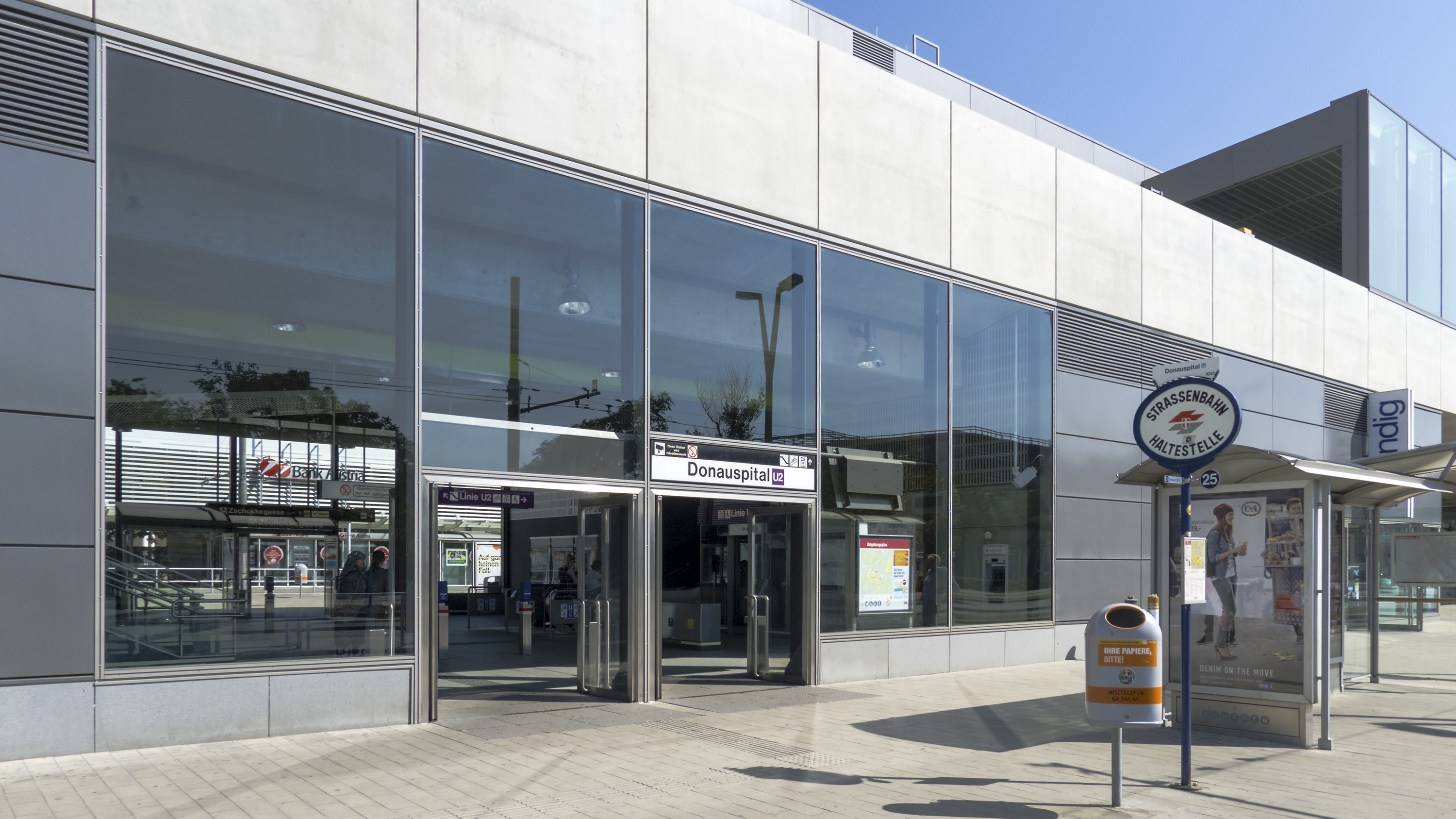
Entrance to the station

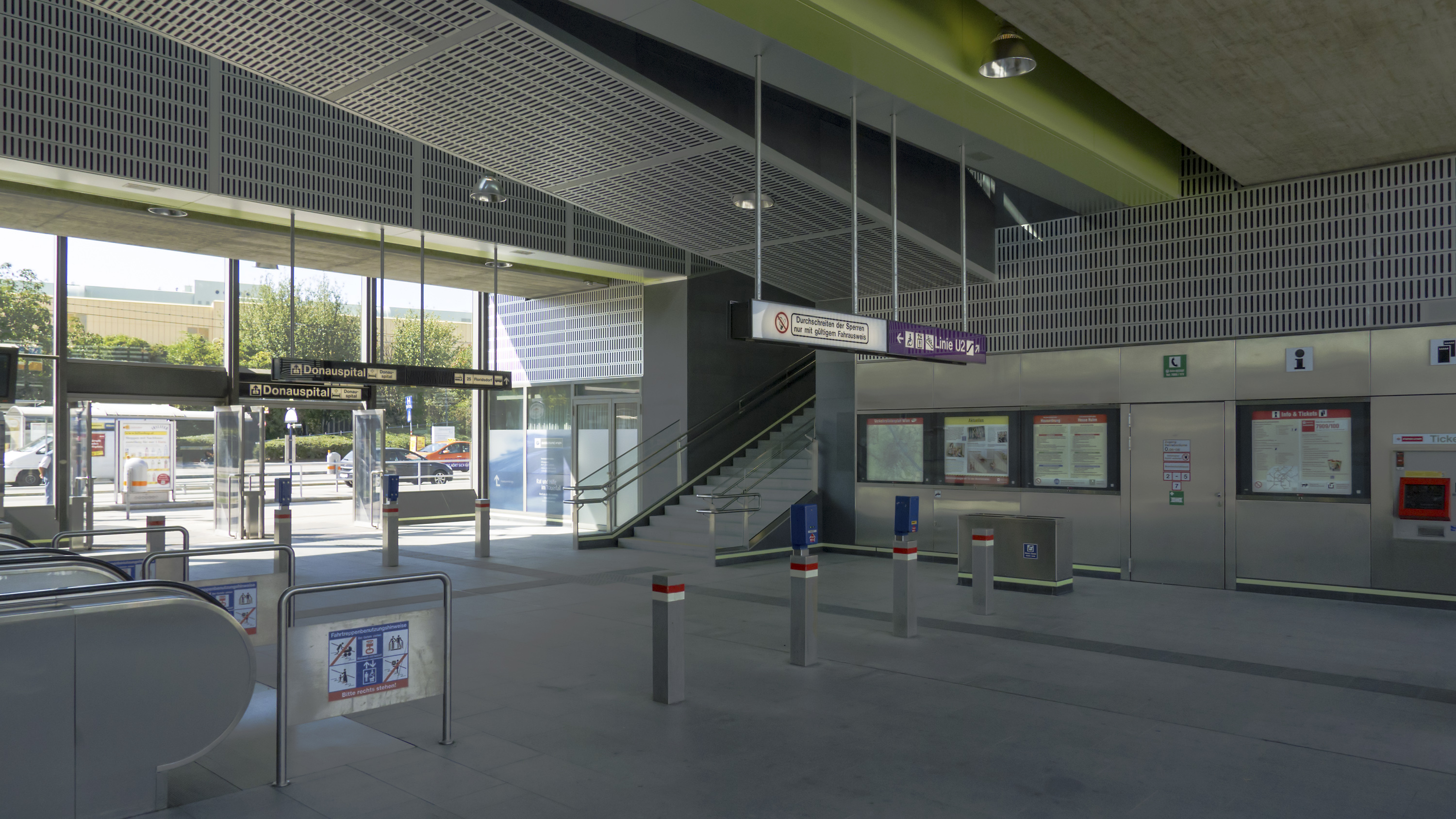
Interior

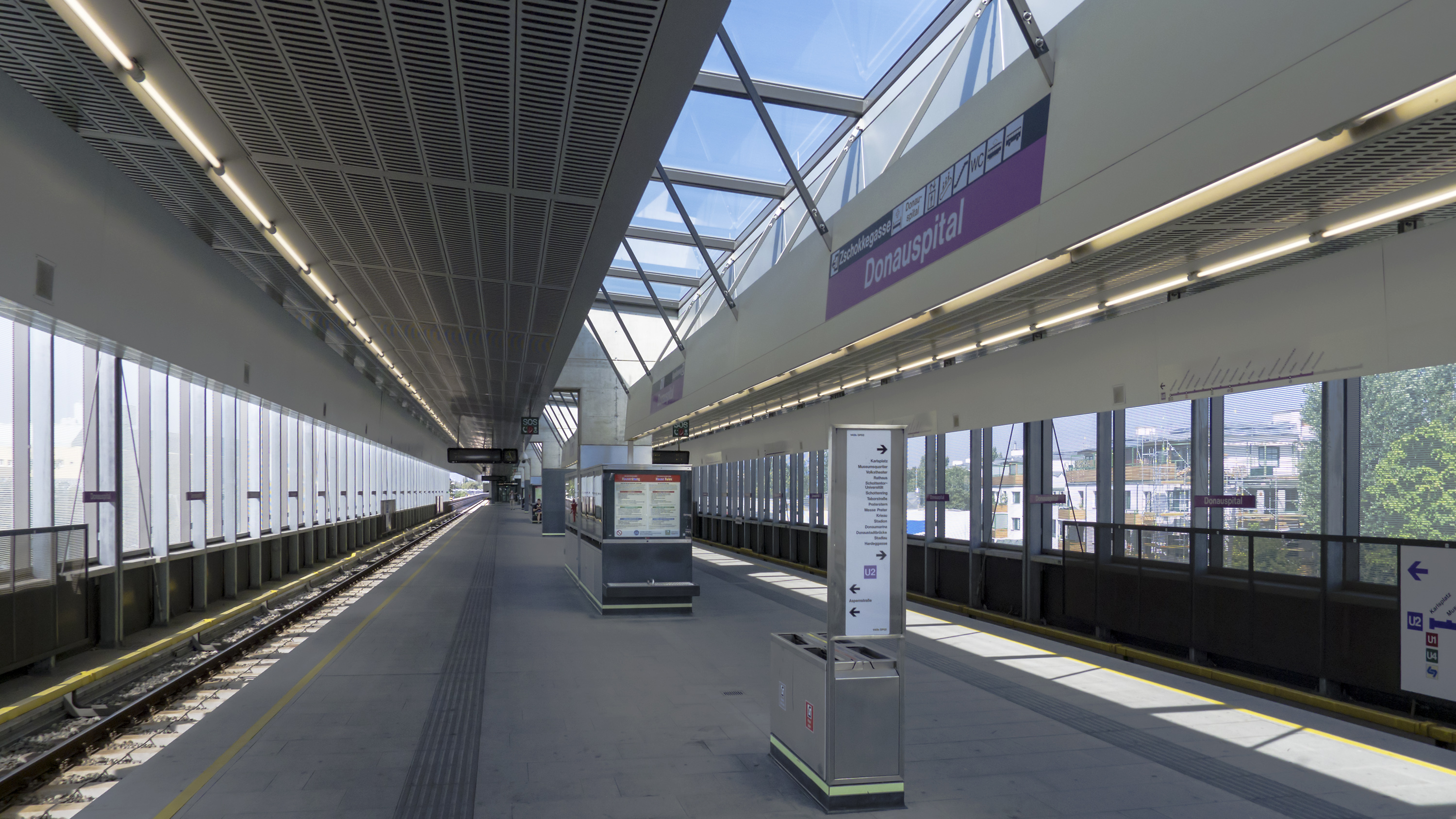
The platform

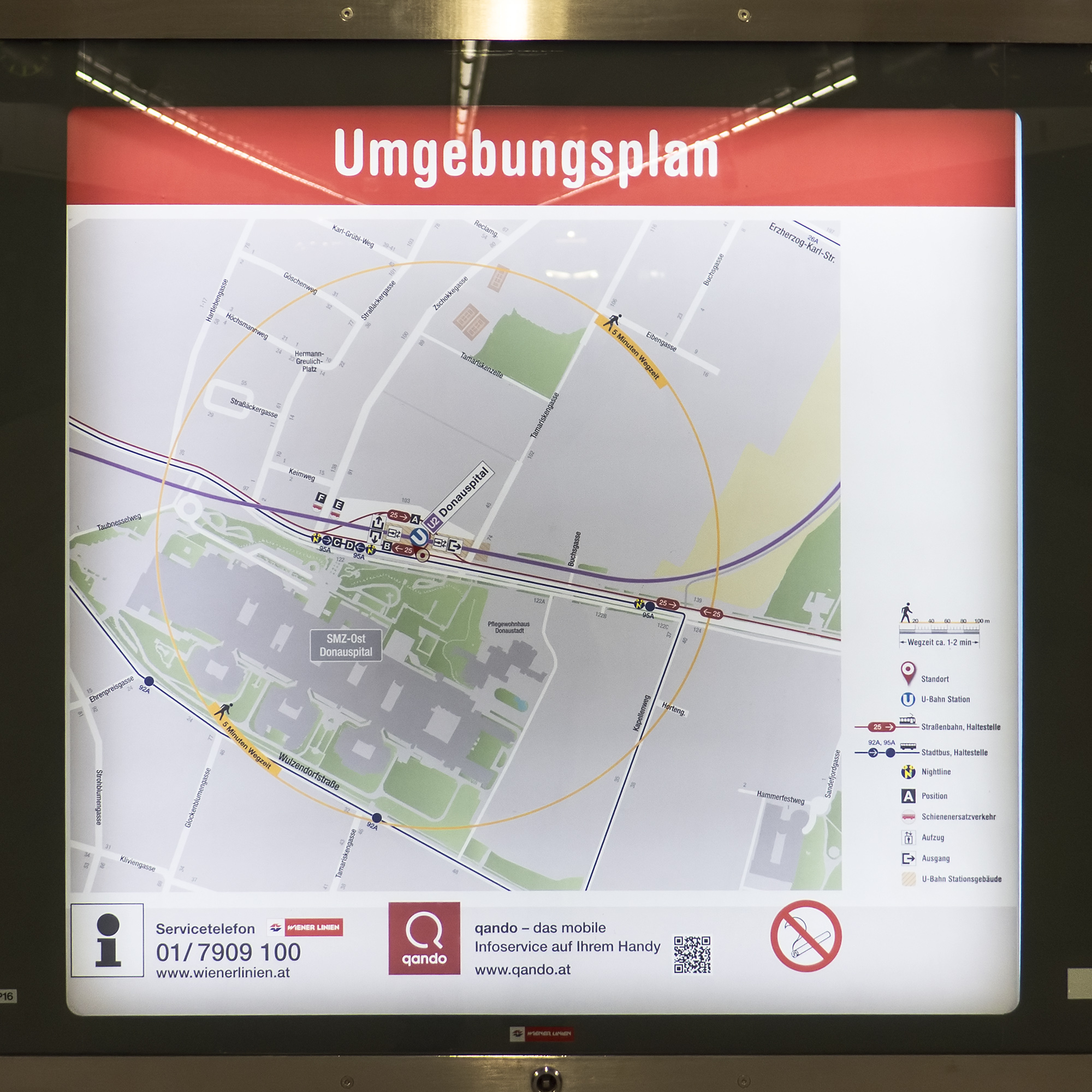
Map of the surrounding area
