= Aspern =

Part of Donaustadt, Vienna, Austria

Coordinates: 48°13′04″N 16°29′00″E

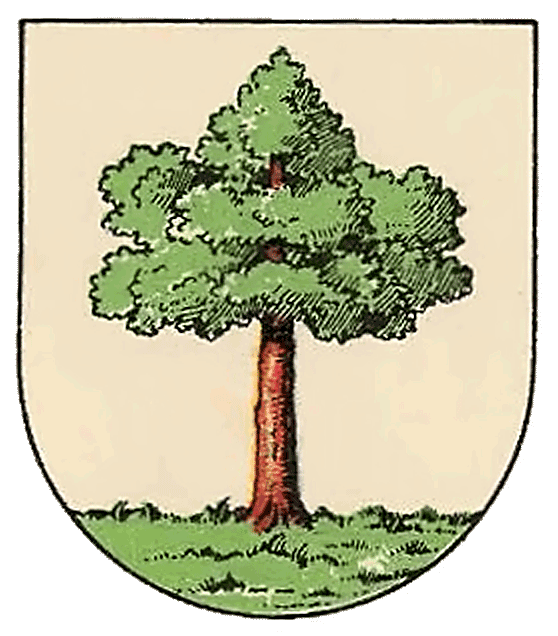
Coat of arms

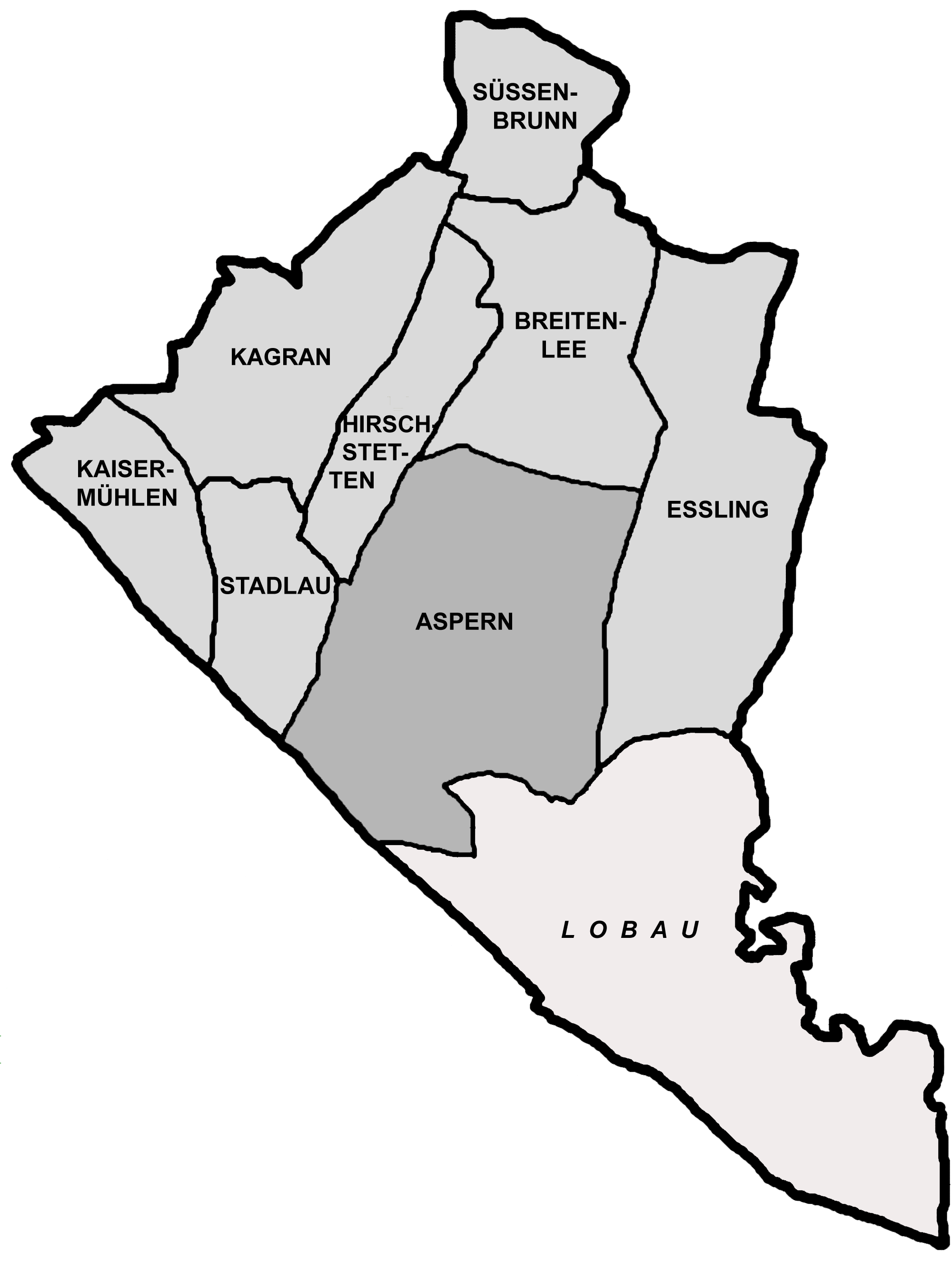
Location within Donaustadt

Aspern (German pronunciation: [ˈaspɐn]) is a neighbourhood in Vienna, Austria, within Donaustadt, the 22nd district of Vienna. It has a population of 52,375 as of 2023 and covers an area of 19.89 km^{2}.

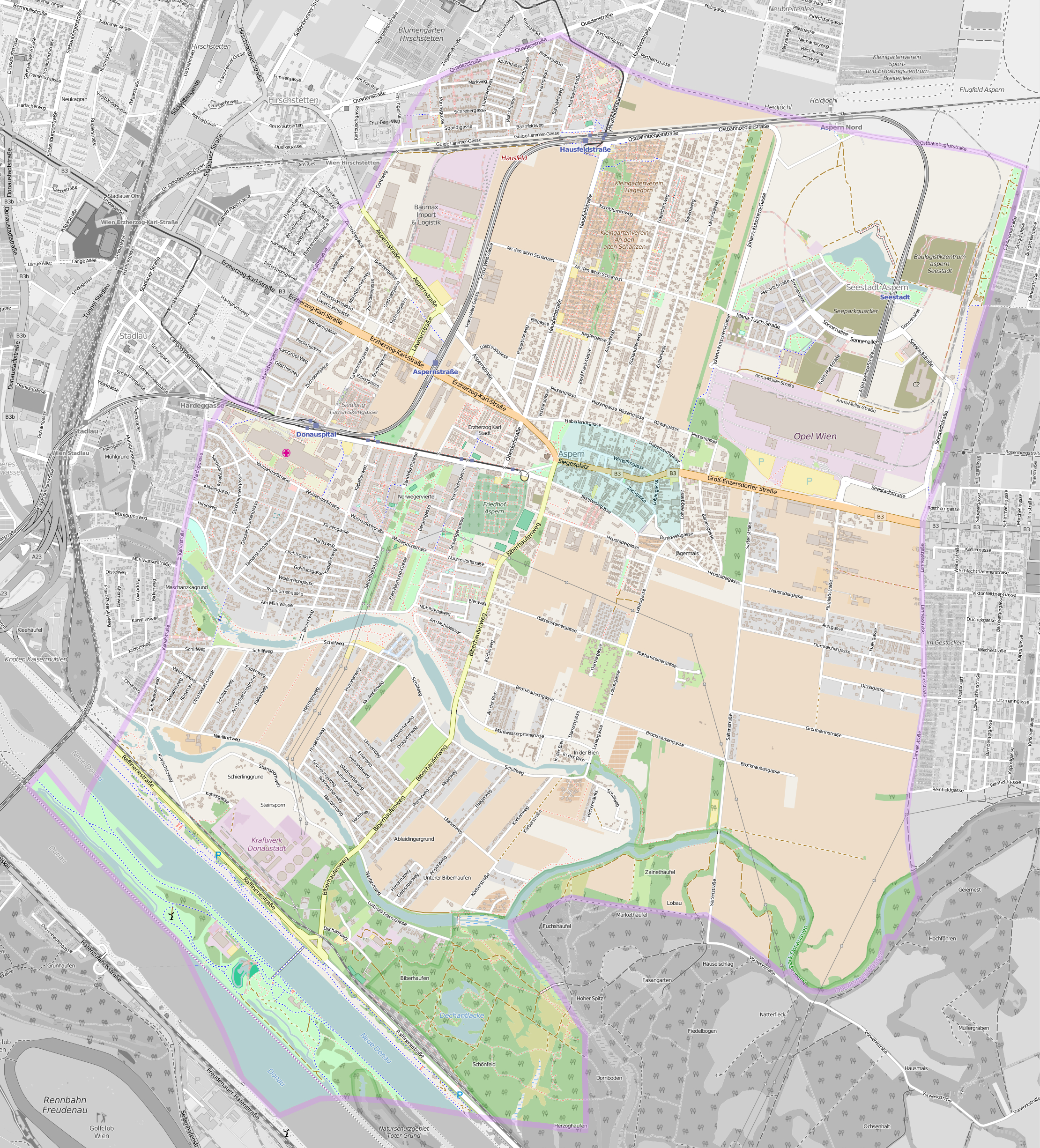
Aspern with the historic town centre highlighted in turquoise

== History ==
The area is known for the Battle of Aspern-Essling, which was fought in the nearby Lobau on 21 and 22 May 1809 during the War of the Fifth Coalition. In the battle, the Austrian army, led by Archduke Charles, repelled an advance by Napoleon; it was the closest the French emperor had come to being defeated since his rise to power. In 1858, a large stone lion sculpture was installed in front of St. Martin's Church to commemorate the battle and the Austrian soldiers who died defending Austria against Napoleon.

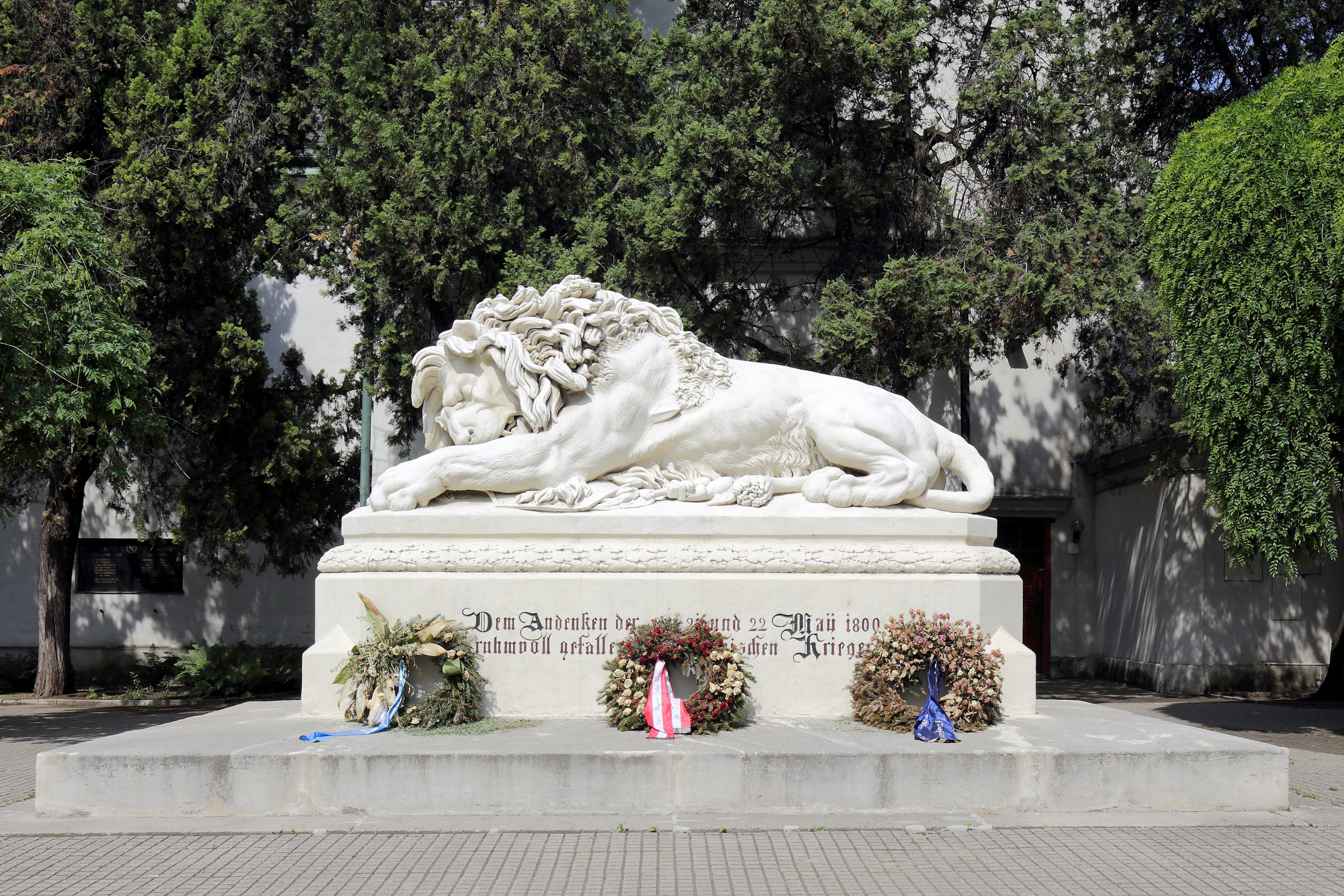
The Lion of Aspern

In 1904, the formerly independent village was incorporated into Vienna as part of the 21st district, Floridsdorf. It only became part of the newly created 22nd district, Donaustadt, in 1946.

In 1912, the Aspern airfield was opened to the north of the town centre. This was the centre of Austrian civilian and military aviation until the Second World War. From 1945 to 1955, Aspern was part of the Soviet sector of Vienna and the airfield was mainly used by the Soviet occupying forces. The airfield was closed in 1977 and is now the location of Seestadt Aspern.

== Geography ==
Aspern borders four other Katastralgemeinden of Donaustadt: Stadlau, Hirschstetten, Breitenlee, and Essling, as well as the Lobau. With an area of 19.88 km^{2} it is the second largest part of Donaustadt, only behind the uninhabited Lobau.

== Features ==
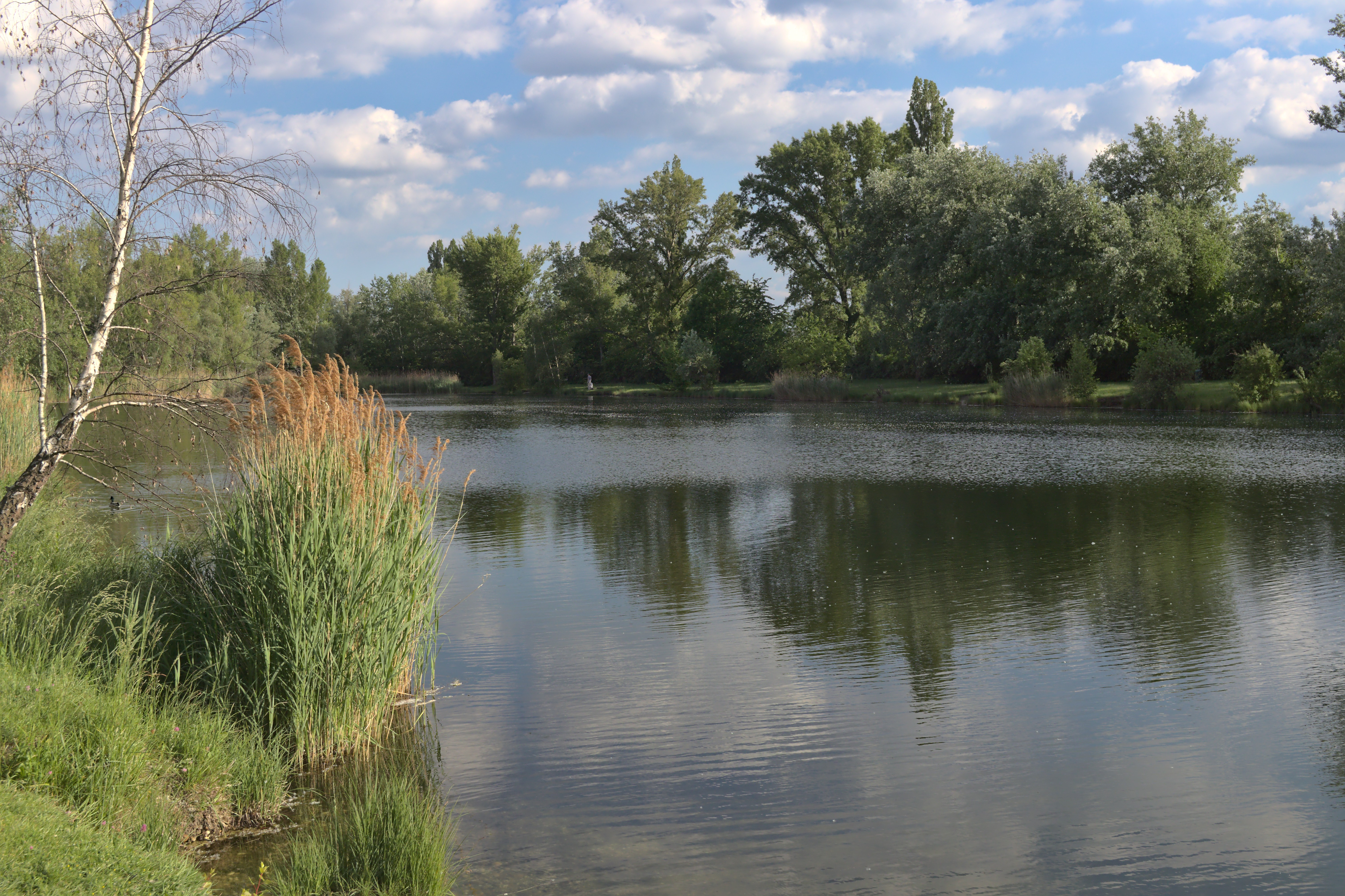
The Mühlwasser on Biberhaufenweg

Aspern is home to a portion of the Lobau, a floodplain that is part of the Danube-Auen National Park. It also includes sections of the Danube and a stretch of the Donauinsel. The Mühlwasser, an old branch of the Danube, flows through the southern part of the town and provides a popular swimming spot, along with the Aspern Lake in the Seestadt and the Dechant Lake in the Lobau.

Aspern is home to football club SV Aspern, as well as multiple tennis courts and a climbing gym.

The Klinik Donaustadt, Vienna's second biggest hospital, is located in Aspern, opposite a dental clinic.

== Public transport ==
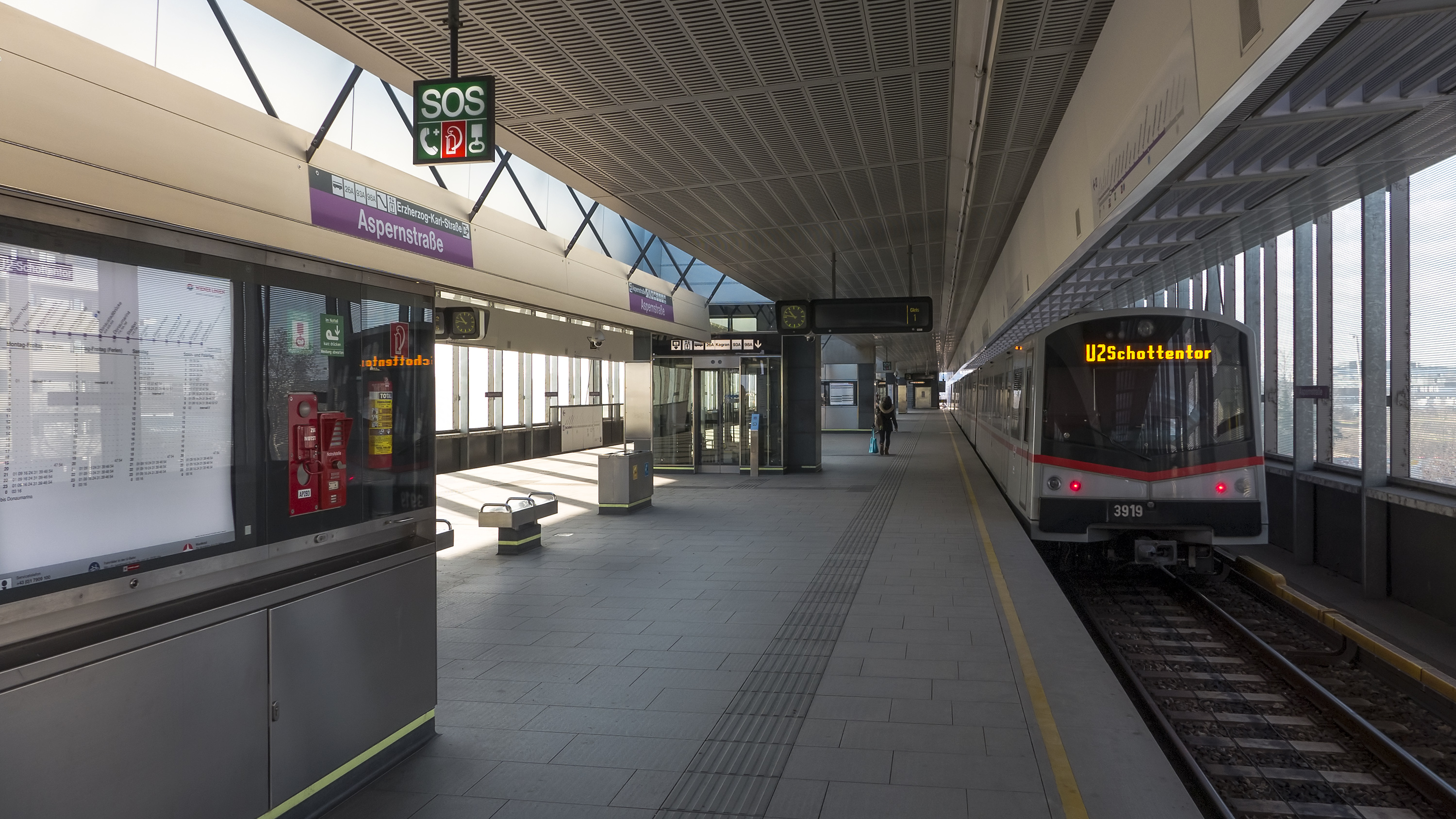
Aspernstraße U-Bahn station

Aspern is home to seven overground metro stations on the U2 line of the Vienna U-Bahn:

- Hardeggasse (on the border of Stadlau)
- Donauspital
- Aspernstraße
- Lina-Loos-Platz
- Hausfeldstraße
- Aspern Nord (on the border of Breitenlee)
- Seestadt

Furthermore, the town offers an array of bus lines, including the 22a, 26a, and 98a routes, as well as the 25 and 26 tram routes.

== Seestadt Aspern ==
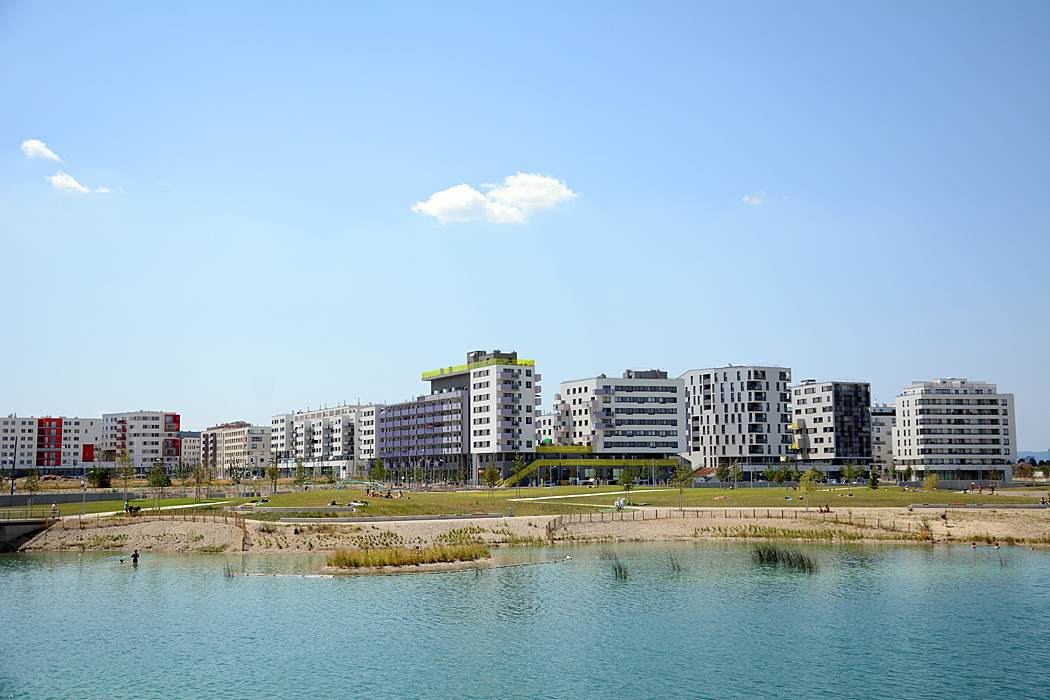
Seestadt Aspern from Aspern Lake

Seestadt Aspern is a quarter under construction within Aspern, on the ground of the former airfield. It is one of the largest ongoing urban development projects in Europe. By completion there are expected to be 25,000 residents and 20,000 jobs in the city. The city is named after the Aspern Lake, a man-made lake dug in its centre.

== Geothermal energy ==
OMV and Wien Energie (de) plan to build up to seven deep geothermal plants in Vienna with a capacity of 200 megawatts. The first drilling operations at the Aspern site were completed in July 2025. They were followed by successful production tests. In total, deep geothermal energy could in future generate sustainable heat for the equivalent of 200,000 households in Vienna. Construction of the plant building is scheduled to begin in early 2027, with operations set to commence in 2029. Around 90 million euros will be invested in the project.

== Notable people ==
- David Alaba, footballer
- Virginia Kirchberger, footballer

== Gallery ==
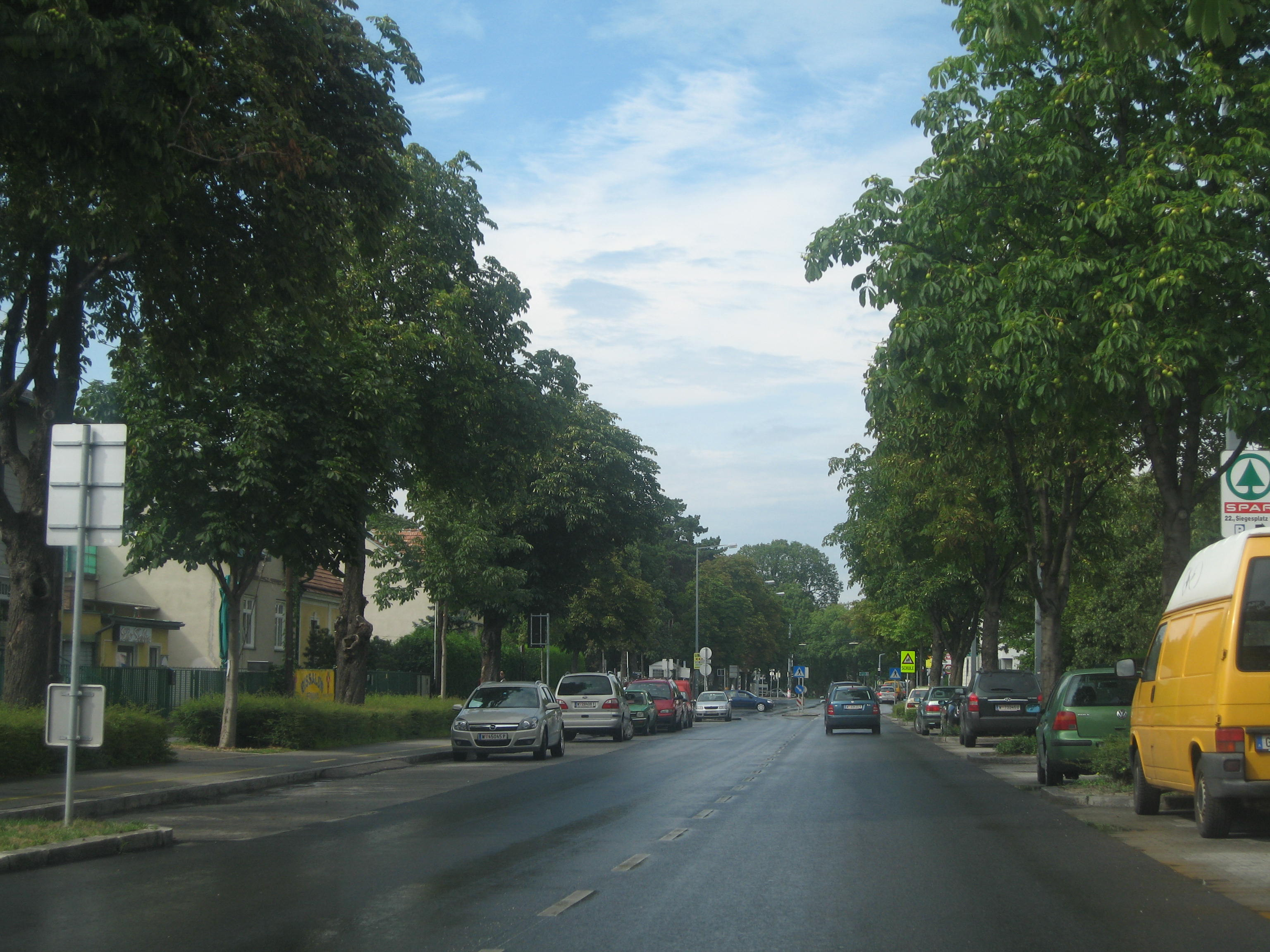
On a road leading to the centre of town

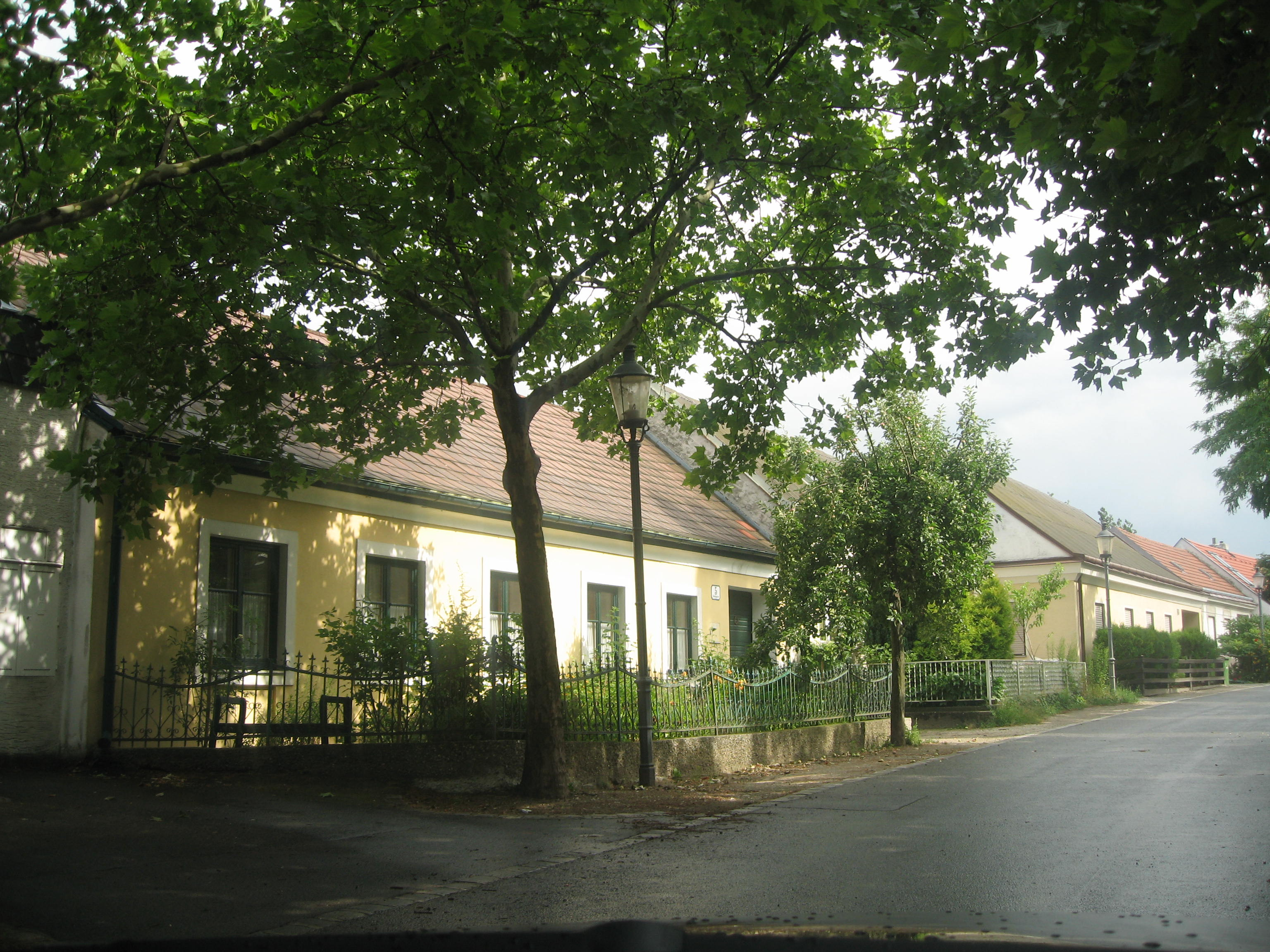
Old houses on Lobaugasse

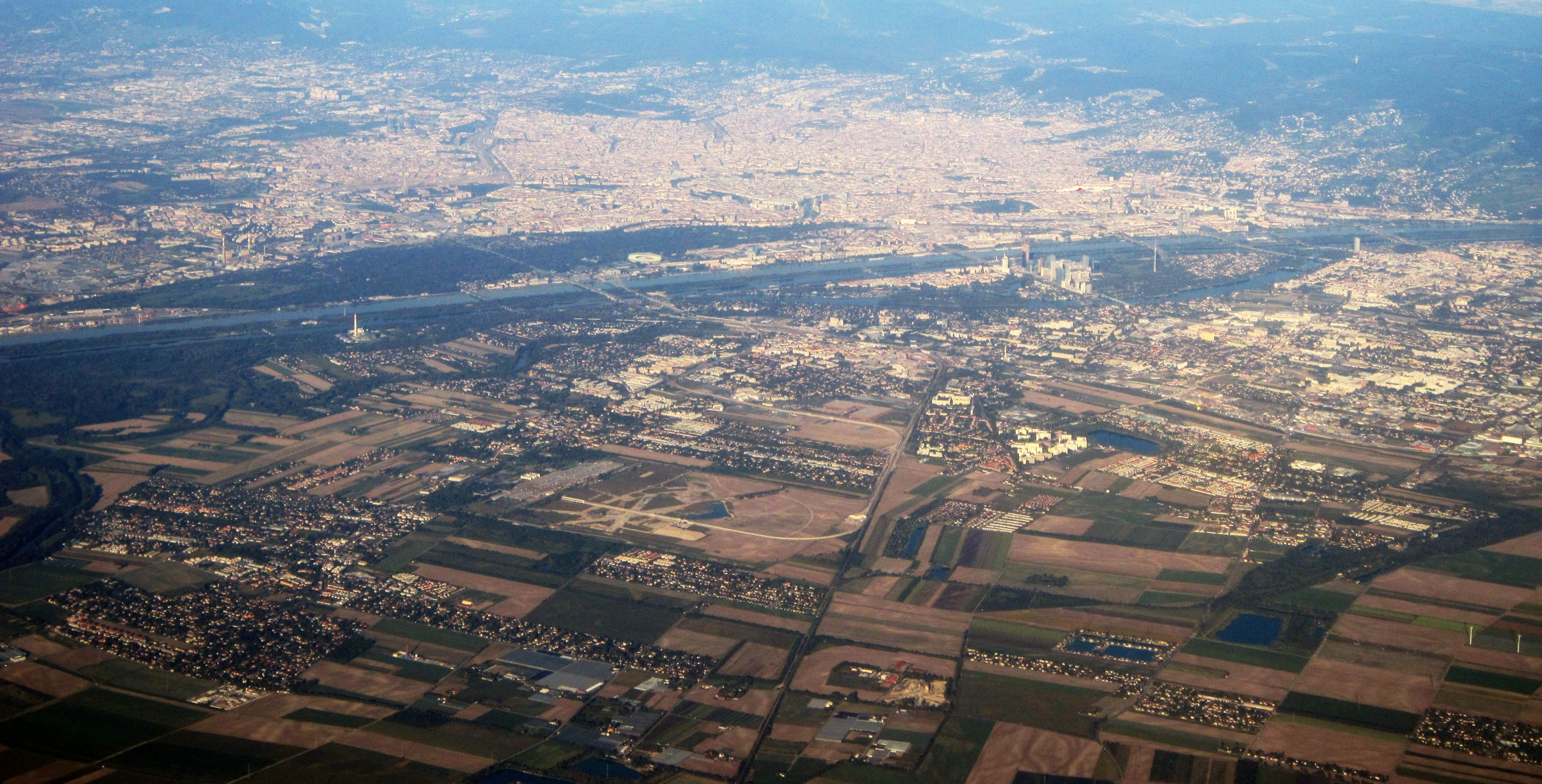
Aspern Airfield, surrounded by Aspern and Essling

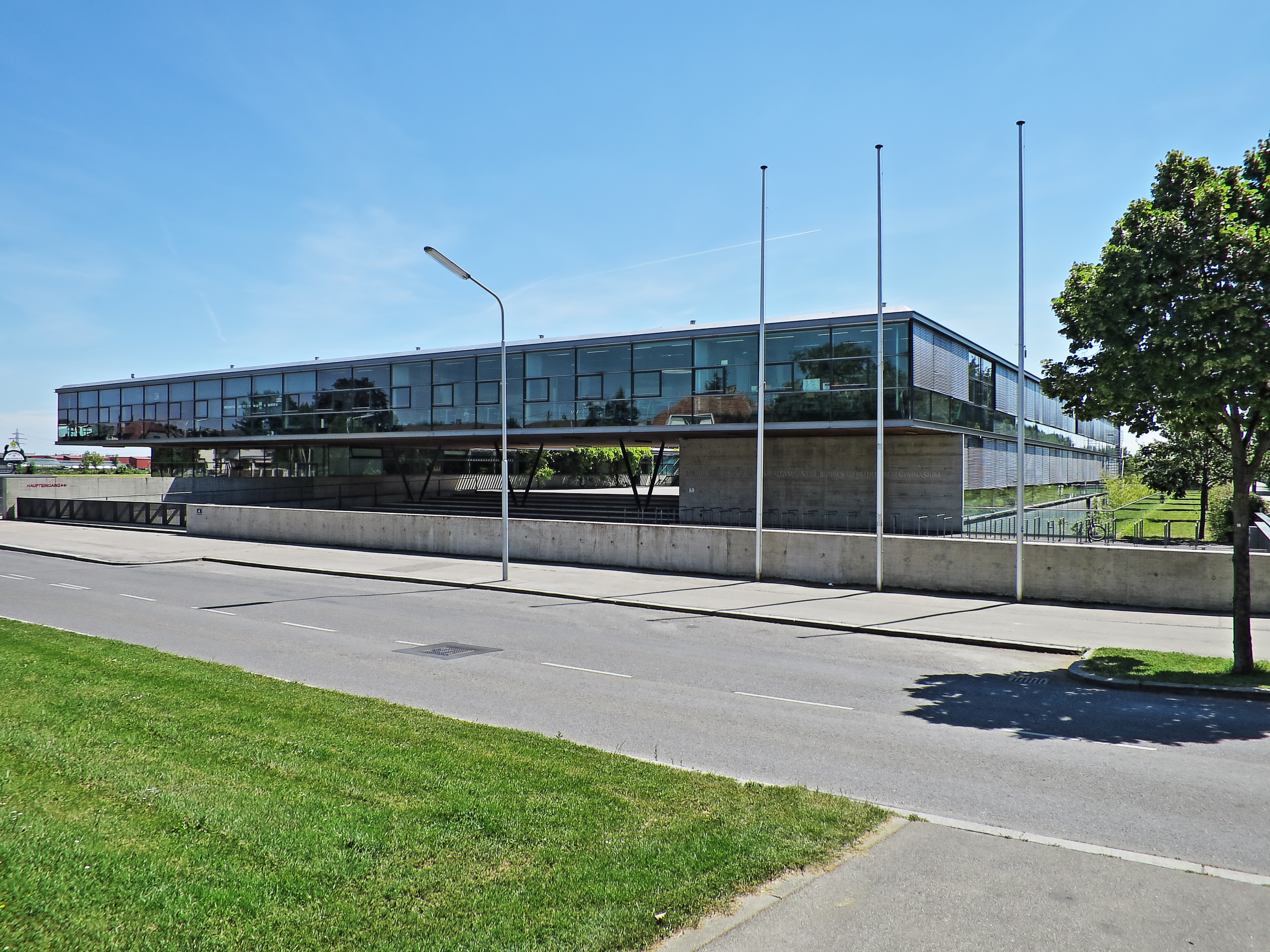
Secondary school AHS Heustadelgasse

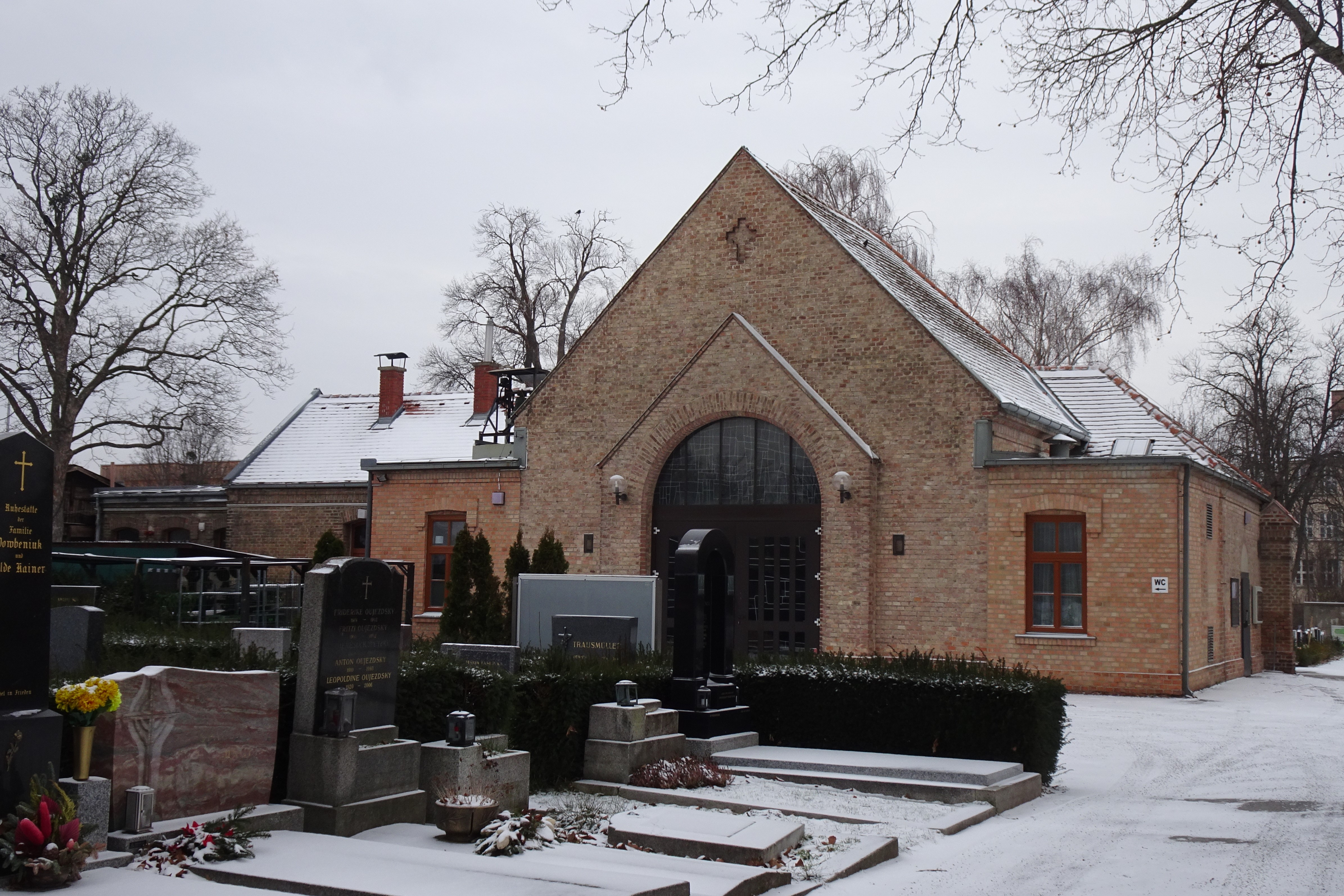
Asperner cemetery
