= Lina-Loos-Platz station =

Railway station in Vienna, Austria

Lina-Loos-Platz
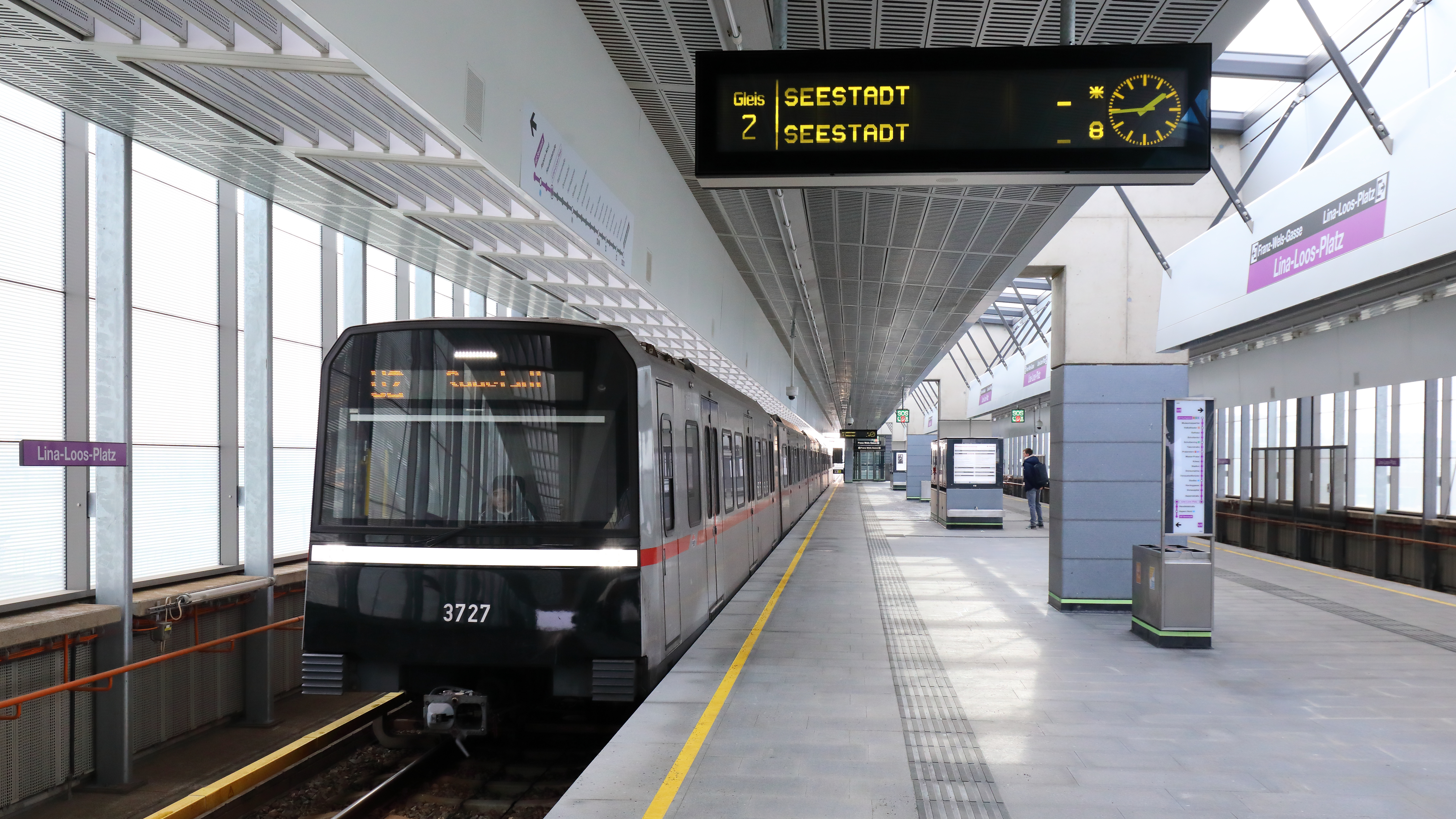

General information
- Location: Donaustadt, Vienna; Austria
- Coordinates: 48.228511°N 16.478661°E

History
- Opened: January 19, 2026

Services
Preceding station	Wiener Linien	Following station
Aspernstraße toward Karlsplatz	U2	Hausfeldstraße toward Seestadt
Location

Lina-Loos-Platz is a station on the U2 line of the Vienna U-Bahn, in Aspern, Donaustadt, Vienna's 22nd district. The station opened on 19 January 2026.

== About ==
The structure was completed in 2013 as part of the extension of the U2 to Seestadt. As there was no demand for the station at that time, it remained closed. The station was originally named An den alten Schanzen, before being renamed Im Oberen Hausfeld, and then finally Lina-Loos-Platz, after the area surrounding the station, which in turn is named after Lina Loos, an Austrian actress.
