= Aspernstraße station =

Vienna U-Bahn station

Aspernstraße
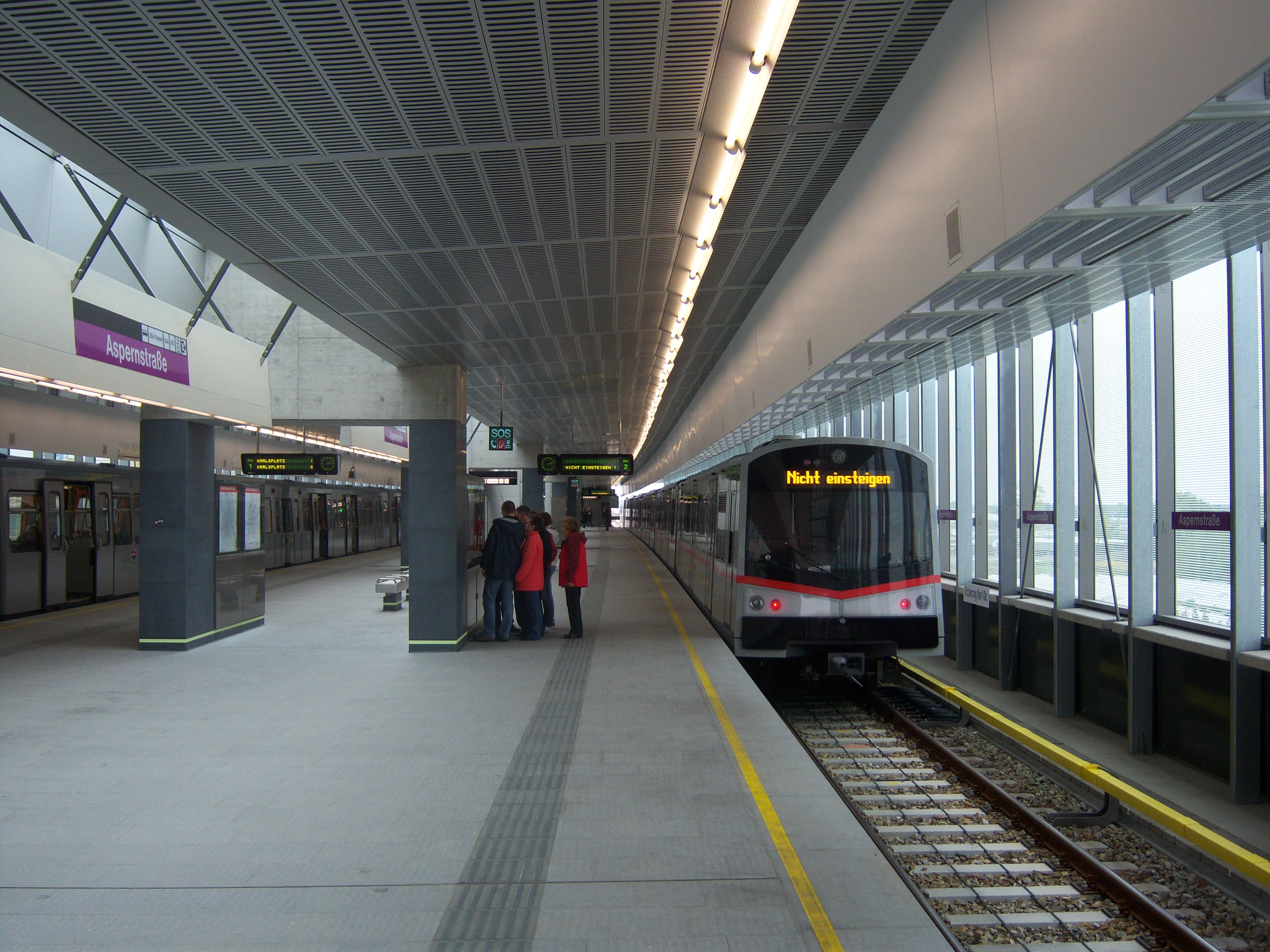

General information
- Location: Donaustadt, Vienna; Austria
- Coordinates: 48.2224°N 16.4748°E
- Platforms: 2
- Bus routes: 22A, 26A, 84A, 93A, 97A, 98A

Construction
- Structure type: elevated

History
- Opened: 2 October 2010

Services
Preceding station	Wiener Linien	Following station
Donauspital toward Karlsplatz	U2	Lina-Loos-Platz toward Seestadt
Location

Aspernstraße is a station on the U2 of the Vienna U-Bahn. It is located in Aspern, Donaustadt, the 22nd district of Vienna. The station was opened on 2 October 2010 as part of the third expansion of the U2 between Stadion and Aspernstraße.

== About ==
The station opened in 2010 after the expansion of the U2 from Stadion in Leopoldau on the western side of the Danube. The tracks cross the river over the Donaustadtbrücke, which was built in 1997 and originally served buses of the Wiener Linien. It was adapted for trains in 2006. Until the expansion of the U2 towards Seestadt in 2013, Aspernstraße was the eastern terminus of the U2. Due relatively low demand from the under-construction Seestadt Aspern, only every second train continues to the end, with the others terminating at Aspernstraße.

The station has two tracks on an island platform, with trains departing towards Karlsplatz in the city centre and Seestadt to the east. To the north of the station, a siding allows trains to terminate and switch directions.

Located in the heart of the Donaustadt on Erzherzog-Karl-Straße, the station serves as a key transport hub in the eastern part of Vienna. In addition to the U2 line, five bus routes - 22A, 84A, 93A, 97A, and 98A - terminate at the station, while the 26A bus passes through, connecting Kagran and Groß-Enzersdorf.

The Wonkaplatz, the square around the station, named after former union leader Richard Wonka in 2010, was redeveloped in the late 2010s, and now features Hofer and Billa supermarkets, a post office, a kebab shop, multiple restaurants, and seating possibilities.

== Gallery ==
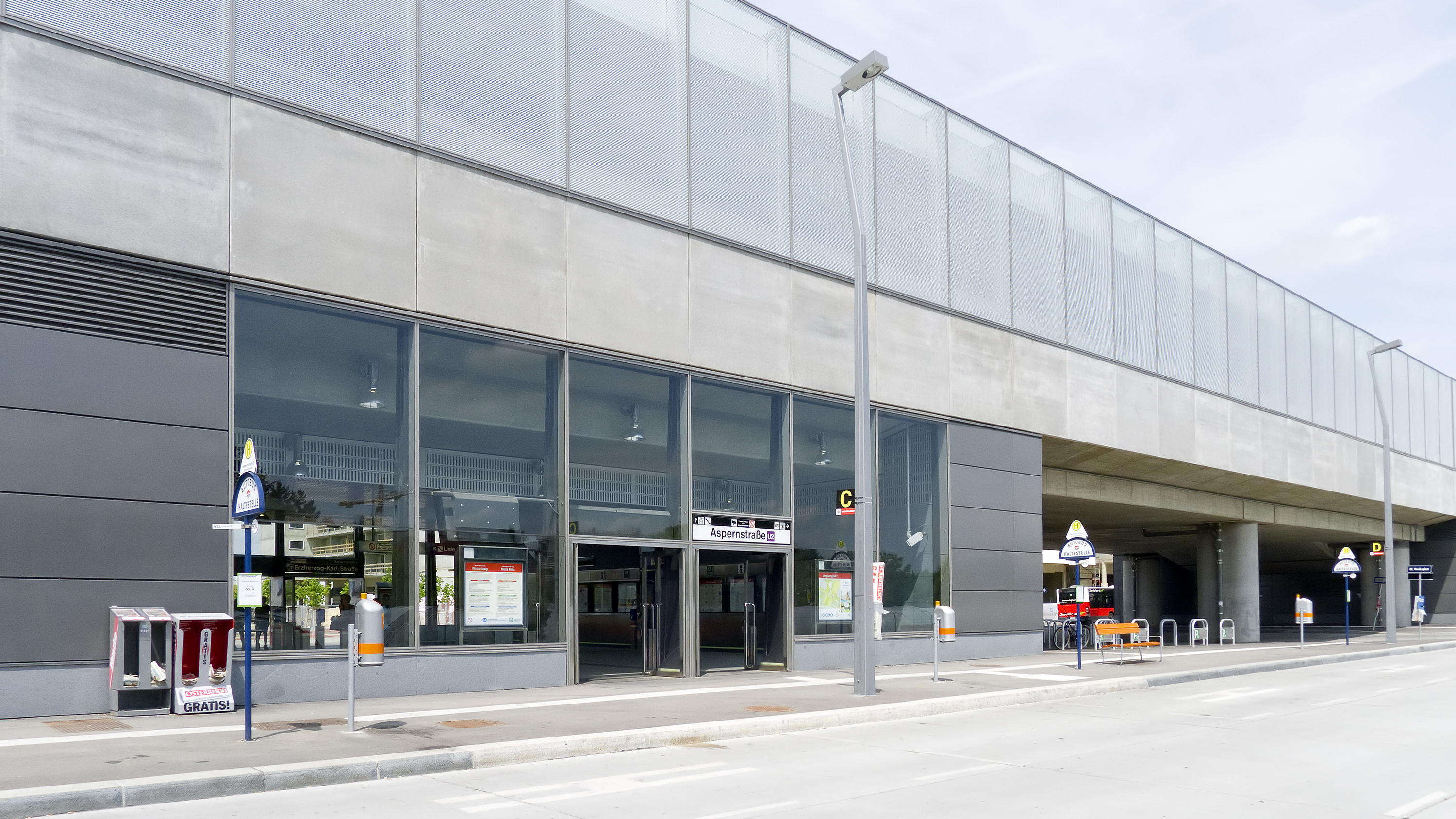
Entrance to the station from Wonkaplatz

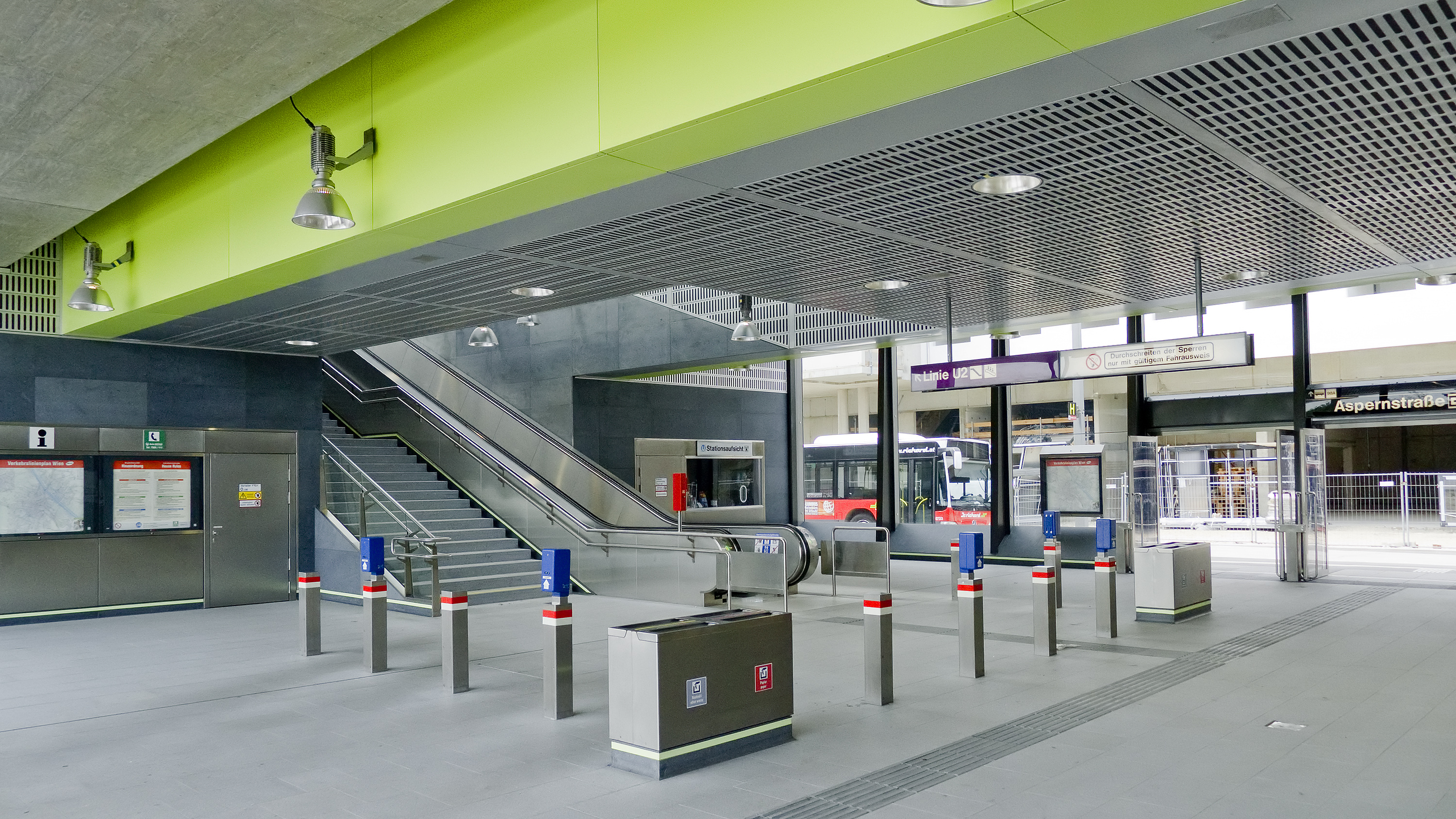
Eastern entrance

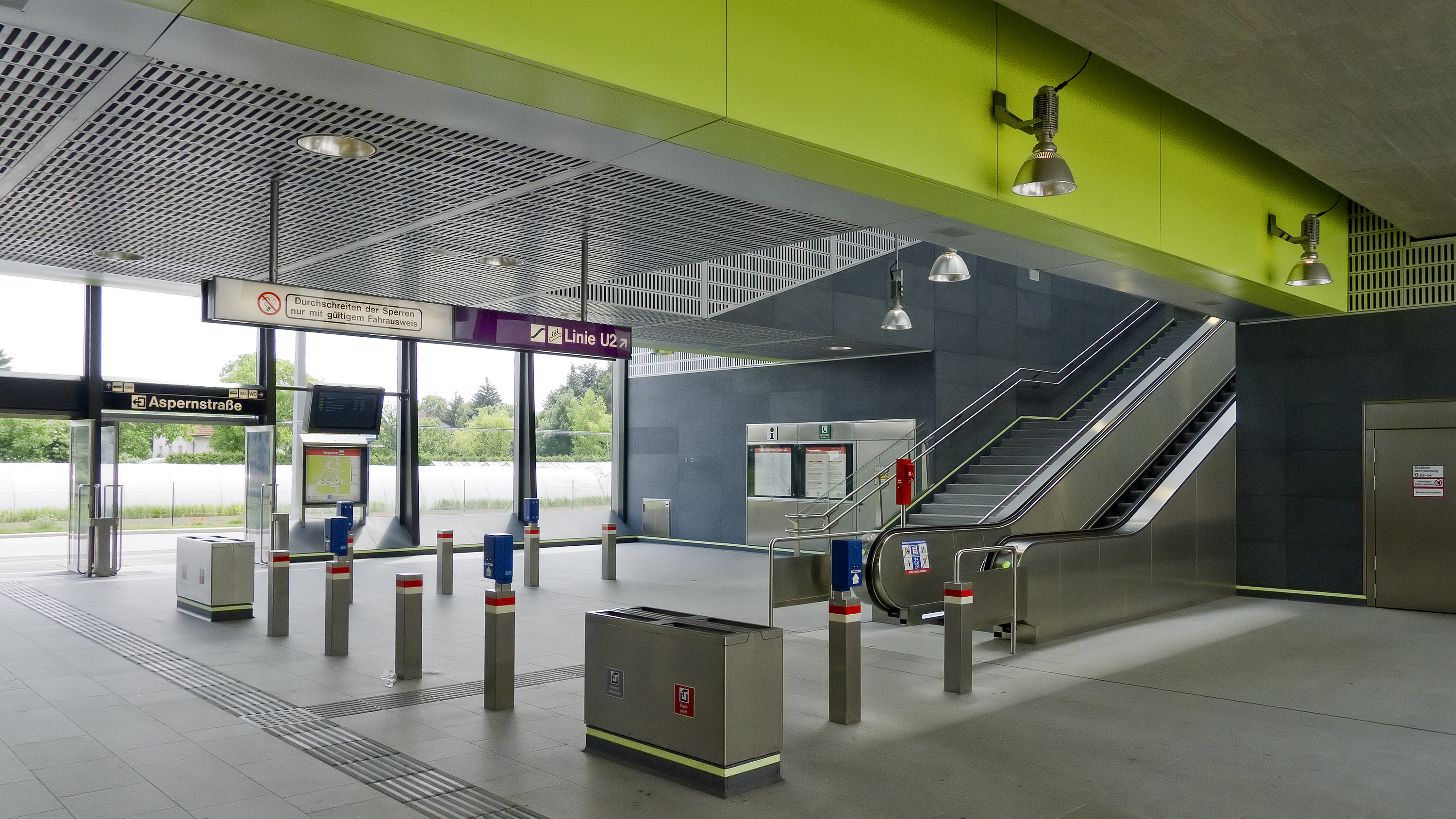
Western entrance

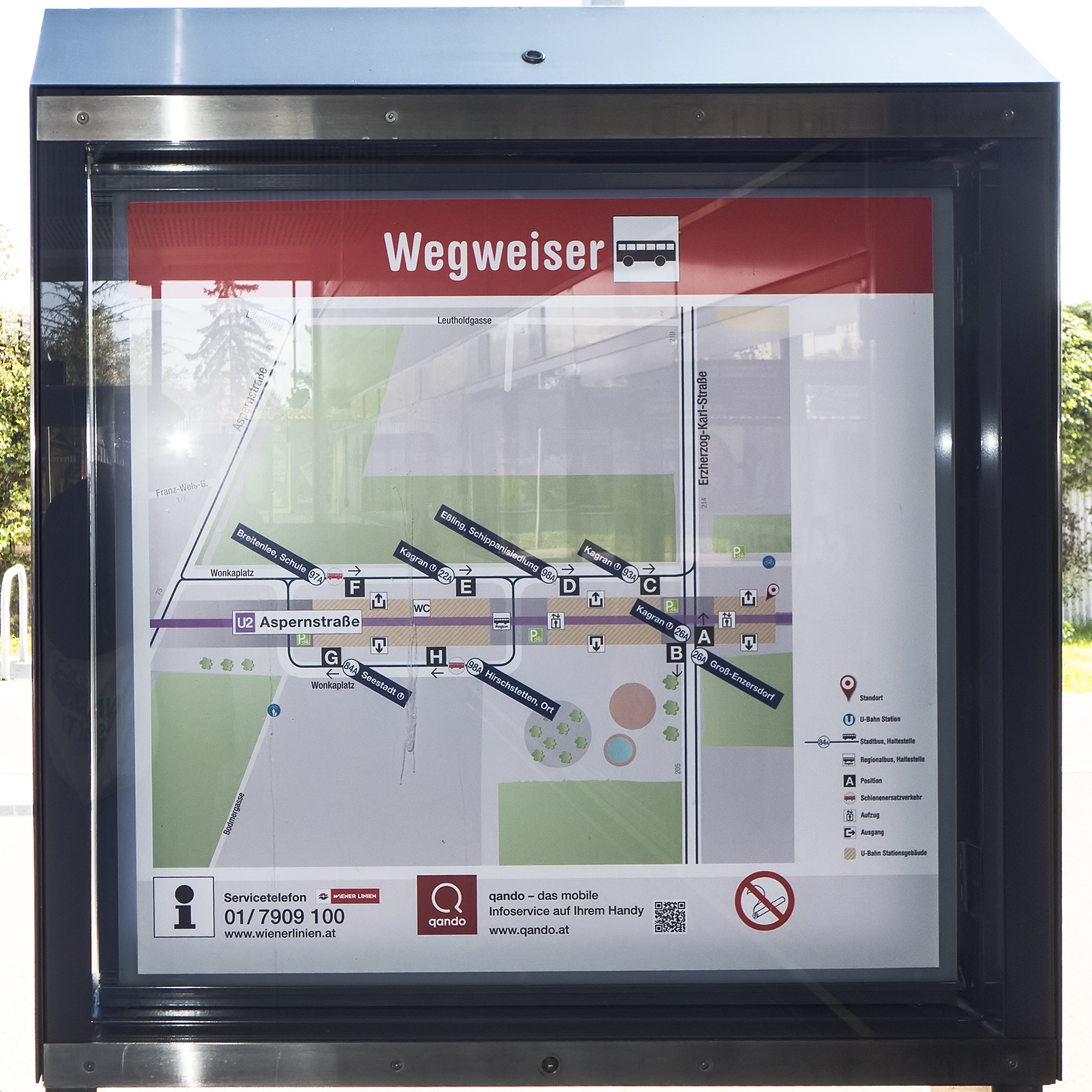
Map of the area
