= U2 (Vienna U-Bahn) =

Metro line in Vienna

Line U2 U-Bahn-Linie U2
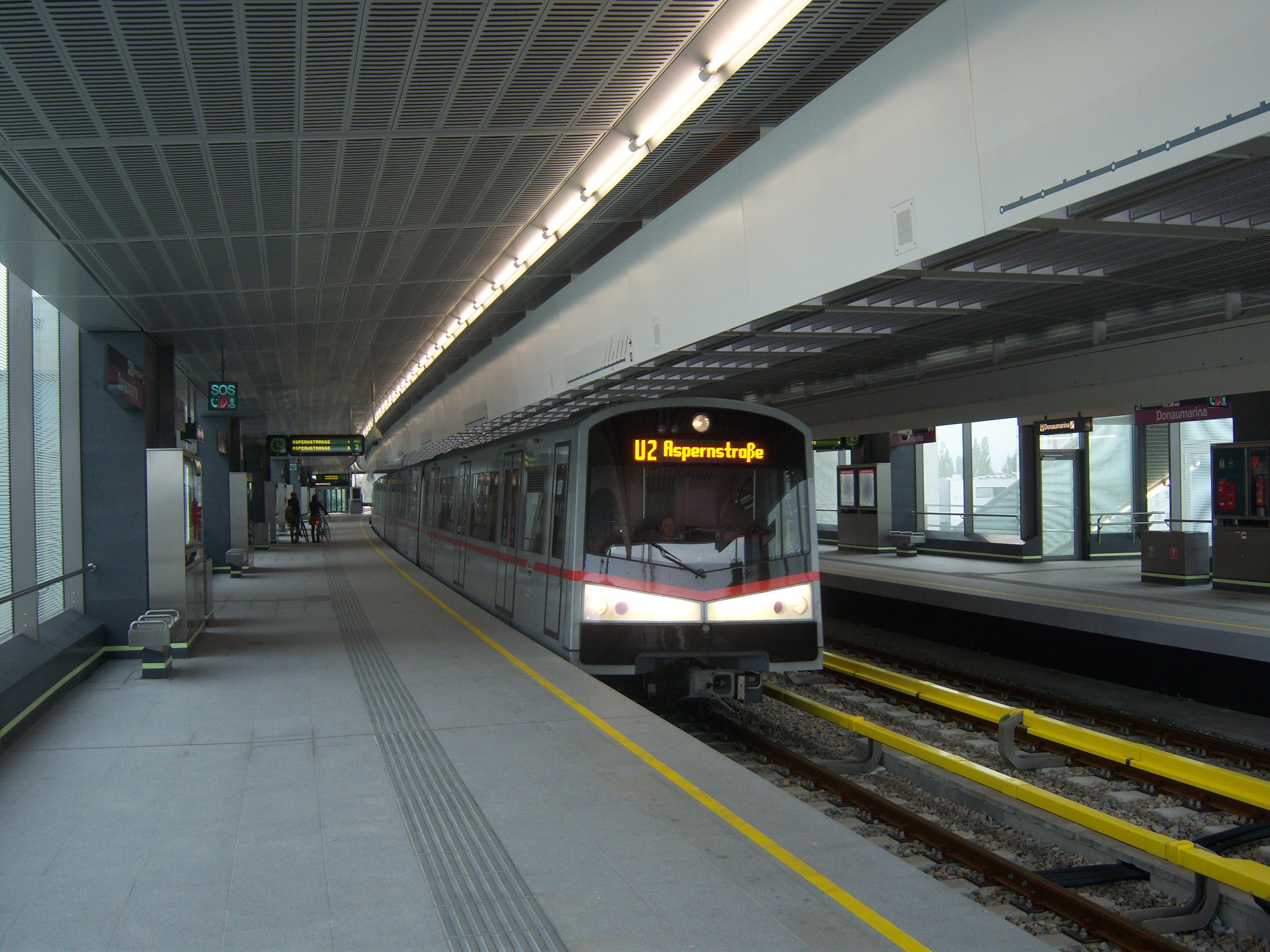
- Line U2 train at Donaumarina

Overview
- Status: Operational
- Termini: Karlsplatz; Seestadt
- Stations: 21

Service
- Type: Rapid transit
- System: Vienna U-Bahn
- Operator(s): Wiener Linien
- Depot(s): Erdberg, Seestadt

History
- Opened: 30 August 1980; 45 years ago
- Last extension: 2013

Technical
- Line length: 17.2 km (10.7 mi)
- Track gauge: 1,435 mm (4 ft 8 1/2 in) standard gauge
- Electrification: 750 V DC third rail

Line U2 is a line on the Vienna U-Bahn metro system. Opened in 1980, it currently has 21 stations and a total length of 17.2 km (10.7 mi), from Karlsplatz to Seestadt. It is connected to U1, U3, and U4.

== Stations ==
Line U2 serves the following stations:

- Karlsplatz (transfer to:)
- Museumsquartier
- Volkstheater (transfer to:)
- Rathaus
- Schottentor
- Schottenring (transfer to:)
- Taborstraße
- Praterstern (transfer to:)
- Messe-Prater
- Krieau
- Stadion
- Donaumarina
- Donaustadtbrücke ( P+R park & ride facility)
- Stadlau (transfer to:)
- Hardeggasse
- Donauspital
- Aspernstraße
- Lina-Loos-Platz
- Hausfeldstraße
- Aspern Nord (transfer to:)
- Seestadt

== History ==
=== Construction (1963–1980) ===
The construction of the tunnel, which was later the centrepiece of the U2, was started in 1963. After the tunnel was completed in 1966 with a length of 1.8 kilometres, it ran from Vienna Secession to Friedrich-Schmidt-Platz. Soon after, the modern construction of Vienna's railway was built on the 3 November 1969. This consisted of the newly built U1 line, and two merged lines from a tram and old metro, of the line U2 and U4 respectively. As the result of a more streamlined network, there were new routes between U1, U2 and U4.

In the 1960s and 1970s, U2 received a total of three new stations: Karlsplatz, Schottentor and Schottenring. On 30 August 1980, the U2 between Karlsplatz and Schottenring was opened, meaning the line was 3.5 kilometres in length.

=== Expansion (2008–2013) ===
Between 1980 and 2008, the U2 remained by far the weakest busy line in the Vienna network. As a result, U2 was extended to the Ernst Happel Stadium in 2008, to Aspernstraße in 2010, and finally to Seestadt on October 5, 2013.

=== Future ===
It has been proposed that the existing U2 line will be separated into two lines at Rathaus station. The section of the current U2 line from Rathaus to Karlsplatz will be upgraded to allow for driverless operation and become part of a new U5 line. A new U2 line will then be built, extending from Rathaus to Wien Matzleinsdorfer Platz railway station (for interchange with the Vienna S-Bahn), via interchanges with the U3 at Neubaugasse and the U4 at Pilgramgasse, and then on to Wienerberg. In late 2017 it was announced that construction on the new line would start in 2018, with entry into service planned for 2030.

== Rolling stock ==
The development of the cars of the Type U2 trains was by Simmering-Graz-Pauker (SGP) in 1972. This unit had a two-axle motorcar, it was 36.8 metres long and 2.8 metres wide and a permanently coupled twin railcar. A train was made up of three double cars. From 1987, SGP upgraded their cars' technical equipment, which included water-cooled three-phase motors, brakes with energy recovery and modernised emergency braking and safety equipment. In 2006, the U2 LED displays replaced the original in-and-out illuminated telltale displays. In addition, the trains were retrofitted with plastic seats, video surveillance and warning lights that had signalled the door closing. An individual car consists of 49 seats and 91 standing spots.

The line, as of 2025, operates with the newer Type V and Type X. Since 6th of December 2024 the Type U2 has stopped its operation as the newly built Safety Doors from Karlsplatz to Rathaus do not react with them. They are now mainly serving (as of June 2025) at the U3.

== Service ==
Time	Mon–Fri (School)	Mon–Fri (Holidays)	Saturday	Sunday and Public Holidays
04:30 to 07:00	3–5 minutes	4–5 minutes	7 minutes	7 minutes
07:00 to 20:00	3–5 minutes	4–5 minutes	5 minutes	5 minutes
20:00 to 00:00	8 minutes	8 minutes	8 minutes	8 minutes
00:00 to 04:30	No service	No service	15 minutes	15 minutes

In rush hour and during the night, the entire line is serviced by all trains; during all other operating hours, every second train terminates at Aspernstraße due to lower capacity utilization on the final section.
