= Karlsplatz station (Vienna U-Bahn) =

Metro station in Vienna, Austria

Karlsplatz
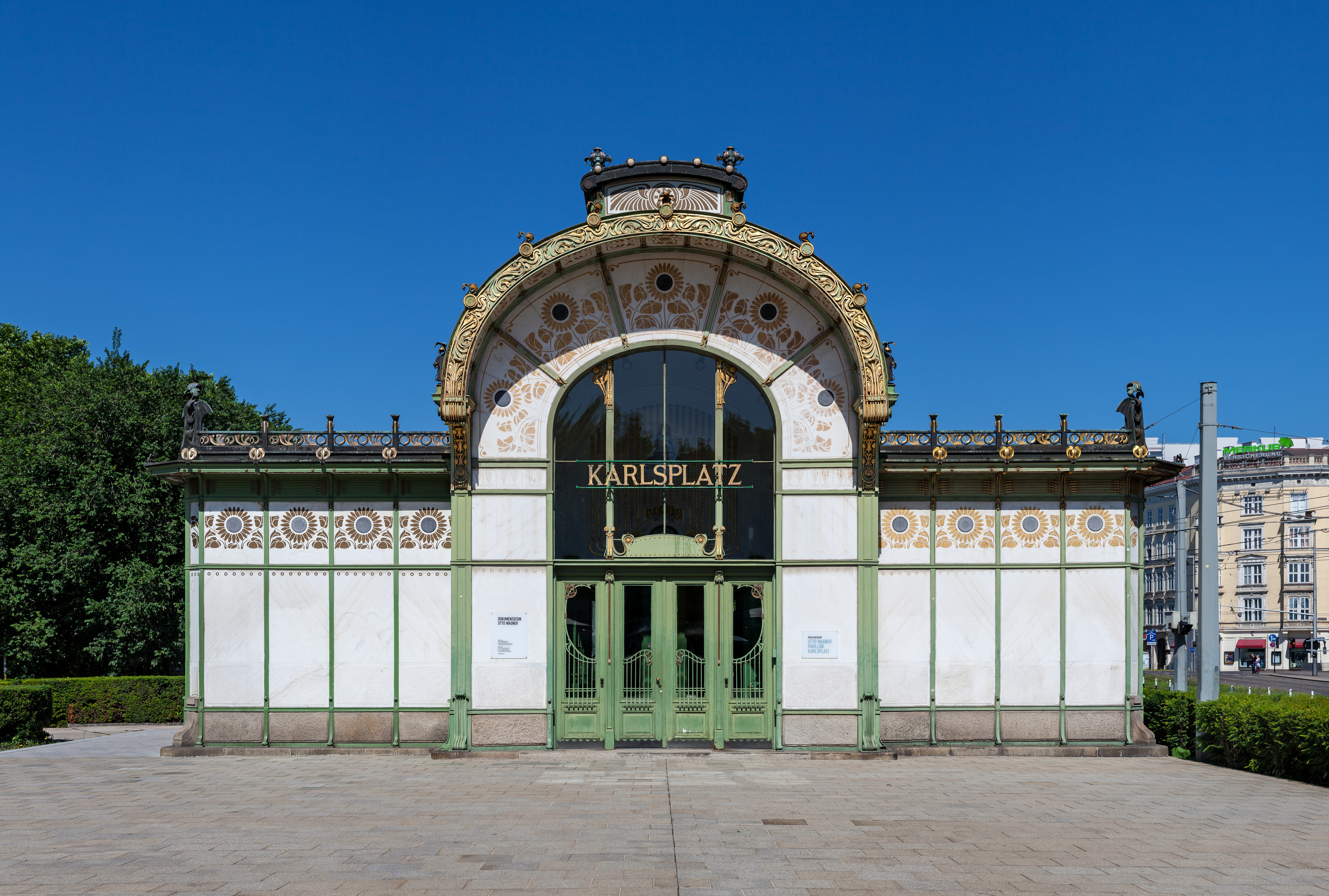
- Old Karlsplatz metro station

General information
- Location: Innere Stadt, Vienna; Austria
- Coordinates: 48.2007°N 16.3689°E
- Tracks: 6

History
- Opened: 25 February 1978

Services
Preceding station	Wiener Linien	Following station
Taubstummengasse toward Oberlaa	U1	Stephansplatz toward Leopoldau
Terminus	U2	Museumsquartier toward Seestadt
Kettenbrückengasse toward Hütteldorf	U4	Stadtpark toward Heiligenstadt
Location

Karlsplatz is a station on U1, U2 and U4 of the Vienna U-Bahn. It is located in the Innere Stadt district. It first opened on June 30, 1899, as the Academiestrasse station of the Wiener Stadtbahn, and received its current name in the same year that the associated square was named after Karl VI. At the same time, the company abbreviation changed from AK to KP. After the cessation of steam operation in 1918, the Wiener Elektrische Stadtbahn operated as a replacement from 1925. Upon the commissioning of the first subway section of the U1 from Reumannplatz on February 25, 1978, Karlsplatz also became an underground station and, after the platforms on Line U4 opened in 1980, is now the largest transport hub for Wiener Linien.

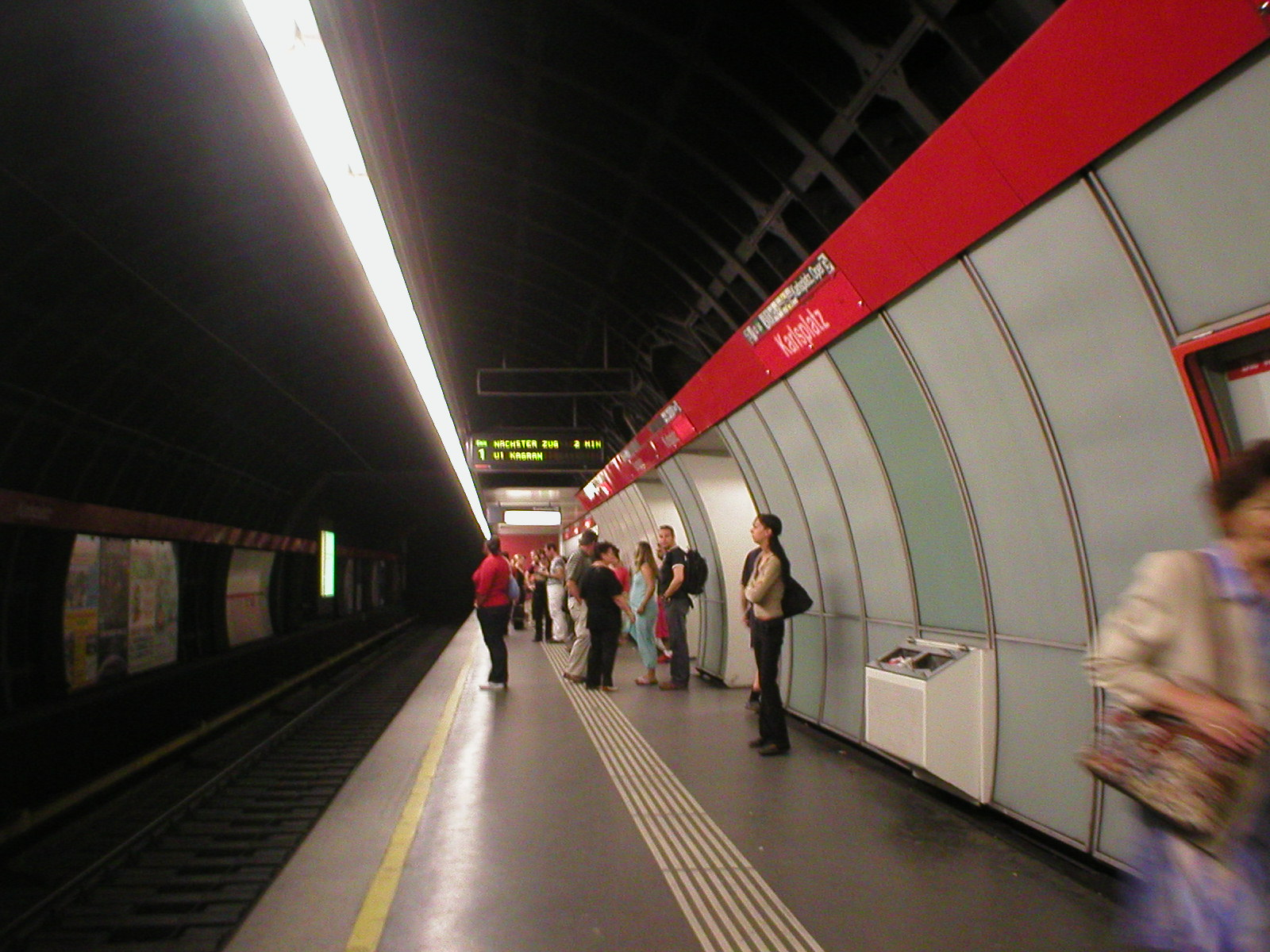
U1 platform

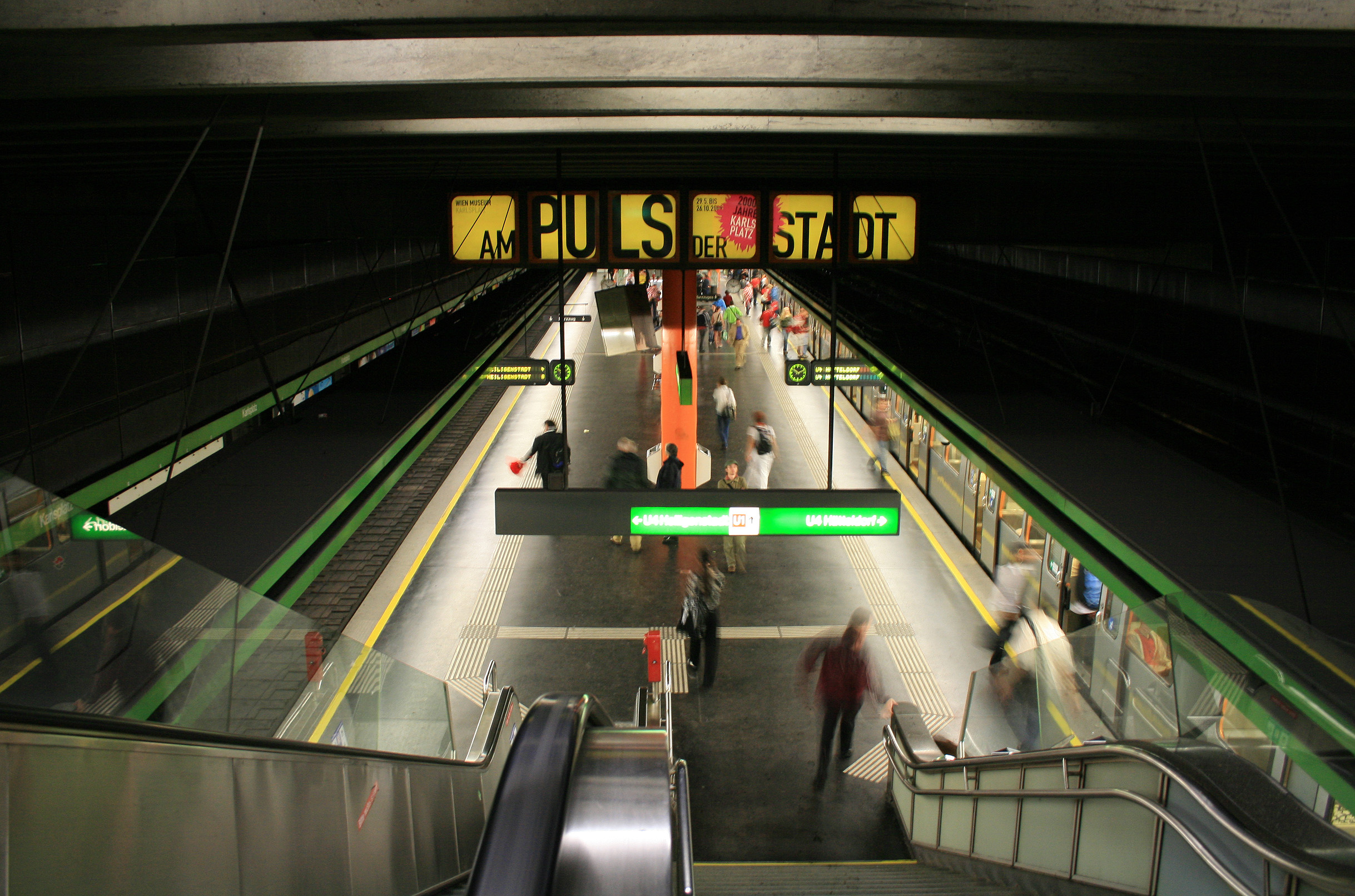
U4 platform

== Location ==
The station is located in the city center and is surrounded by many important buildings and other landmarks: The exit via Opernpassage leads to the main building of the Vienna University of Technology, Resselpark and the Karlskirche, while the Northern exit leads to Vienna State Opera, and the entrance to the pedestrian zone Kärtner Straße. This area has many luxury hotels. Via the underground pathways you can also reach Secession Building, Naschmarkt, Vianna Künstlerhaus and Wiener Musikverein easily by foot.

== History ==
=== Stadtbahn ===
In the early railway project plan from 1890, the station can be found under the name Schwarzenbergbrücke (Bridge of Schwarzenberg). But because this bridge was already deconstructed in 1895, the name Technik was then agreed upon in 1896, referring to the nearby TU Wien. On opening day the name ended up being Akademiestraße. The architecture of the station, which was constructed under the Commission für Verkehrsanlagen in Wien and completed in March of 1898, was unique for the railway network: On the overground there are two pavillons, decorated with ornaments.

== Art ==
The following art is found in the station.

- "Pi" by Ken Lum.
- Rauminstallation by Peter Kogler
- Fries "Unisono di colori" by Ernst Friedrich and Eleonor Friedrich

== See also ==
- Karlsplatz Stadtbahn Station
