= Kurt Sochatzy =

Luftwaffe fighter ace and Knight's Cross recipient (1915–1996)

- Sochatzy as an Oberleutnant
- Born: 5 February 1915; Schloß Pragerhof, Austria-Hungary
- Died: 2 May 1996 (aged 81); Vienna, Austria
- Military career
- Allegiance: (Austria) First Austrian Republic (to 1938); Nazi Germany (to 1945) (Austria) Second Austrian Republic
- Branch: Austrian Air Force (1935–38); Luftwaffe (1938–45); Austrian Air Force (1956–76)
- Service years: 1934–1940; 1956–1976
- Rank: Oberleutnant (Wehrmacht); Oberst (Bundesheer)
- Units: Condor Legion; JG 3
- Conflicts: Spanish Civil War; World War II: Eastern Front
- Awards: Knight's Cross of the Iron Cross

Kurt Sochatzy (5 February 1915 – 2 May 1996) was a Luftwaffe ace and recipient of the Knight's Cross of the Iron Cross during World War II. The Knight's Cross of the Iron Cross, and its variants were the highest awards in the military and paramilitary forces of Nazi Germany during World War II - for the fighter pilots, it was a quantifiable measure of skill and success. On 3 August 1941 Kurt Sochatzy was shotdown in his Bf 109 and was captured by Soviet troops. He was held as a prisoner of war until 1947. During his career he was credited with 38 aerial victories.

== Early life and career ==
Sochatzy was born on 5 February 1915 in Schloß Pragerhof then in Lower Styria within Austria-Hungary, now Pragersko in northeastern Slovenia. He was the son of an Imperial and Royal officer. In 1934, Sochatzy joined the military service, initially serving with Dragoner-Regiment Nr. 2 "Feldmarschall Montecuccoli" in Enns. In 1935, he transferred to the Austrian Air Force (Luftstreitkräfte) and was trained as a fighter pilot. Following the Anschluss in March 1938, the forced incorporation of Austria into Nazi Germany, Sochatzy was transferred to the Luftwaffe (the Nazi German Air Force) holding the rank of Leutnant (second lieutenant).

On 1 April, a newly formed I. Gruppe (1st group) of Jagdgeschwader 138 (JG 138—138th Fighter Wing) stationed in Wien-Aspern also referred to as the "Wiener-Jagdgruppe" ("Vienna fighter group") was created, largely staffed with former Austrian Air Force personnel. On 1 May 1939, I. Gruppe of JG 138 was re-designated and became I. Gruppe of Jagdgeschwader 76 (JG 76—76th Fighter Wing). Initially equipped with the Fiat CR.32, 3. Staffel received the Messerschmitt Bf 109 B. The Gruppe was reequipped with the Bf 109 E-1 and E-3 in 1939. Sochatzy, who had served with this unit since July 1938, volunteered for service in the Condor Legion during the Spanish Civil War. In Spain, he flew with 3. Staffel (3rd squadron) of Jagdgruppe 88 (J/88–88th Fighter Group). In July 1939, Sochatzy returned from Spain and was again assigned to I. Gruppe of JG 76. For his service in the Spanish Civil War, he was the Spanish Cross in Bronze with Swords (Spanienkreuz in Bronze mit Schwertern).

== World War II ==
World War II in Europe began on Friday 1 September 1939 when German forces invaded Poland. In preparation of the invasion, I. Gruppe of JG 76 had been moved to an airfield at Stubendorf, present-day Izbicko in Poland, on 17 August 1939 and supported the German advance on the central and southern sectors of the front. During the invasion, Sochatzy flew multiple close air support missions and was awarded the Iron Cross 2nd Class (Eisernes Kreuz zweiter Klasse).

Promoted to Oberleutnant (first lieutenant), Sochatzy was transferred to the fighter pilot training unit Jagdfliegerschule 5 (JFS 5—5th Fighter Pilot School) at Wien-Schwechat in January 1940. Initially serving as adjutant to the school's commander Eduard Ritter von Schleich, he was later appointed Staffelkapitän (squadron leader) of 3. Staffel (3rd squadron) of JFS 5. Among his students were the fighter pilots Hans-Joachim Marseille, Walter Nowotny and Hans Strelow.

=== Squadron leader ===
On 15 December 1940 during the Battle of Britain, Sochatzy was appointed Staffelkapitän of 7. Staffel of Jagdgeschwader 3 (JG 3—3rd Fighter Wing). He succeeded Oberleutnant Erwin Neuerburg. The Staffel was subordinated to III. Gruppe (3rd group) of JG 3 and at the time under command of Hauptmann Walter Oesau and based at Desvres near the English Channel. Sochatzy claimed his first victory on 7 June 1941, a Supermarine Spitfire fighter from No. 603 Squadron of the Royal Auxiliary Air Force.

=== War against the Soviet Union ===
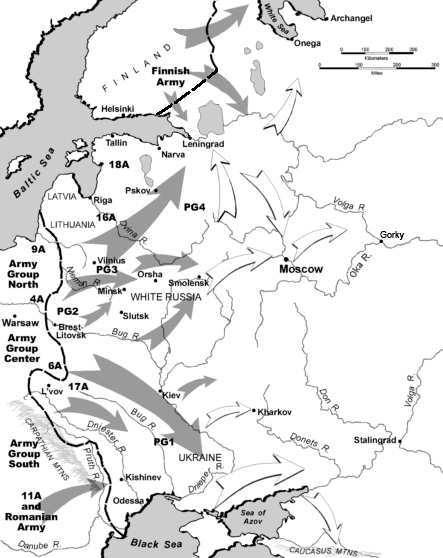
Map indicating Operation Barbarossa's attack plan

The Gruppe relocated to an airfield at Moderówka on 18 June where the Gruppe concluded their last preparations for Operation Barbarossa, the German invasion of the Soviet Union on 22 June 1941. At the start of the campaign, JG 3 was subordinated to the V. Fliegerkorps (5th Air Corps), under command of General der Flieger Robert Ritter von Greim, which was part of Luftflotte 4 (4th Air Fleet), under command of Generaloberst Alexander Löhr. These air elements supported Generalfeldmarschall Gerd von Rundstedt's Heeresgruppe Süd (Army Group South), with the objective of capturing Ukraine and its capital Kiev.

Operation from Hostynne on 26 June, III. Gruppe intercepted a formation Tupolev SB bombers, sometimes referred to as "Martin bombers" by the Germans, northwest of Berestechko. During this encounter, Sochatzy claimed one of the bombers shot down. On 6 July, III. Gruppe moved to Polonne, located approximately 80 kilometers (50 miles) west-southwest of Zhytomyr, where they stayed until 21 July. Here on 9 July, Sochatzy became an "ace-in-a-day" for the first time, claiming three SB-2 bombers and two Petlyakov Pe-2 bombers.

On 16 July during the Battle of Uman, Sochatzy claimed two SB-3 bombers shot down. His Bf 109 F-2 (Werknummer 9612—factory number) was damaged in the encounter, resulting in an emergency landing behind enemy lines. Initially reported as missing in action, he later returned to his unit unharmed. The Gruppe moved to Bila Tserkva on 22 July, the next day flew multiple missions over the Dnieper. During the course of these missions, Sochatzy claimed five Ilyushin DB-3 bombers, making him an "ace-in-a-day" for the second time.

On 3 August during the Battle of Kiev, Sochatzy collided with a Polikarpov I-16 fighter in aerial combat. He managed to bail out from his Bf 109 F-2 (Werknummer 8217—factory number) near Kiev becoming a prisoner of war. (Note: According to Scutts, Sochatzy was shot down in aerial combat with Ilyushin Il-2 attack aircraft.) Consequently, he was succeeded by Oberleutnant Hans Ohly as commander of 7. Staffel. In recognition for his 38 aerial victories claimed, Sochatzy was awarded the Knight's Cross of the Iron Cross (Ritterkreuz des Eisernen Kreuzes) on 12 August 1941. Sochatzy had flown 120 combat missions since 22 June. In addition to his aerial victories claimed, he was credited with the destruction of 20 aircraft on the ground, making him one of the most successful pilots of III. Gruppe at the time.

== Later life ==
Sochatzy was released from Soviet captivity in 1947. He then worked for the Kraftwerksgruppe Kaprun, a hydropower provider. In 1956, he joined the Austrian Air Force, referred to as the Österreichische Luftstreitkräfte, initially holding the rank of Hauptmann. Serving until 1976, he retired with the rank of Oberst (Colonel) in 1976. He died on 2 May 1996 at the age of 81 in Vienna, Austria.

== Summary of career ==
=== Aerial victory claims ===
According to Obermaier, Sochatzy was credited with 38 aerial victories claimed in 180 missions. He also destroyed 2 trains and 27 aircraft on the ground in strafing attacks. Matthews and Foreman, authors of Luftwaffe Aces — Biographies and Victory Claims, researched the German Federal Archives and found records for 38 aerial victory claims on the Eastern Front and one unconfirmed claim on the Western Front.

Chronicle of aerial victories
This and the ♠ (Ace of spades) indicates those aerial victories which made Sochatzy an "ace-in-a-day", a term which designates a fighter pilot who has shot down five or more airplanes in a single day. This and the – (dash) indicates unconfirmed aerial victory claims for which Sochatzy did not receive credit.
| Claim | Date | Time | Type | Location | Claim | Date | Time | Type | Location |
– 7. Staffel of Jagdgeschwader 51 – At the Channel and over England — 15 December 1940 – 9 June 1941
| — | 7 June 1941 | — | Spitfire | Cap Gris-Nez | | | | | |
– 7. Staffel of Jagdgeschwader 51 – Operation Barbarossa — 22 June – 3 August 1941
| 1 | 26 June 1941 | 09:16 | SB-2 | | 20 | 12 July 1941 | 11:03 | I-16 | |
| 2 | 26 June 1941 | 15:50 | Potez 63 | | 21 | 13 July 1941 | 10:10 | SB-2 | |
| 3 | 30 June 1941 | 08:07 | Potez 63 | | 22 | 13 July 1941 | 10:25 | SB-2 | |
| 4 | 30 June 1941 | 08:10 | Potez 63 | | 23 | 14 July 1941 | 07:08 | I-153 | |
| 5 | 30 June 1941 | 14:08 | unknown | | 24 | 15 July 1941 | 19:10 | I-16 | |
| 6 | 1 July 1941 | 10:23 | I-153 | | 25 | 16 July 1941 | 15:23 | SB-3 | |
| 7 | 1 July 1941 | 15:50 | SB-2 | | 26 | 16 July 1941 | 15:25 | SB-3 | |
| 8 | 6 July 1941 | 17:10 | SB-2 | | 27♠ | 23 July 1941 | 13:41 | DB-3 | |
| 9 | 6 July 1941 | 17:15 | SB-2 | | 28♠ (Note: This claim is not listed by Mathews and Foreman.) | 23 July 1941 | 13:43 | DB-3 | |
| 10 | 6 July 1941 | 17:20 | Pe-2 | | 29♠ | 23 July 1941 | 13:45 | DB-3 | |
| 11 | 7 July 1941 | 08:15 | V-11 (Il-2) | | 30♠ | 23 July 1941 | 17:22 | DB-3 | |
| 12 | 7 July 1941 | 08:17 | V-11 (Il-2) | | 31♠ | 23 July 1941 | 17:25 | DB-3 | |
| 13♠ | 9 July 1941 | 15:55 | Pe-2 | | 32 | 24 July 1941 | 14:02 | DB-3 | |
| 14♠ | 9 July 1941 | 16:01 | Pe-2 | | 33 | 24 July 1941 | 14:04 | DB-3 | |
| 15♠ | 9 July 1941 | 17:20 | SB-2 | | 34 | 25 July 1941 | 18:52 | SB-3 | |
| 16♠ | 9 July 1941 | 17:23 | SB-2 | | 35 | 25 July 1941 | 18:57 | SB-3 | |
| 17♠ | 9 July 1941 | 17:27 | SB-2 | | 36 | 1 August 1941 | 11:25 | ZKB-19 | |
| 18 | 10 July 1941 | 09:51 | RZ | | 37 | 1 August 1941 | 11:30 | ZKB-19 | |
| 19 | 11 July 1941 | 19:47 | I-16 | | 38 | 3 August 1941 | 16:40 | I-16 | over Kiev |

=== Awards ===
- Spanish Cross in Bronze with Swords (14 April 1939)
- Iron Cross (1939) 2nd and 1st Class
- Knight's Cross of the Iron Cross on 12 August 1941 as Oberleutnant and Staffelkapitän in the 7./Jagdgeschwader 3
- Decoration of Honour for Services to the Republic of Austria
  - Decoration of Merit in Silver
  - Decoration of Merit in Gold

== Notes ==
Military offices
| Preceded by Oberleutnant Erwin Neuerburg | Squadron Leader of 7./JG 3; 15 December 1940 – 3 August 1941 | Succeeded by Oberleutnant Hans Ohly |
