= Franz Eckerle =

German aerobatics pilot and World War II fighter pilot (1912–1942)

- Eckerle as a Hauptmann
- Born: 24 April 1912; Baden-Baden, Germany
- Died: 14 February 1942 (aged 29) missing in action near Velikiye Luki
- Military career
- Allegiance: Nazi Germany
- Branch: Luftwaffe
- Service years: 1935–1942
- Rank: Hauptmann (captain)
- Units: JG 135, JG 76, JG 54
- Commands: 3./JG 138, 3./JG 76, 6./JG 54; I./JG 54
- Conflicts: World War II
- Awards: Knight's Cross of the Iron Cross with Oak Leaves
- Other work: Aerobatics pilot

Franz Eckerle (24 April 1912 – 14 February 1942) was a German Luftwaffe military aviator and aerobatics pilot. During World War II, he was credited as a fighter ace with 59 aerial victories, four over the Western Allies and 55 on the Eastern Front. A fighter ace is a pilot credited with shooting down five or more enemy aircraft in aerial combat.

Born in Baden-Baden, Eckerle lived through the German Empire, the Weimar Republic and Nazi Germany. He joined the Luftwaffe in 1935, having already trained as a pilot. Following further training, he was posted to Jagdgeschwader 135. In 1938 and 1939, Eckerle competed in the German Aeronautical Nationals. At the outbreak of World War II, he was serving with Jagdgeschwader 76 and claimed his first aerial victory on 15 May 1940 during the Battle of France. After claiming further aerial victories during the Battle of Britain and Operation Barbarossa, the German invasion of the Soviet Union, Eckerle was awarded the Knight's Cross of the Iron Cross on 18 September 1941. In January 1942, Eckerle was appointed Gruppenkommandeur (group commander) of I. Gruppe (1st group) of Jagdgeschwader 54. He was reported missing in action and presumed killed in action following aerial combat near Schlüsselburg on 14 February 1942. Eckerle was posthumously awarded the Knight's Cross of the Iron Cross with Oak Leaves on 12 March 1942 for 59 aerial victories.

== Early life and career ==
Eckerle was born on 24 April 1912 in Baden-Baden, at the time in the Grand Duchy of Baden of the German Empire. Already trained as a pilot, he joined the military service of the Luftwaffe on 1 April 1935. In 1936, Eckerle attended the Jagdfliegerschule Schleißheim, the fighter pilot school at Schleißheim. On 1 April 1937, Eckerle was promoted to Leutnant (second lieutenant) and posted to the I. Gruppe (1st group) of Jagdgeschwader 135 (JG 135—135th Fighter Wing) based in Bad Aibling. The Gruppe had just been created on 15 March and was commanded by Major Max Ibel.

In 1938, flying a Klemm Kl 35, Eckerle placed fourth at the 10th German Aeronautical Nationals in Nuremberg. The following year, flying a Bücker Bü 133 Jungmeister, he placed second at the 11th German Aeronautical Nationals in Frankfurt.

Following the Anschluss, the annexation of Austria by Nazi Germany on 12 March 1938, Eckerle was posted to I. Gruppe of Jagdgeschwader 138 (JG 138—138th Fighter Wing) stationed at Wien-Schwechat and also known as the "Wiener-Jagdgruppe" ("Vienna fighter group"). There, he was appointed Staffelkapitän (squadron leader) of 3. Staffel (3rd squadron) of JG 138 in 1939. On 1 May 1939, his unit I./JG 138 was redesignated I. Gruppe of Jagdgeschwader 76 (I./JG 76—1st group of the 76th Fighter Wing).

== World War II ==
World War II in Europe began on Friday 1 September 1939 when German forces invaded Poland. In preparation of the invasion, I. Gruppe of JG 76 had been moved to an airfield at Stubendorf, present-day Izbicko in Poland, in mid-August 1939 and supported the German advance on the central and southern sectors of the front. On 14 September, I. Gruppe was withdrawn from combat operations and returned to its home airfield at Wien-Aspern where it arrived on 26 September. On 26 October, the Gruppenstab (headquarters unit) and 1. Staffel were ordered to Frankfurt Rhein-Main where it was united again with 2. and 3. Staffel on 2 November. From Frankfurt Rhein-Main, the Gruppe flew fighter protection during the "Phoney War" for the Frankfurt, Rhine and Saar region. In April 1940, I. Gruppe moved to an airfield at Mainz-Finthen, originally named Fliegerhorst Ober-Olm. The Gruppe stayed at Ober-Olm until the Battle of France began. Supporting the German crossing of the Meuse, Eckerle claimed his first and only aerial victory over a Supermarine Spitfire fighter on 15 May during the Battle of Sedan.

On 26 June 1940, I. Gruppe of JG 76 was moved to the airfield at Waalhaven in the Netherlands and subordinated to Jagdgeschwader 54 (JG 54—54th Fighter Wing). There, the Gruppe was tasked with providing aerial protection over the Dutch coastal area. On 5 July, I./JG 76 was officially integrated into JG 54 and was renamed to II./JG 54 and 3./JG 76 became 6./JG 54. On 25 August, II. Gruppe of JG 54 was placed under the command of Hauptmann Dietrich Hrabak.

=== War against the Soviet Union ===
Following the surrender of the Royal Yugoslav Army on 17 April 1941, while stationed at an airfield at Zemun near Belgrade, the Geschwader received orders on 3 May 1941 to turn over all Bf 109-Es so they could receive the new Bf 109-F variant. Transition training was completed at Airfield Stolp-Reitz in Pomerania. Following intensive training, the Geschwader was moved to airfields in Eastern Prussia. On 18 June, II. Gruppe relocated to Neukuhren, present-day Pionersky, and then to Trakehnen, present-day Yasnaya Polyana, on 20 June. The Wehrmacht launched Operation Barbarossa, the invasion of the Soviet Union, on 22 June with II. Gruppe supporting Army Group North in its strategic goal towards Leningrad. Prior, Eckerle was promoted to Hauptmann (captain) on 1 June 1941.

On the first day of the invasion, II. Gruppe flew multiple missions in support of German bombers attacking Soviet airfields near Kowno, present-day Kaunas. That day, Eckerle claimed a Tupolev SB bomber shot down. This was his fifth aerial victory in total. On 25 June, the Gruppe followed the German advance and relocated to an airfield at Kowno. Two days later they moved to Dünaburg, present-day Daugavpils. On 28 June, the 8th Panzer Division had established a bridgehead across the Daugava. Operating from Dünaburg, Eckerle claimed three Ilyushin DB-3 bombers shot down on 30 June over the bridgehead. Following his 30th aerial victory, Eckerle was awarded the Knight's Cross of the Iron Cross (Ritterkreuz des Eisernen Kreuzes) on 18 September. The presentation was made by General der Flieger Helmuth Förster, commanding general of the I. Fliegerkorps (1st Air Corps).

In early November, the Gruppe was withdrawn from the Eastern Front for a period of rest and replenishment where they were based at airfields in Döberitz, and later at Uetersen. By 20 December, the Gruppe had received 40 Focke-Wulf Fw 190 A fighter aircraft. The order for conversion to the Fw 190 was recanted and ordered to Jesau near Königsberg, present-day Kaliningrad in Russia, where they received 40 Bf 109-F-4 aircraft. During this period, Eckerle was transferred to the Gruppenstab of I. Gruppe of JG 54. Command of 6. Staffel was then passed to Hauptmann Carl Sattig.

=== Group commander and death ===
On 5 January 1942, Eckerle was appointed Gruppenkommandeur (group commander) of I. Gruppe of JG 54. He succeeded Hauptmann Erich von Selle who was transferred. The Gruppe was based at Krasnogvardeysk, present-day Gatchina and fought in the aerial battles of the Siege of Leningrad. On 7 January, the Soviet Volkhov Front attacked German forces at Volkhov river while the Soviet Northwestern Front attacked south of Lake Ilmen in what became the Battle of Lyuban. That day, Soviet bombers attacked Ziverskaya Airfield, defending against this attack, Eckerle shot down one aircraft. Over thex days, the Gruppe again flew missions in support of the Heer (army) along the Volkhov in the combat area southeast of Leningrad near Tosno. On 13 January, Eckerle was credited with shooting down a SB-2 bomber followed by two Polikarpov I-16 fighters shot down on 19 January.

Eckerle was forced to make an emergency landing in his Messerschmitt Bf 109 F-4 (Werknummer 9728—factory number) behind Soviet lines near Woronowo, southeast of Schlüsselburg, on 14 February 1942. He was posted as missing in action and presumed killed. He was posthumously honored with the Knight's Cross of the Iron Cross with Oak Leaves (Ritterkreuz des Eisernen Kreuzes mit Eichenlaub) on 12 March 1942 for 59 aerial victories. Eckerle was succeeded by Hauptmann Hans Philipp as commander of I. Gruppe. According to Soviet sources, Eckerle was shot down near Turyshkino, located approximately 12 kilometers (7.5 miles) southeast of Mga. He was likely shot down by Mladshiy Leytenant Petrukhin, Mladshiy Leytenant Markov, and Serzhant Savosin from 71 IAP (Fighter Aviation Regiment—Istrebitelny Aviatsionny Polk) of the KBF (Krasnoznamyonnyy Baltiyskiy Flot), the air force of the Red Banner Baltic Fleet. Page states that he was shot near Velikiye Luki. According to Dixon, Eckerle was captured by Soviet forces and beaten to death.

== Summary of career ==
=== Aerial victory claims ===
According to US historian David T. Zabecki, Eckerle was credited with 59 aerial victories. Obermaier also list him with 59 aerial victories claimed in an unknown number of combat missions. Scutts however lists him with 62 aerial victories claimed. Mathews and Foreman, authors of Luftwaffe Aces – Biographies and Victory Claims, researched the German Federal Archives and found documentation for 59 aerial victory claims, all of which confirmed. This number includes 55 on the Eastern Front and four on the Western Front.

Chronicle of aerial victories
This and the ? (question mark) indicates information discrepancies listed by Prien, Stemmer, Rodeike, Bock, Mathews and Foreman.
Claim	Date	Time	Type	Location	Claim	Date	Time	Type	Location
– 3. Staffel of Jagdgeschwader 76 – Battle of France – 10 May – 25 June 1940
1	15 May 1940	12:00	Spitfire						
– 6. Staffel of Jagdgeschwader 54 – At the Channel and over England – 26 June 1940 – 29 March 1941
2	30 July 1940	20:04	Blenheim	Vlissingen	4	9 November 1940	11:45	Spitfire	3 km (1.9 mi) east of Deal
3	1 August 1940	16:50	Blenheim	5 km (3.1 mi) off Haamstede					
– 6. Staffel of Jagdgeschwader 54 – Operation Barbarossa – 22 June – 5 December 1941
5	22 June 1941	17:30	SB-2		22	25 July 1941	07:55	DB-3	
6	30 June 1941	06:50	DB-3		23	10 August 1941	04:10	I-16	
7	30 June 1941	06:51	DB-3		24	12 August 1941	12:35	I-18 (MiG-1)	
8	30 June 1941	12:32	DB-3		25	12 August 1941	17:45	I-153	
9	2 July 1941	20:30	SB-3		26	14 August 1941	11:15	I-16	east of Petrovskoye
10	2 July 1941	20:32	SB-3		27	18 August 1941	12:15	I-18 (MiG-1)	
11	2 July 1941	20:40	SB-3		28	22 August 1941	19:18	I-16	
12	6 July 1941	04:05	SB-2		29	22 August 1941	19:21	I-16	
13	7 July 1941	06:46	DB-3		30	23 August 1941	18:50	I-16	
14	7 July 1941	15:50	SB-3		31	3 September 1941	11:30	I-18 (MiG-1)	
15	17 July 1945	09:35	SB-2		32	8 September 1941	13:30	I-18 (MiG-1)	
16	19 July 1941	20:45	SB-2		33	8 September 1941	13:40	I-18 (MiG-1)	
17	19 July 1941	20:46	SB-2		34	15 September 1941	17:20	I-18 (MiG-1)	
18	22 July 1941	09:56	I-18 (MiG-1)		35	17 September 1941	13:45	low wing monoplane	
19	22 July 1941	18:15	I-18 (MiG-1)		36	19 September 1941	07:07	SB-3	
20	23 July 1941	03:25	I-16		37	19 September 1941	07:09	SB-3	
21	23 July 1941	03:26	I-16		38	14 October 1941	15:30	SB-3	
– Stab I. Gruppe of Jagdgeschwader 54 – Eastern Front – 6 December 1941 – 14 February 1942
39	1 January 1942	10:35	I-16		50	28 January 1942	12:06	I-18 (MiG-1)	
40	1 January 1942	10:42	I-16		51	30 January 1942	11:11	I-18 (MiG-1)	
41	1 January 1942	14:08	I-153		52? (Note: This claim is not listed by Mathews and Foreman.)	2 February 1942	14:44	I-16	10 km (6.2 mi) south-southwest of Narva
42	7 January 1942	14:50	I-16		53	3 February 1942	09:25	I-18 (MiG-1)	
43	13 January 1942	08:53	SB-2		54	3 February 1942	09:45	I-18 (Mig-1)	
44	19 January 1942	11:05	I-16		55	5 February 1942	15:37	I-18 (MiG-1)	
45	19 January 1942	11:10	I-16		? (Note: This claim is not listed by Prien, Stemmer, Rodeike and Bock.)	6 February 1942	11:25	MiG-1	
46	21 January 1942	09:30	Il-2		56	7 February 1942	09:15	I-16	
47	26 January 1942	13:22	I-18 (MiG-1)		57	7 February 1942	13:00	I-16? (Note: According to Mathews and Foreman claimed as a Polikarpov Po-2 also U-2.)	
48	28 January 1942	09:03	I-180 (Yak-7)		58	7 February 1942	15:42	Il-2	
49	28 January 1942	09:06	I-180 (Yak-7)		59	14 February 1942	14:25	I-153	vicinity of Woronovo

=== Awards ===
- Iron Cross (1939)
  - 2nd Class (13 September 1939)
  - 1st Class (11 August 1940)
- Knight's Cross of the Iron Cross with Oak Leaves
  - Knight's Cross on 18 September 1941 as Hauptmann and Staffelkapitän of the 1./Jagdgeschwader 54
  - 82nd Oak Leaves on 12 March 1942 as Hauptmann and Gruppenkommandeur of the I./Jagdgeschwader 54
