= Aspern Nord station =

Vienna U-Bahn station

Aspern Nord
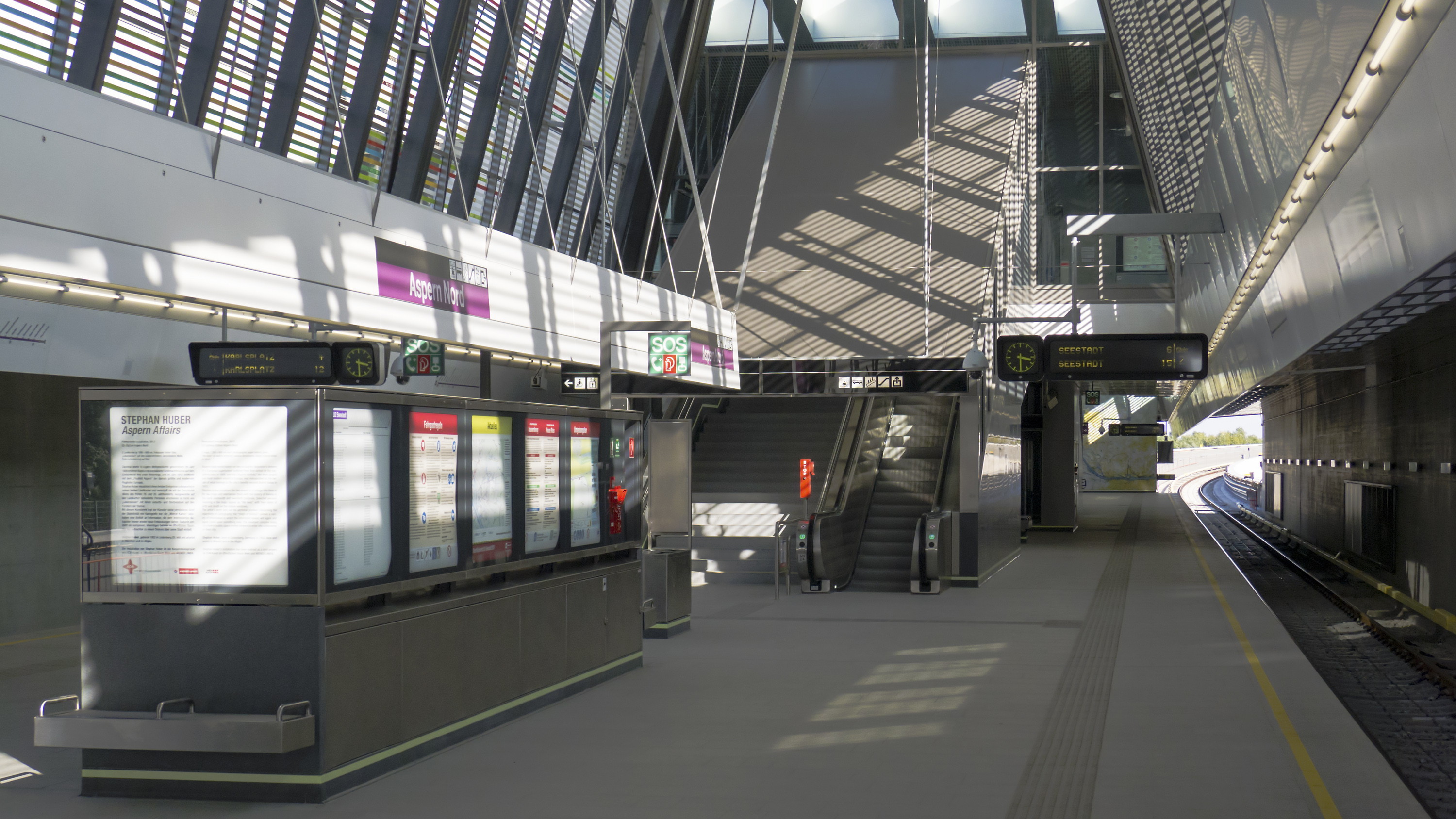

General information
- Location: Donaustadt, Vienna; Austria
- Coordinates: 48.234492°N 16.504583°E
- Tram routes: 27 (from autumn 2025)
- Bus routes: 89A, 95A, 99A, 99B

History
- Opened: October 5, 2013

Services
Preceding station	Wiener Linien	Following station
Hausfeldstraße toward Karlsplatz	U2	Seestadt Terminus
Location

Aspern Nord is a metro station on the U2 line of the Vienna U-Bahn, located in Seestadt Aspern in Donaustadt, Vienna's 22nd district. It opened in 2013 as part of the fourth expansion of the U2. It is connected to the Wien Aspern Nord railway station.

== About ==
The station is one of two in the Seestadt, along with Seestadt station. Due to low demand, only every second train on the U2 travels to Seestadt, with the others terminating at Aspernstraße. The frequency of trains to Seestadt will increase as the area continues to grow.

The metro station is located next to the Wien Aspern Nord railway station, which is served by the REX train between Hauptbahnhof and Bratislava, the regional R train between the Hauptbahnhof and Marchegg, and the S-Bahn S80 to Wien Hütteldorf. Buses from the Wiener Linien, including routes 89A, 95A, 99A, and 99B, stop at the station. The upcoming 27 tram, set to open in autumn 2025, will connect Donaustadt and Floridsdorf, running from Aspern Nord to Strebersdorf.

The station has escalators and a lift.

== Art ==
The design of glass elements of the station were provided by German artist Stephan Huber. He won the competition for the design with his Aspern Affairs project. The station features expansive glass overhead lighting along its sides. At both ends of the platform, there are large concrete walls, approximately ten by six meters in size. Huber's Aspern Affairs artwork commemorates two significant historical events in Aspern: Napoleon's first ever defeat in 1809 at the Battle of Aspern-Essling and the opening of Europe’s largest airport, Wien-Aspern Airport, in 1912. His maps, made from collaged American military charts, blend historical accuracy with subjective interpretations, mixing surreal elements and a variety of visual references to create a dynamic artwork.

== Gallery ==
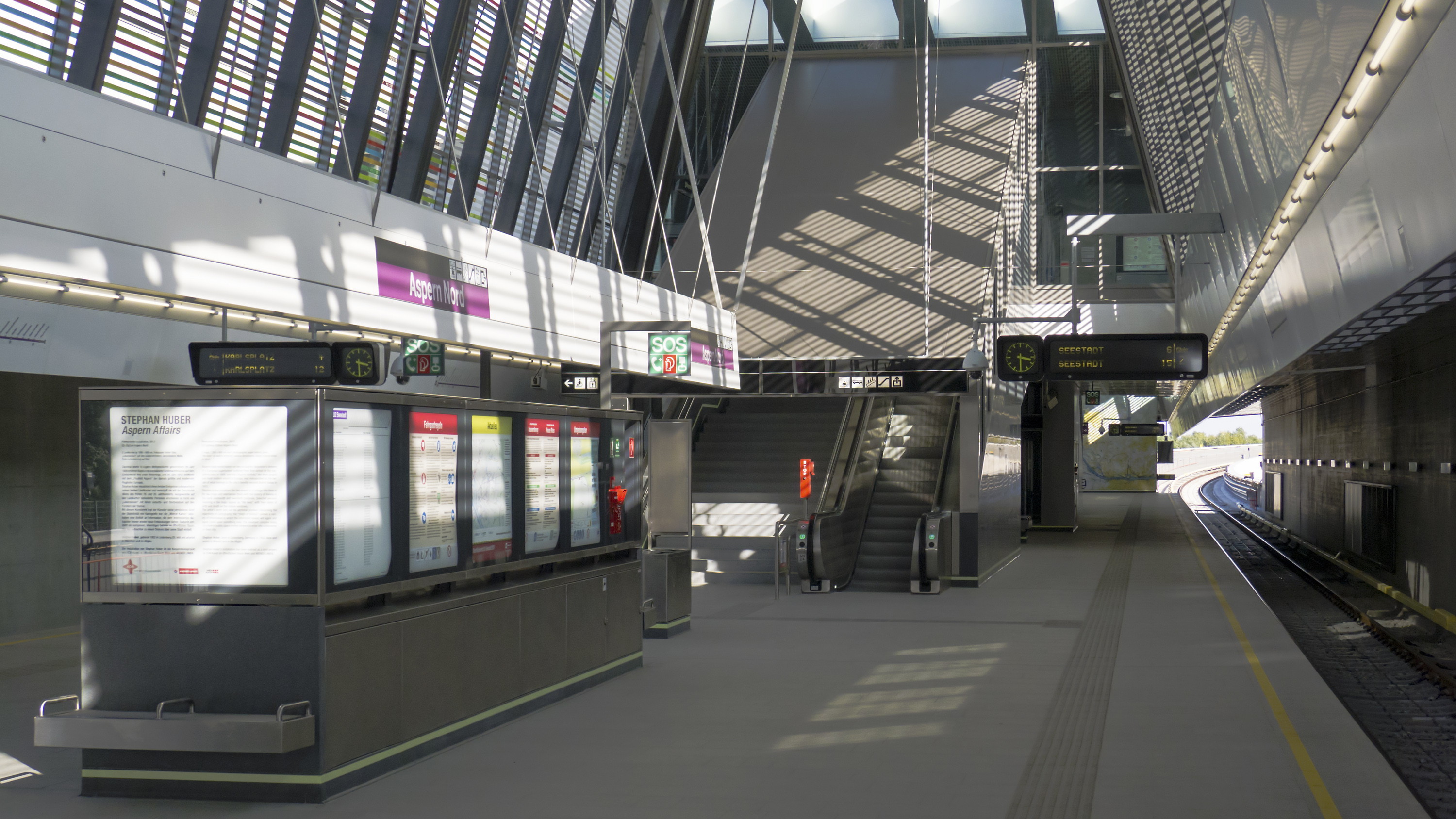
Platform

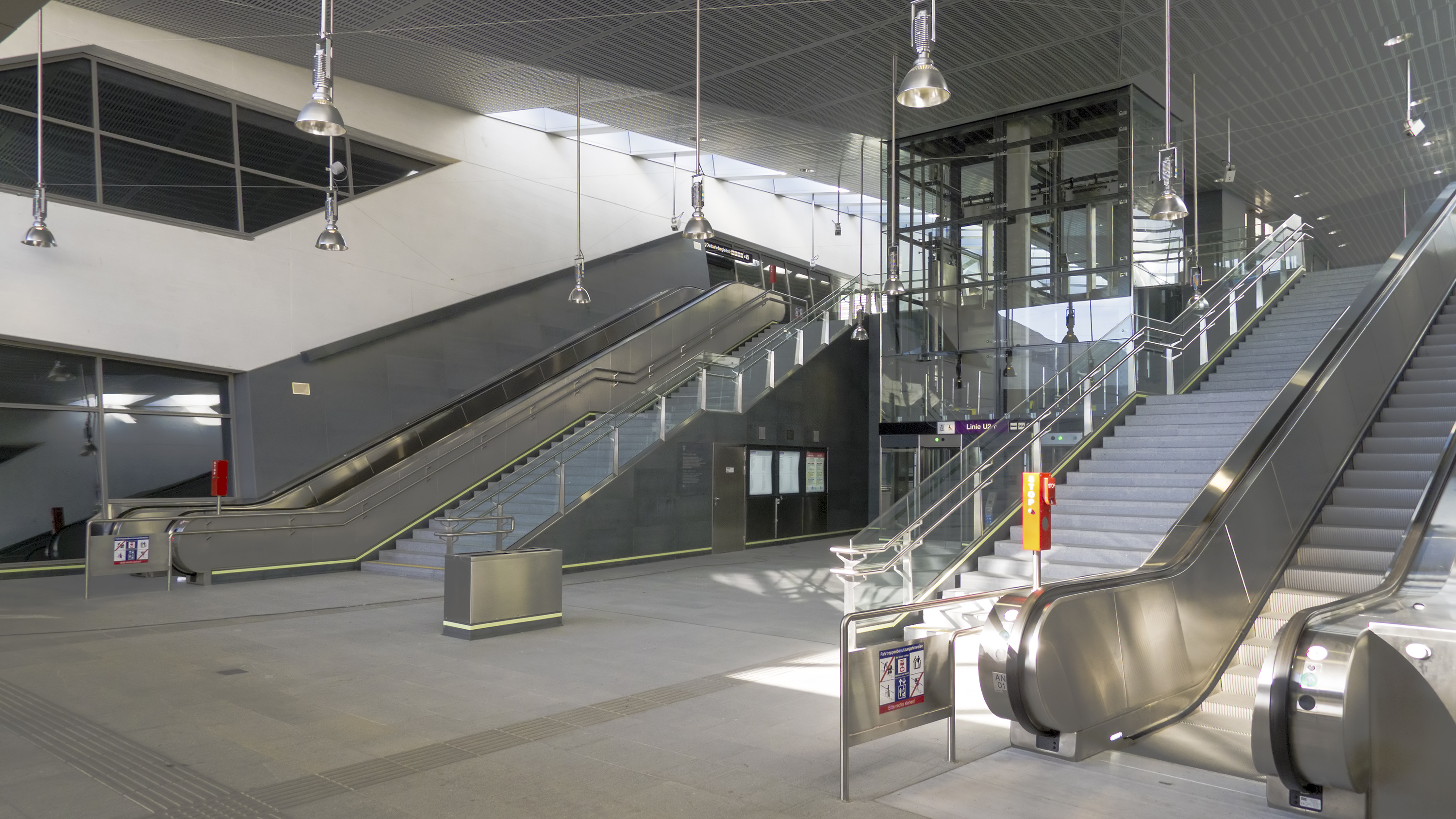
Interior
