= Seestadt Aspern =

Area of Donaustadt, Vienna, Austria

- Neighbourhood
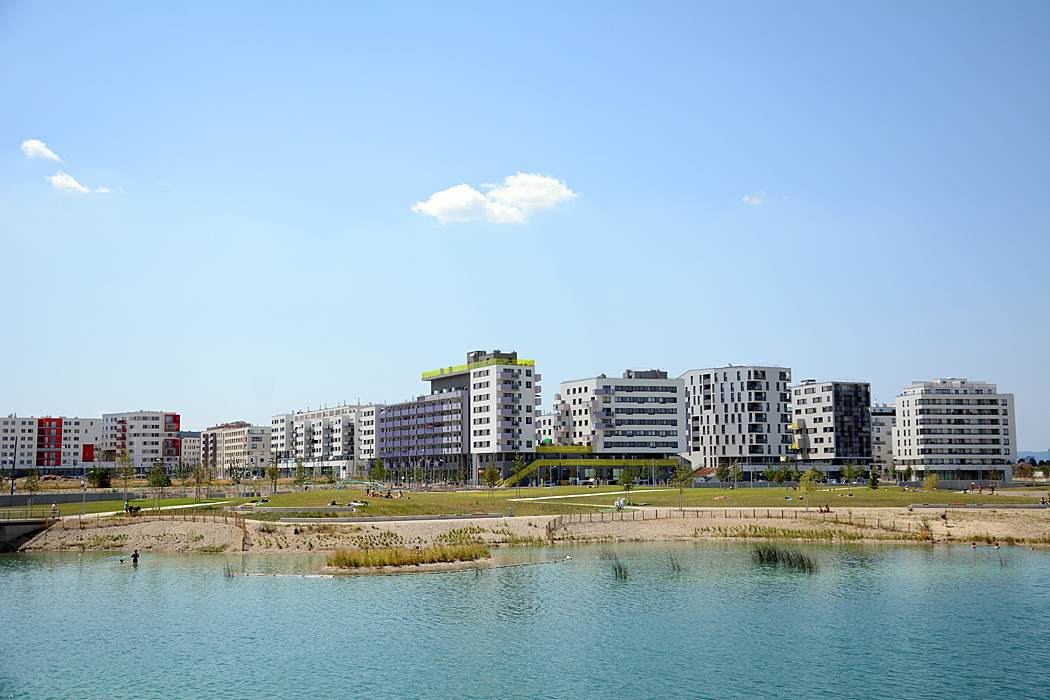

- Seal
- Interactive map of Seestadt Aspern
- Coordinates: 48.225916°N 16.508188°E
- First built: 2007
- First settled: 2014

Area
  - Total: 2.4 km^{2} (0.93 sq mi)
  - Water: 0.05 km^{2} (0.019 sq mi)
- Elevation: 157 m (515 ft)

Population (2023)
  - Total: 12,000
  - Density: 5,000/km^{2} (13,000/sq mi)
- Time zone: UTC+1 (CET)
- Postal code: 1220
- Website: https://www.aspern-seestadt.at/en

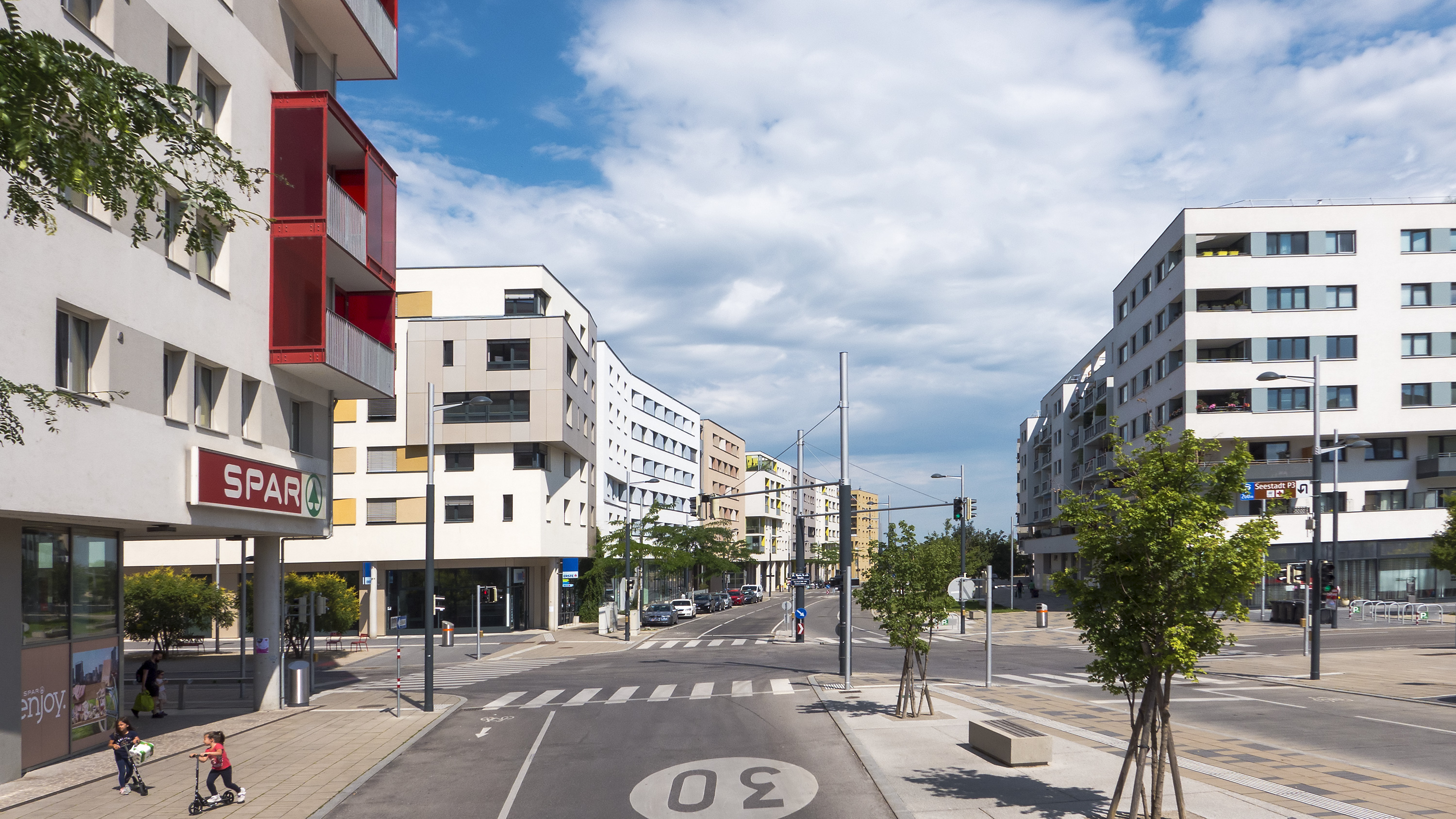
Sonnenallee

Seestadt Aspern is a significant urban development project under construction within Vienna's 22nd city district, Donaustadt, Vienna, Austria. It is one of the largest ongoing urban development projects in Europe. By completion there are expected to be 25,000 residents and 20,000 jobs in the city. The city is named after the Aspern Lake, a man-made lake dug in its centre.

== Location ==
The city lies about 10 km northeast of the centre of Vienna, just north of the Lobau and west of the Marchfeld. It spans an area of approximately 2.4 km^{2}.

The city was built on the ground of the Wien-Aspern Airport. The airfield originally served citizens, but was later repurposed by the military during the two World Wars. It was decommissioned during the 1980s and taken apart in the early 21st century.

== History ==
In response to the 2004 enlargement of the EU, the city proposed the development of the airfield into an independent quarter of Vienna. In 2005, the council held a competition for the design of a masterplan for the new city, which was won by Swedish architecture firm Tovatt Architects & Planners in cooperation with the German office N+ Objektmanagement. In May 2007 the municipal council of Vienna unanimously agreed to set forth with the plan.

The project was divided into three stages:

- Stage 1 (2009–2017): construction of main infrastructure, roads, green areas and other infrastructure, construction of the first residential and office buildings in the south-western part of the district.
- Stage 2 (years 2017–2022): construction of a connecting junction at Aspern Nord station, construction of a road connection with the A23 motorway, further expansion of residential and office and service buildings.
- Stage 3 (years 2022–2028): completion of the construction of the last buildings and common areas in the northern part of the city.

The first road construction works began in 2012. The Aspern IQ Technology Centre with approximately 7000 m^{2} of usable space was the first building on the site. The U2 line with the Aspern Nord and Seestadt stations was completed in 2013. In 2014, the Seestadt district management began its work, which focuses on neighbourhood work with the new residents until the project's completion. The Seepark was opened in July 2015. One year after the start of settlement, the population had already exceeded 6000. At the beginning of 2016, work began on the Seeparkquartier south of the lake. One of the first projects undertaken was the HoHo Wien, a wooden hybrid high-rise building. In 2020, the 230,000 m^{2} Seeparkquartier was largely completed. The design of the public space, characterised by large asphalt areas, soon sparked media controversy. In spring 2022, the pedestrian zone was redesigned and supplemented with 1,000 m^{2} of perennial beds, 25 new trees, and water features. The construction of the Seeparkquartier will be completed in 2024 with the construction of the Aspern NOA22 medical centre.

A new training centre for the Austrian Football Association was under construction in the Seestadt as of 2025.

== Transit ==
The entire road network has a speed limit of 30 km/h. A limit of 80 parking spaces per 100 apartments was introduced. Many roads have either a bike lane or a separated bike path.

=== Public transport ===
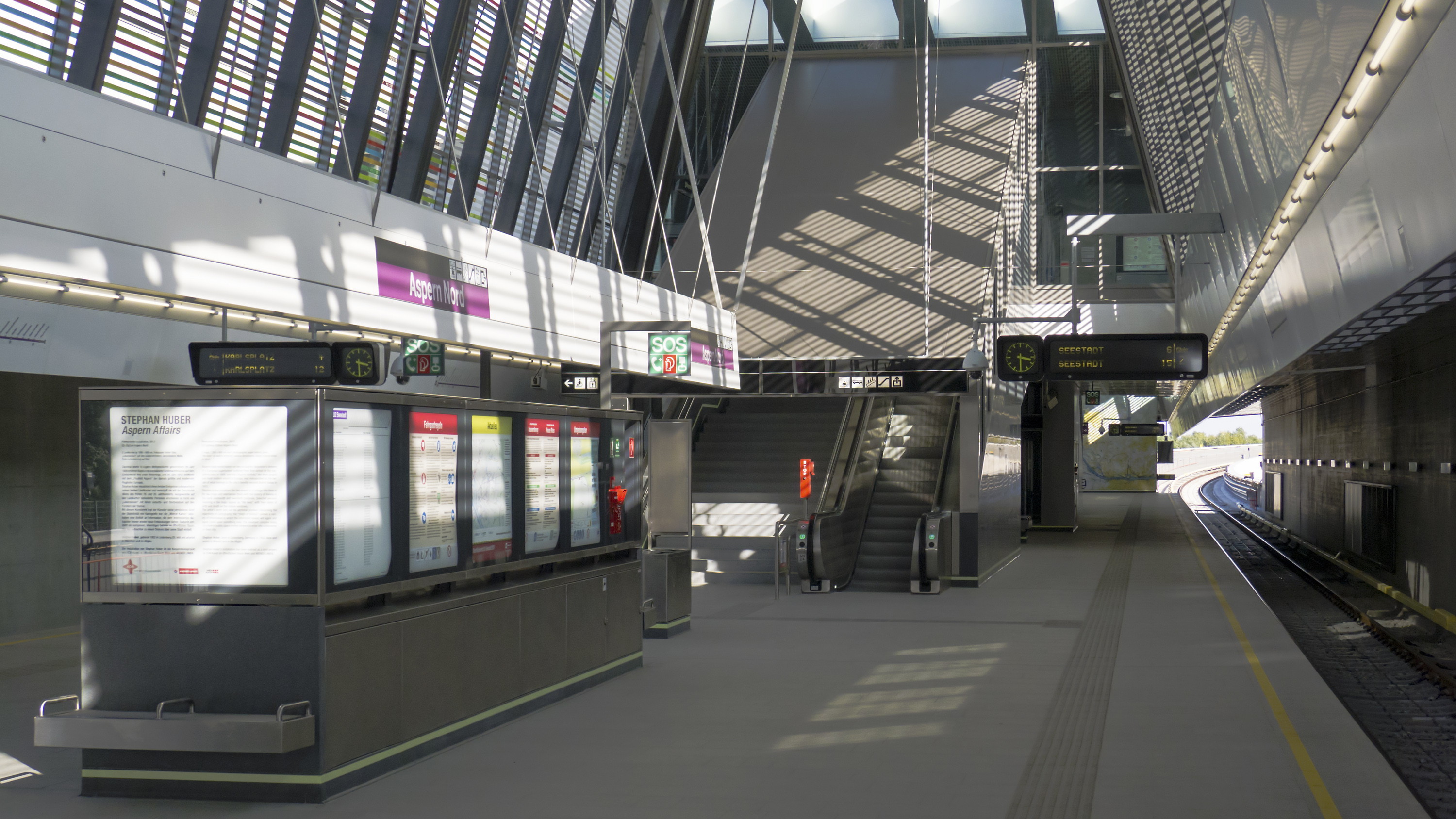
Aspern Nord station

Seven Wiener Linien bus lines are operated within the city. The Seestadt and Aspern Nord stations on the U2 metro line were established during the construction of the city. The latter station also hosts the S80 S-Bahn line as well as various ÖBB regional trains. With the opening of the 27 tram in October 2025, Seestadt was connected to the Vienna tram network for the first time.

== Street Names ==
As Vienna, as of July 2020, had just 519 streets named after women compared to 4022 named after men, many roads in Seestadt are dedicated to women. Examples include:

- Ada-Lovelace-Straße
- Barbara-Prammer-Allee
- Doris-Lessing-Allee
- Edith-Piaf-Straße
- Ilse-Aichinger-Gasse
- Janis-Joplin-Promenade
- Maria-Trapp-Platz
- Simone-de-Beauvoir-Platz
- Trude-Fleischmann-Gasse
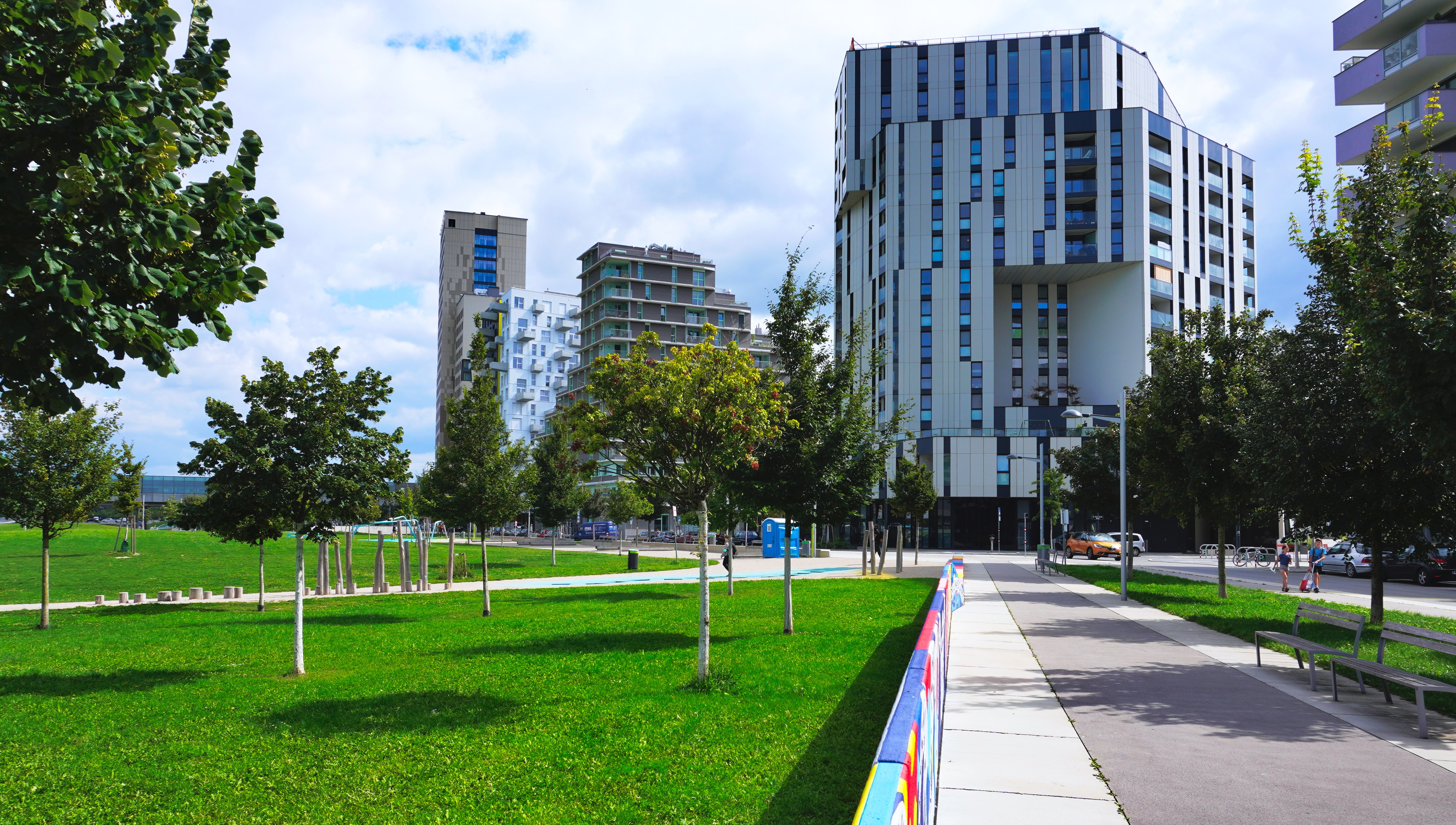
- View from the Janis-Joplin-Promenade
  Zaha-Hadid-Platz

Additionally, multiple parks in the city are named after women, such as:

- Elinor-Ostrom-Park
- Hannah-Arendt-Park
- Madame-d’Ora-Park
- Pippi-Langstrumpf-Park
- Yella-Hertzka-Park

== Gallery ==
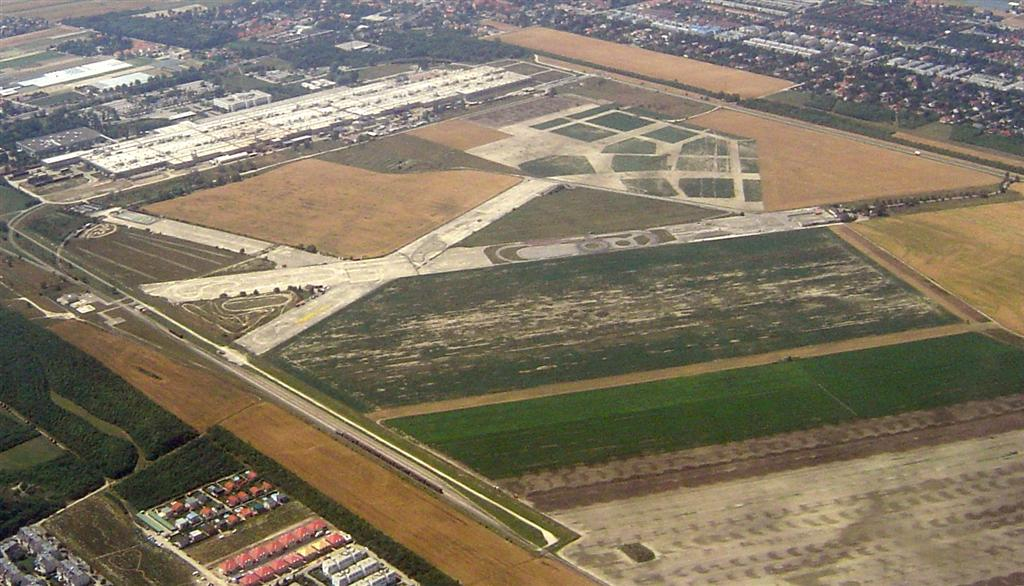
The airfield on which the city was built.

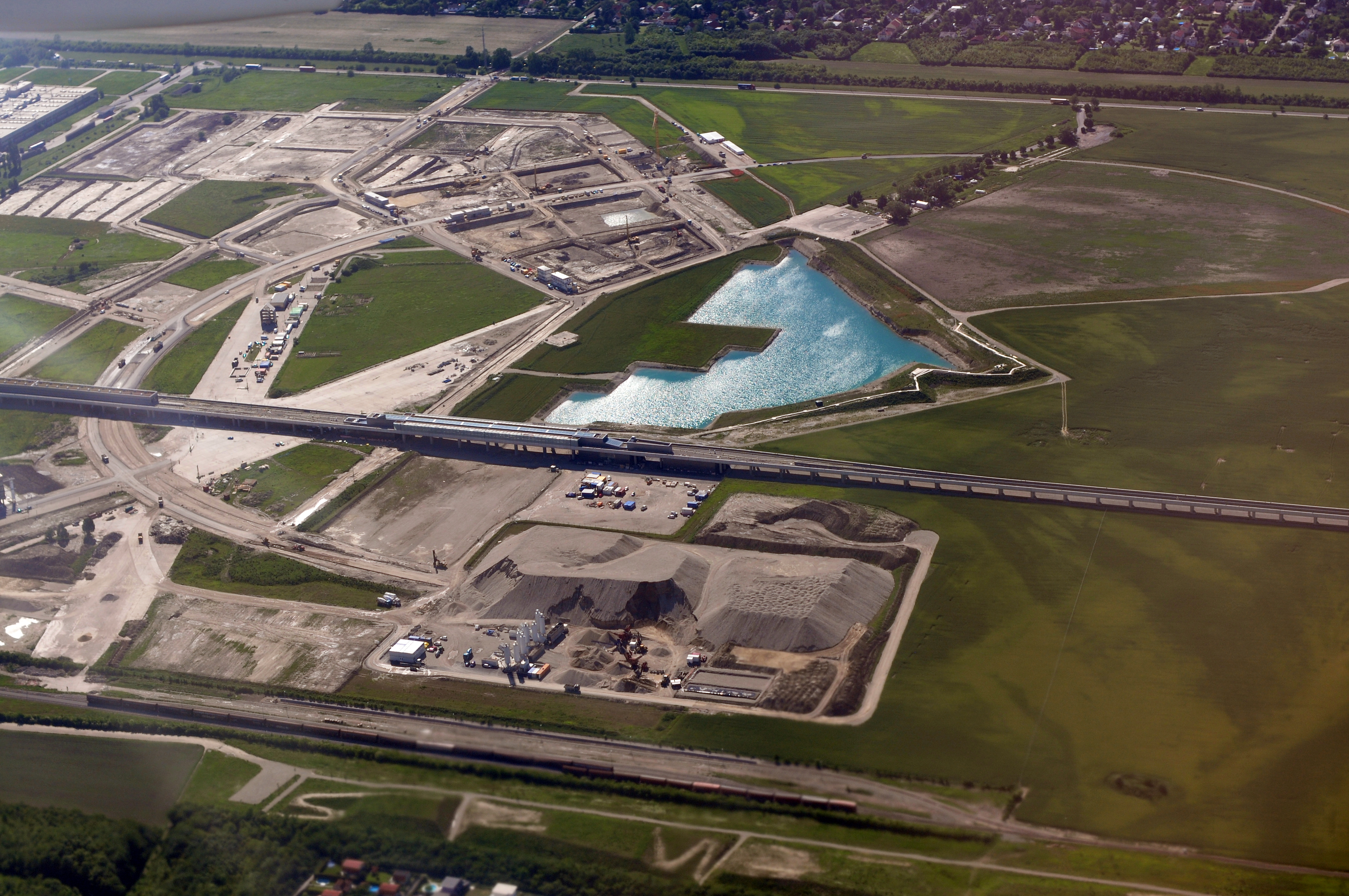
The lake

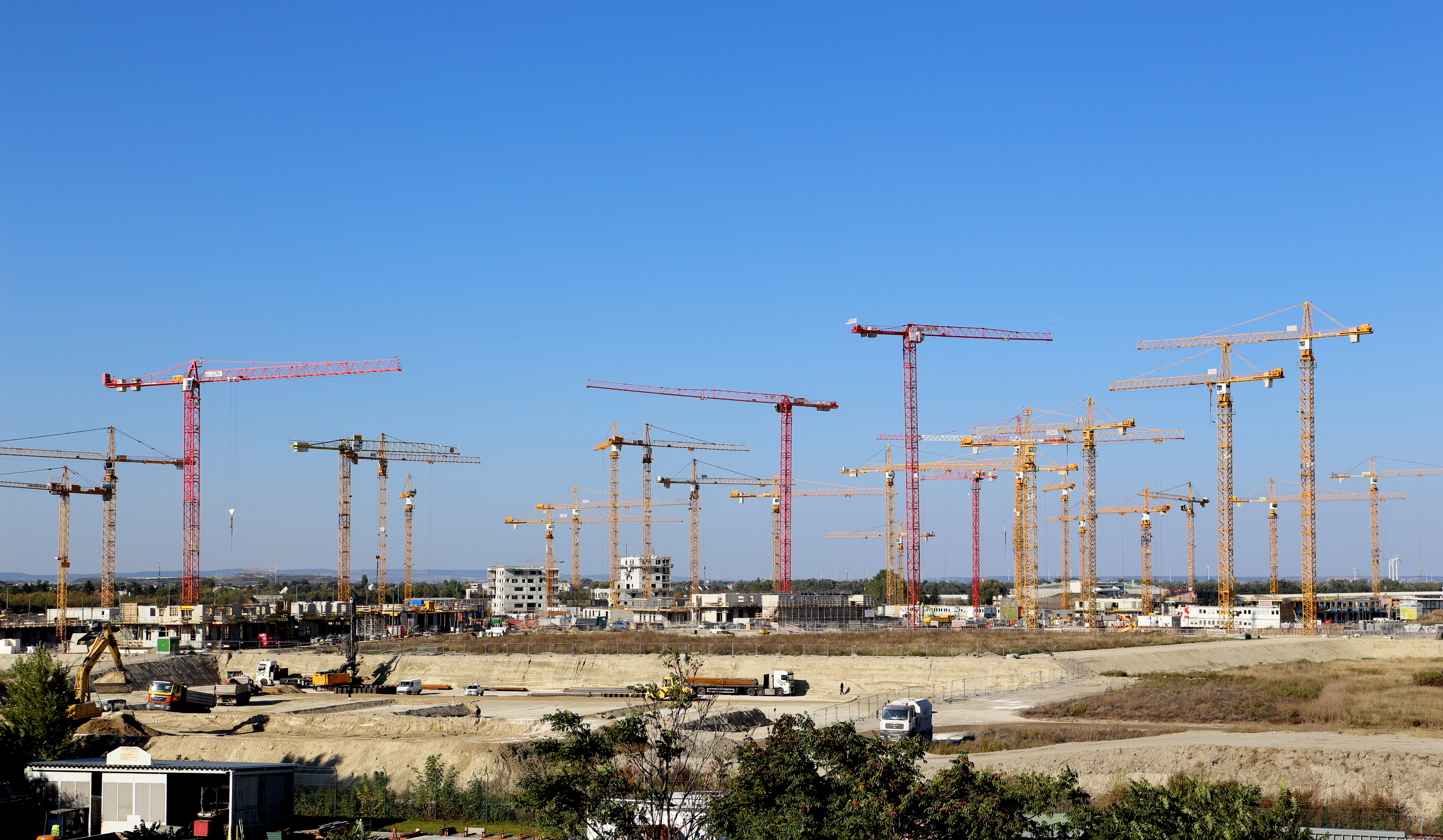
The city being built in 2013.
