= Hausfeldstraße station =

Vienna U-Bahn U2 station

Hausfeldstraße
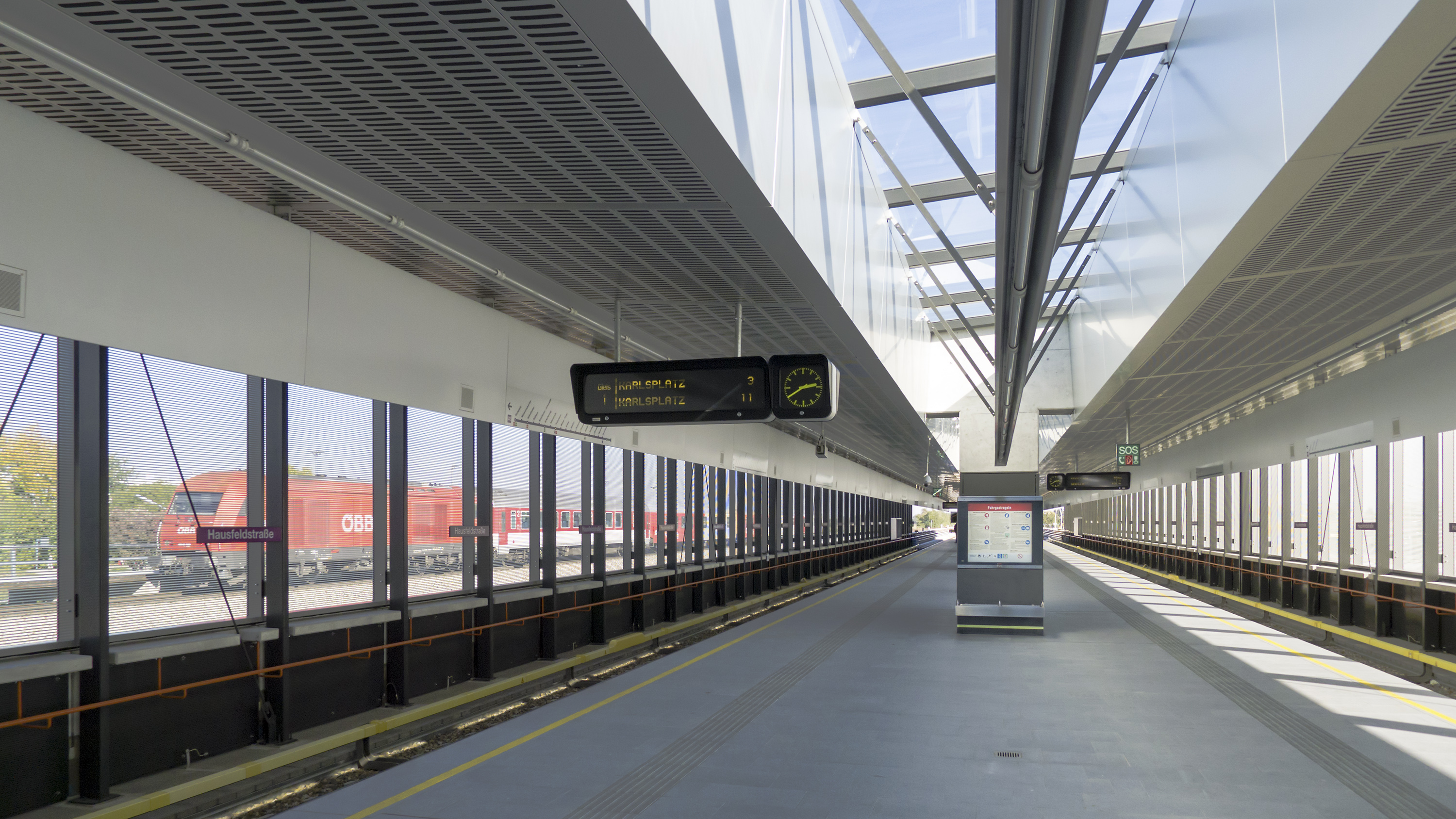

General information
- Location: Donaustadt, Vienna; Austria
- Coordinates: 48.233678°N 16.485572°E
- Tram routes: 26
- Bus routes: 85A, 95B, 97A

History
- Opened: October 5, 2013

Services
Preceding station	Wiener Linien	Following station
Lina-Loos-Platz toward Karlsplatz	U2	Aspern Nord toward Seestadt
Location

Hausfeldstraße is a metro station on the U2 line of the Vienna U-Bahn, located in Aspern, Donaustadt, Vienna's 22nd district. It opened on 5 October 2013 as part of the fourth expansion of the U2.

== About ==
Situated north-east of the preceding Aspernstraße station, Hausfeldstraße was part of the fourth extension of the U2 in 2013, continuing on to Aspern Nord and ending at Seestadt. When built, the area it served was still largely uninhabited. Formerly a station of the Österreichische Bundesbahnen (ÖBB), it consisted of an electrified stub track, where the S80 had its terminus, and a platform on the through track towards Marchegg on the Slovak border. On October 1, 2018, the station was closed, and its functions as a train station were taken over by the Wien Aspern Nord station. The station has two lifts and an elevator, as well as a public restroom group with an accessible toilet.

The subway station is located west of Hausfeldstraße, parallel to the Marchegger Ostbahn (railway line Vienna - Bratislava) which runs north of the station. It is a two-track station with a central platform in an elevated position, about three metres above the road. The eastern exit leads to Hausfeldstraße, which passes under both the U2 and the Marchegger Ostbahn. To the south of the station is a turning loop for the tram line 25 and the bus lines that terminate here. The western exit leads to Hasibederstraße via an underpass.

The station connects to the bus lines 85A, 95B, and 97A, as well as the 26 tram.

== Gallery ==
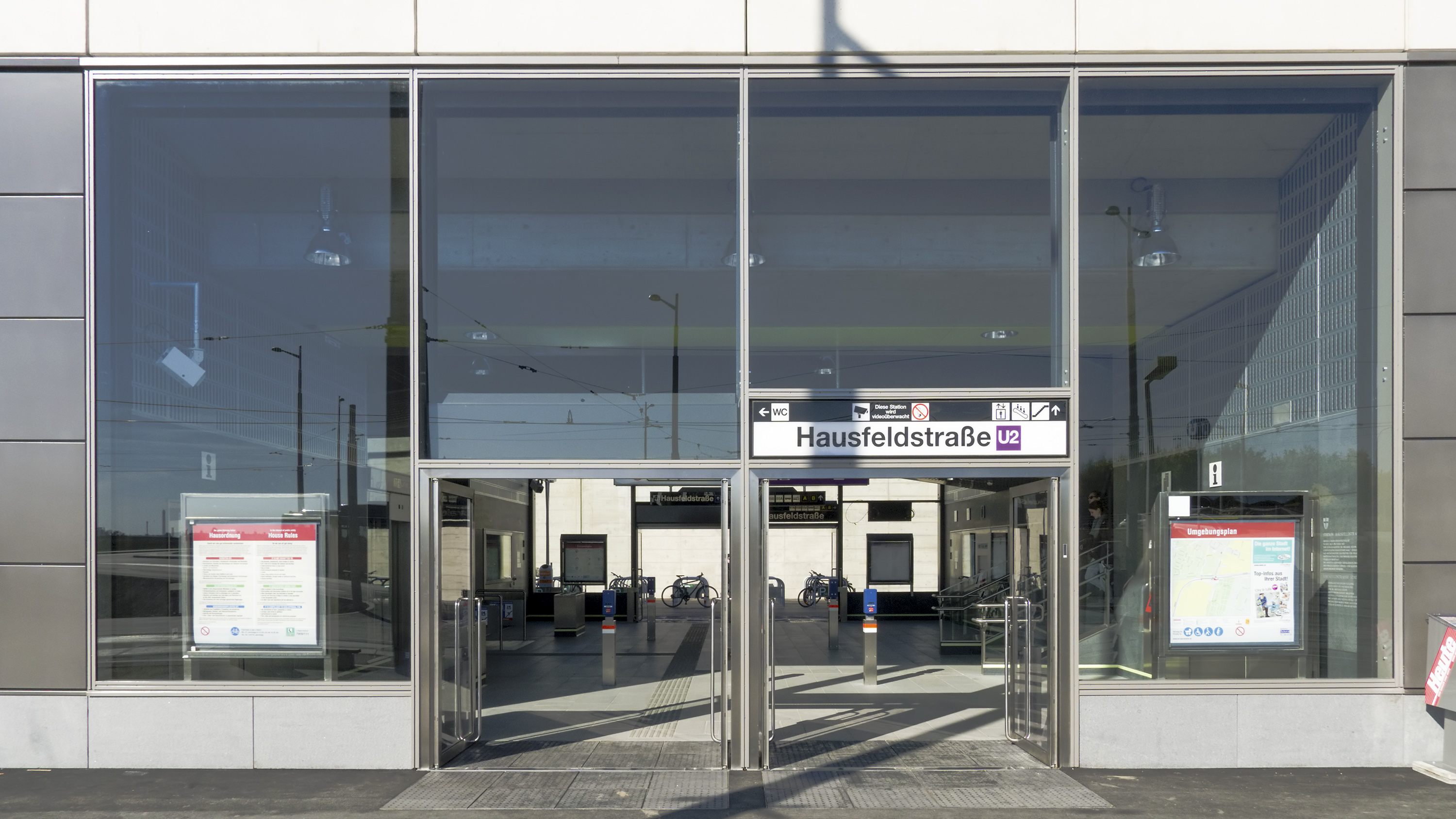
Entrance

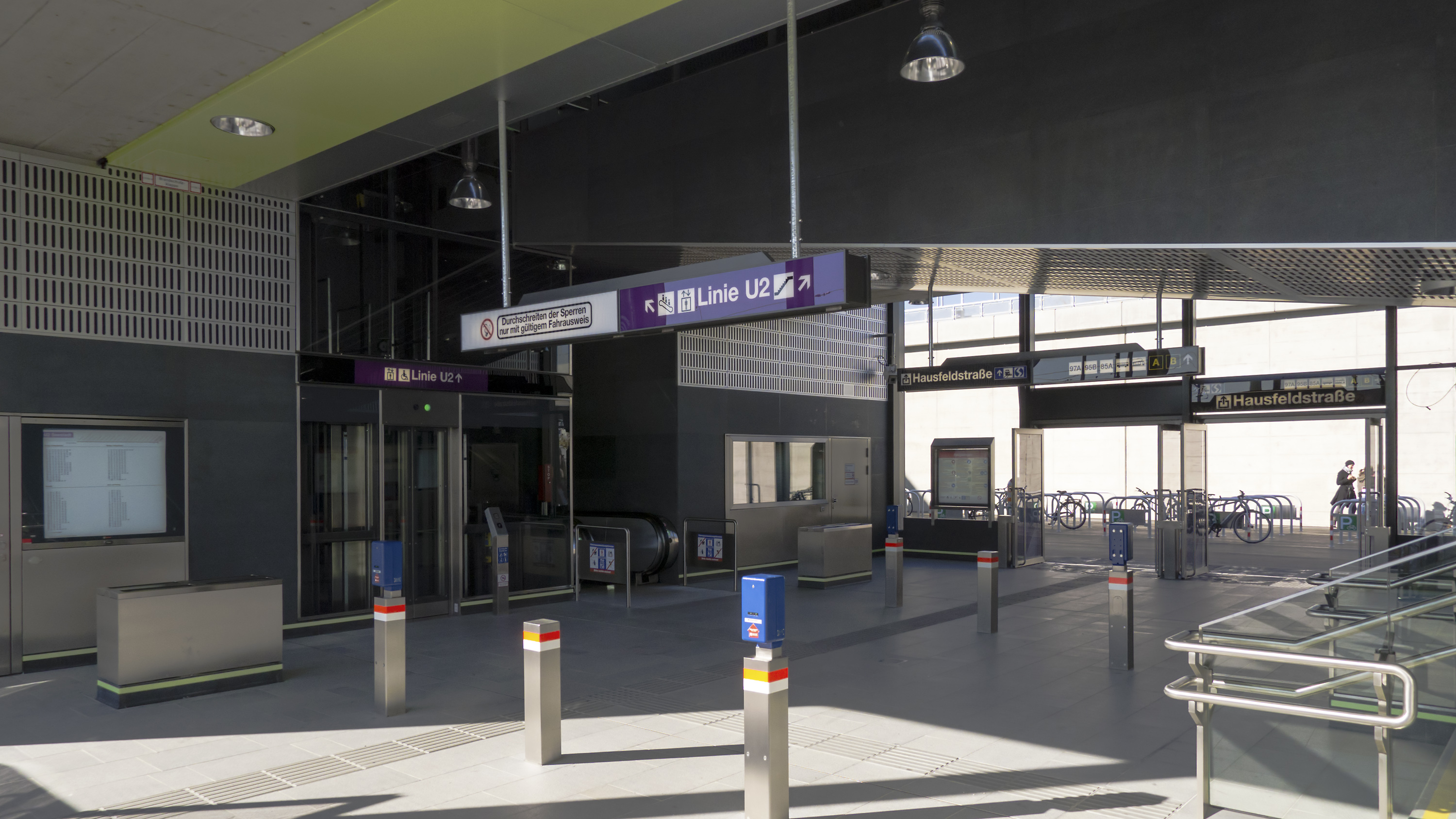
Interior

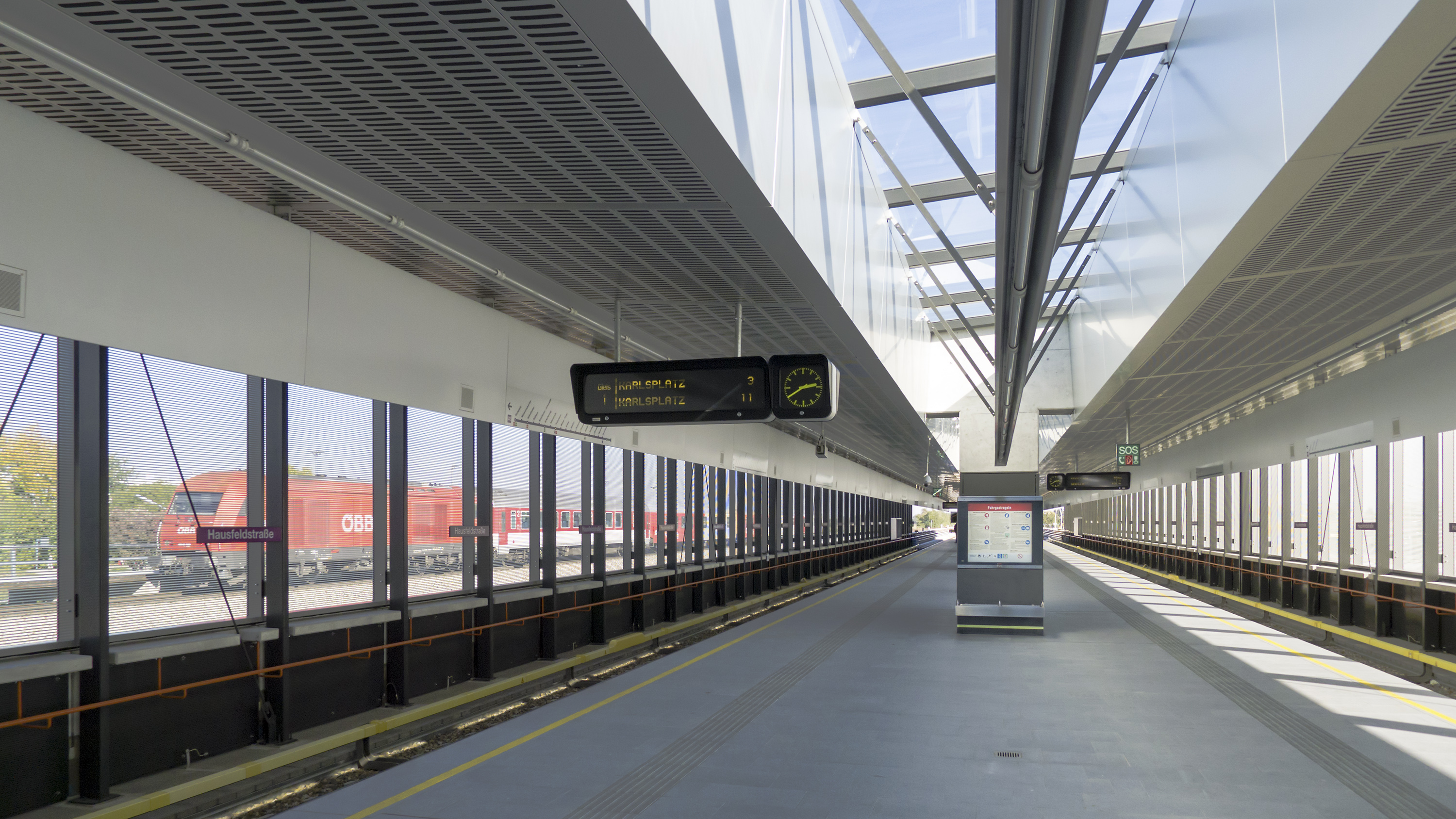
Platform

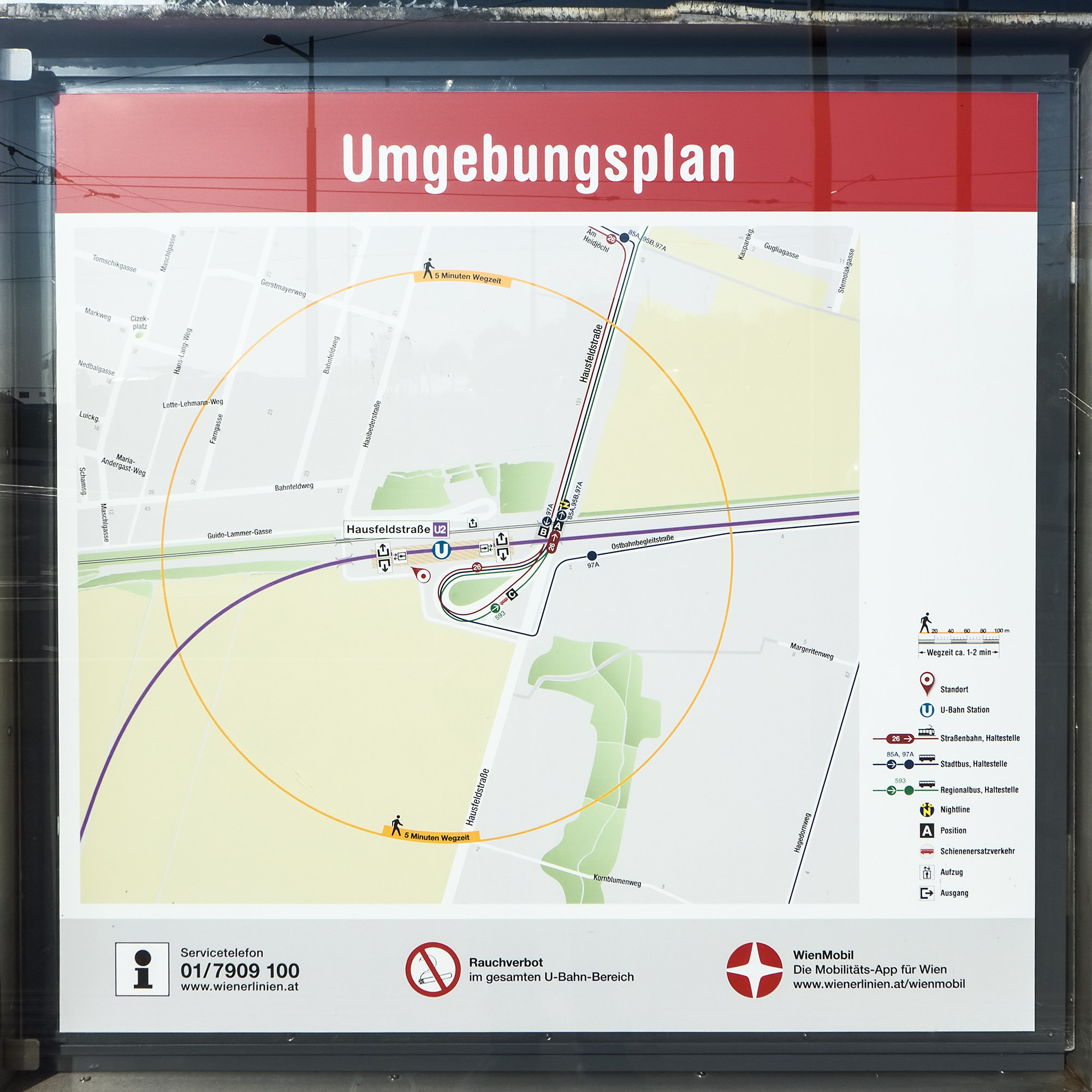
Map of the surrounding area

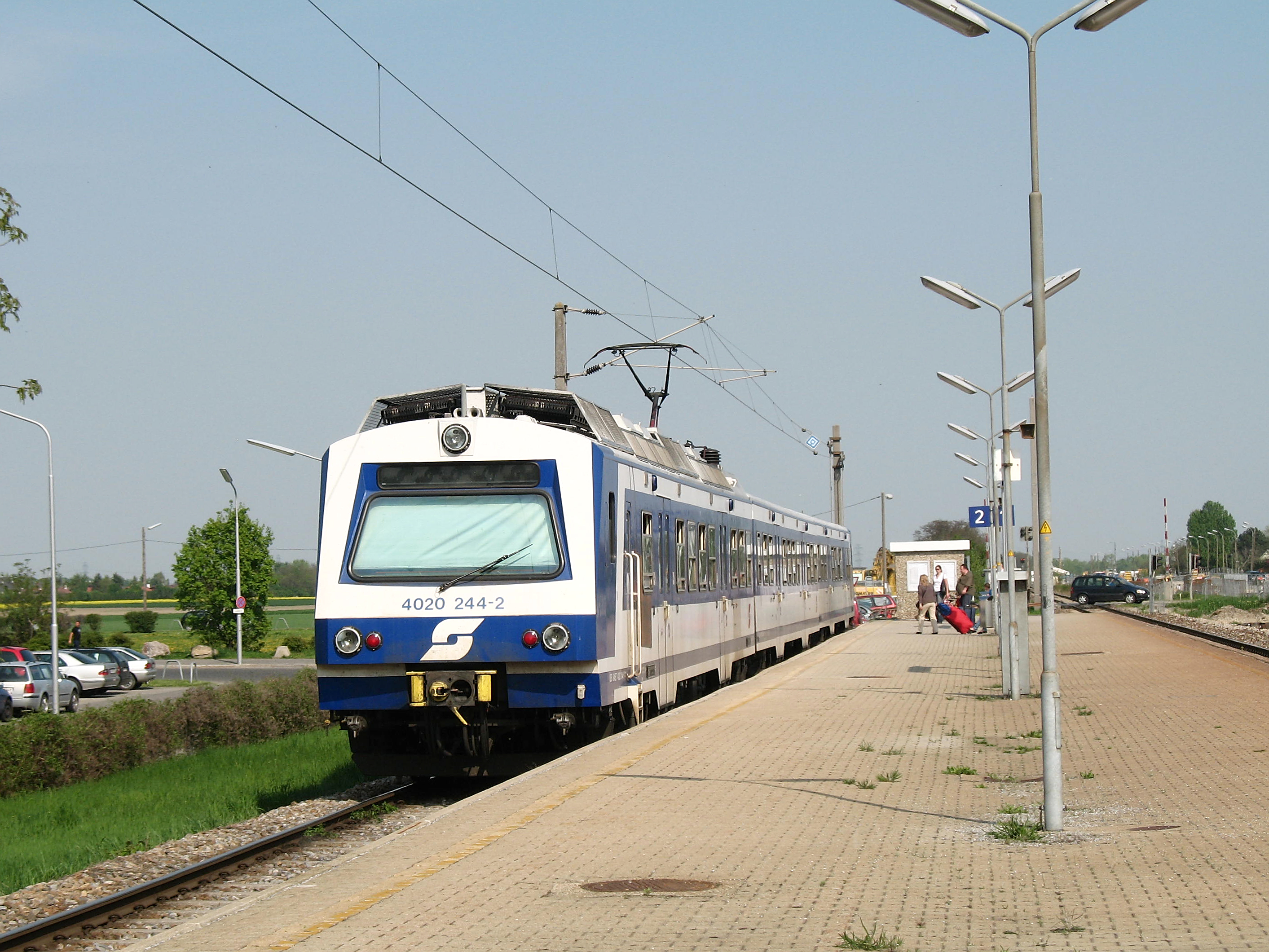
An S-Bahn before the repurposing.
