= Seestadt station =

Vienna U-Bahn station

Seestadt
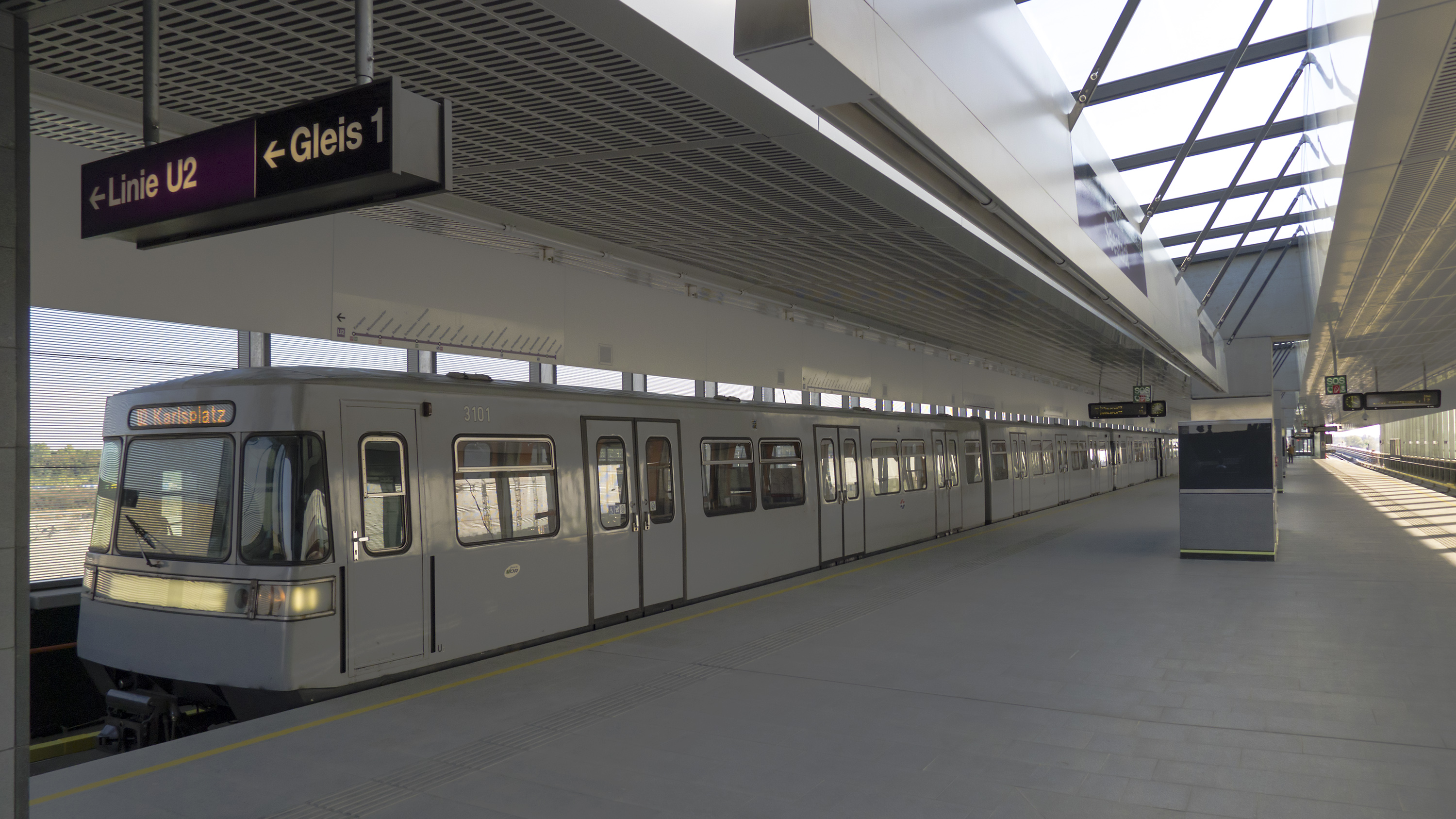

General information
- Location: Donaustadt, Vienna; Austria
- Coordinates: 48.225916°N 16.508188°E

History
- Opened: October 5, 2013

Services
Preceding station	Wiener Linien	Following station
Aspern Nord toward Karlsplatz	U2	Terminus
Location

Seestadt is a metro station on the U2 line of the Vienna U-Bahn, located in Seestadt Aspern in Donaustadt, Vienna's 22nd district. It opened in 2013 as the final stop on the line.

== History ==
The station opened on 5 October 2013 as part of the fourth phase of the Vienna U-Bahn expansion from Aspernstraße, becoming the eastern terminus of the U2. It is one of two metro stations serving the Seestadt, alongside Aspern Nord. Due to low demand, only every second train on the U2 travels to Seestadt, with the others terminating at Aspernstraße. The frequency of trains going to Seestadt will increase as the area continues to grow.

Seestadt station is located in the center of Seestadt Aspern, a newly developed urban area in the east of Vienna. At the time of the station’s opening in 2013, the surrounding area was largely undeveloped, and construction is still ongoing. The station spans Lake Aspern, an artificial body of water created as part of the development project.

The station is situated on a single elevated structure and features a fully enclosed central platform with exits on both the northern and southern shores of the lake. To the south of the station, at Ada-Lovelace-Straße, a four-track reversing facility and a stabling and inspection hall were constructed to accommodate up to six long trains. The station was built without escalators.

A bus terminal is located at the southern entrance on Seestadtstraße, offering connections to Essling and the southwestern parts of the Seestadt. The area surrounding the northern entrance is still under development.

== Gallery ==
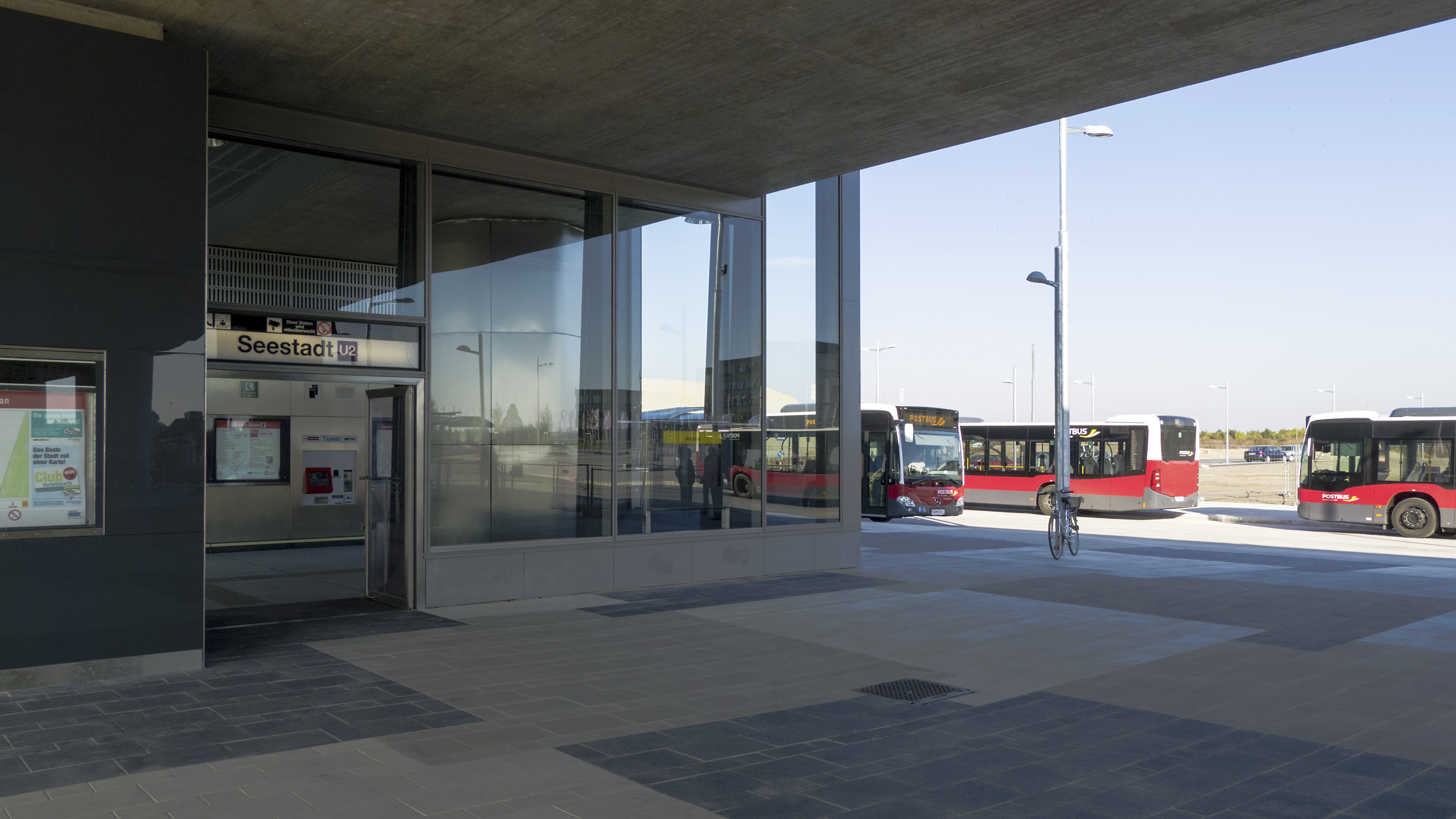
The southern area

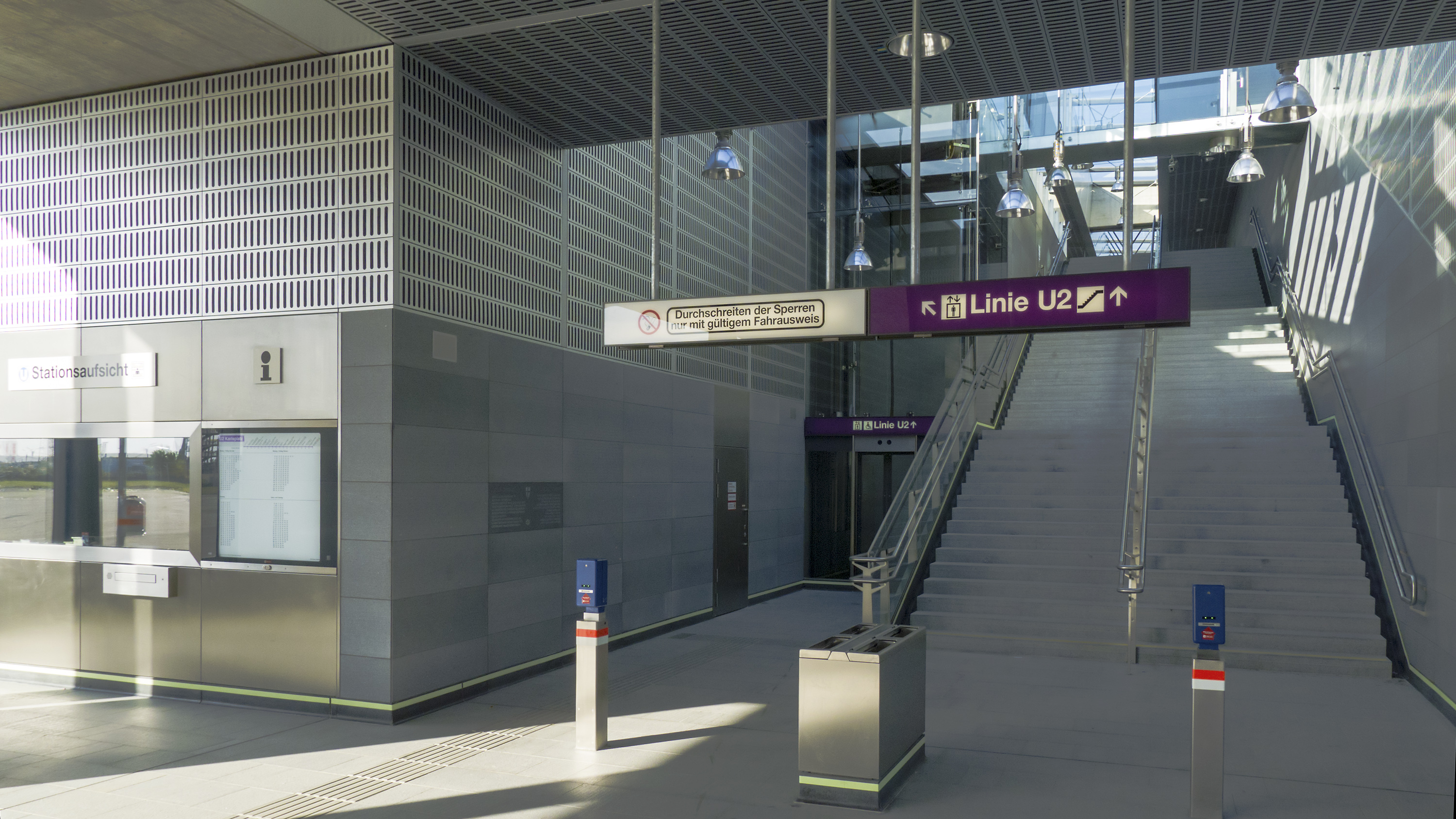
Southern interior

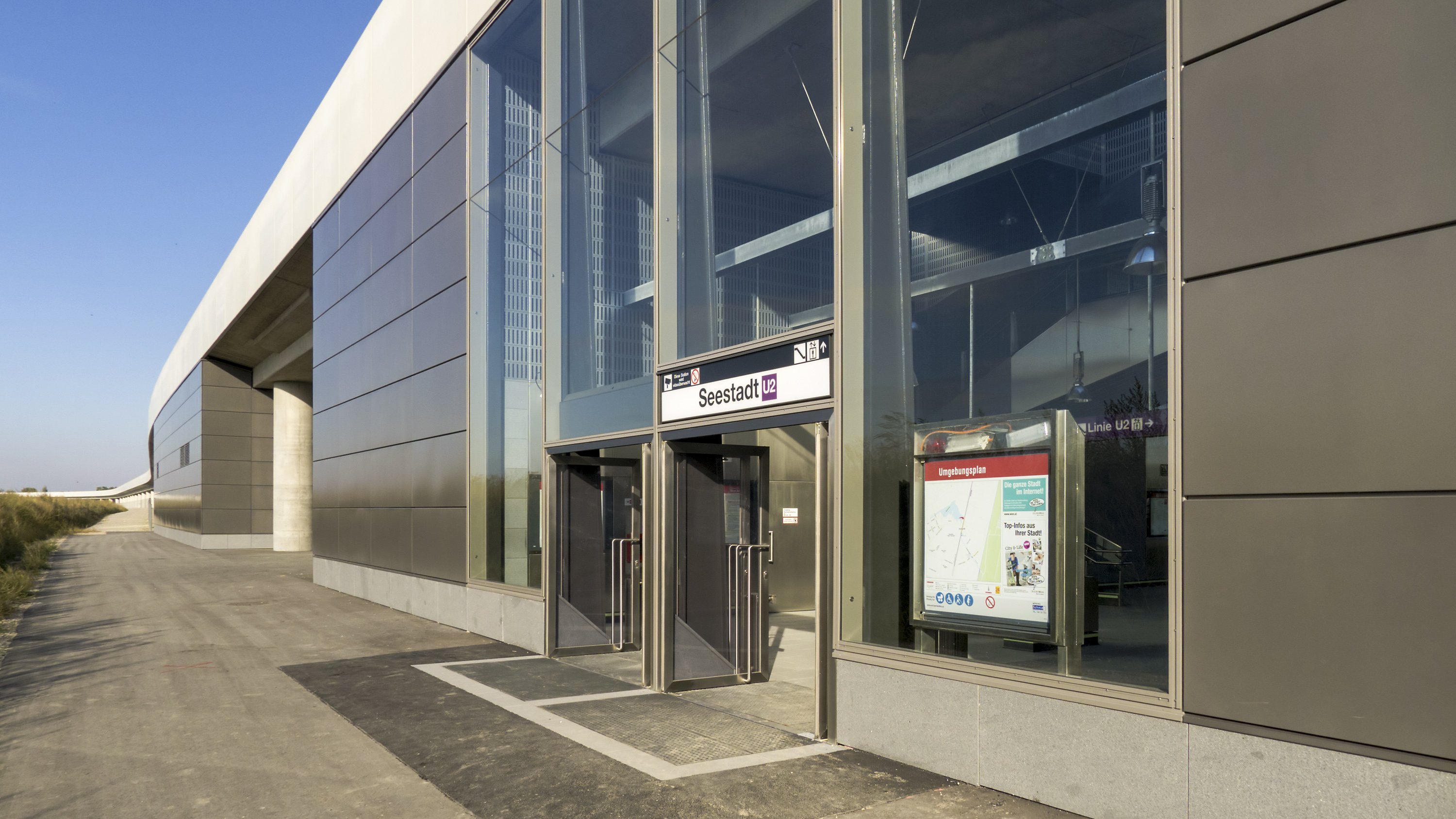
The north entrance

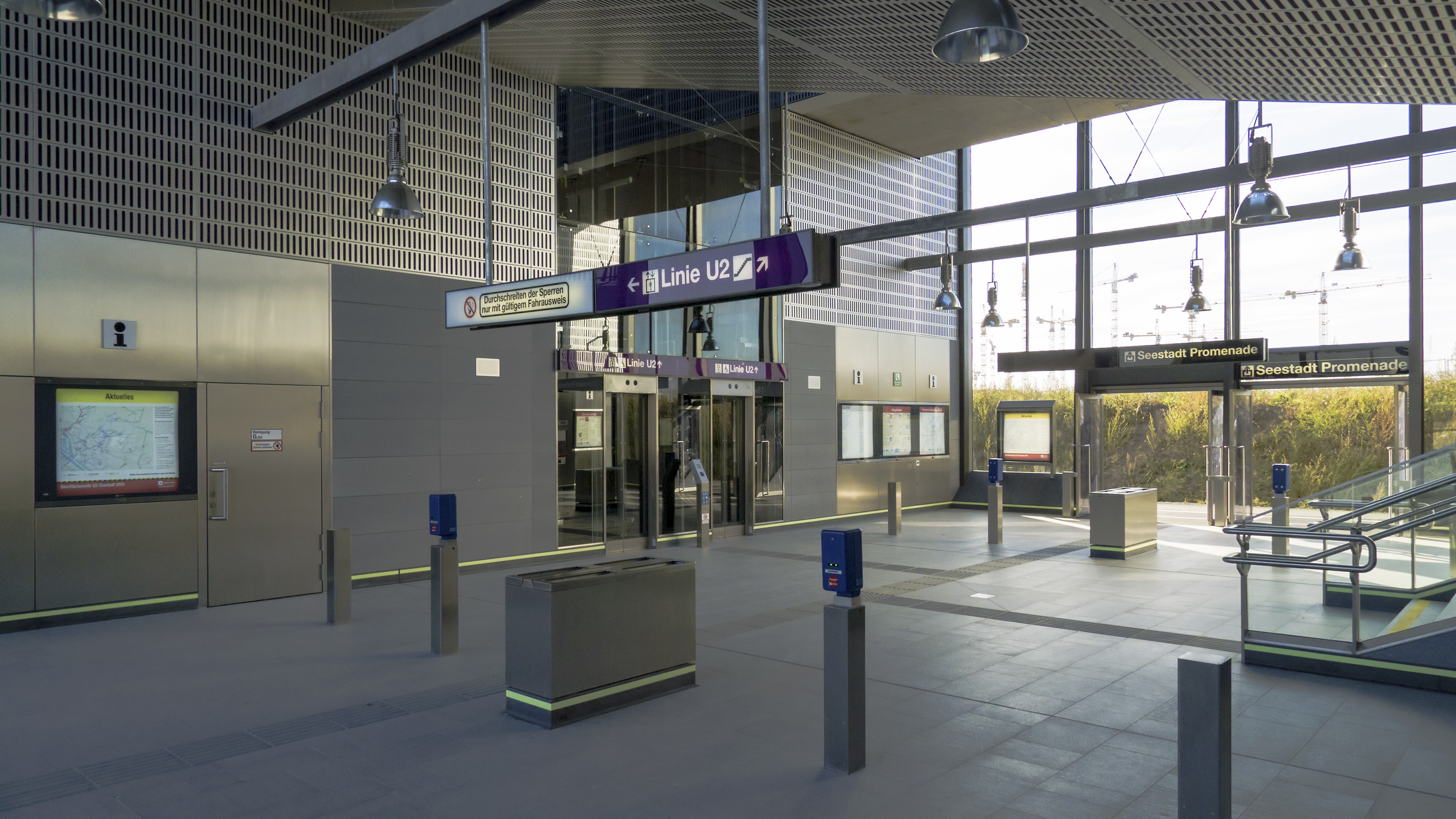
Northern interion

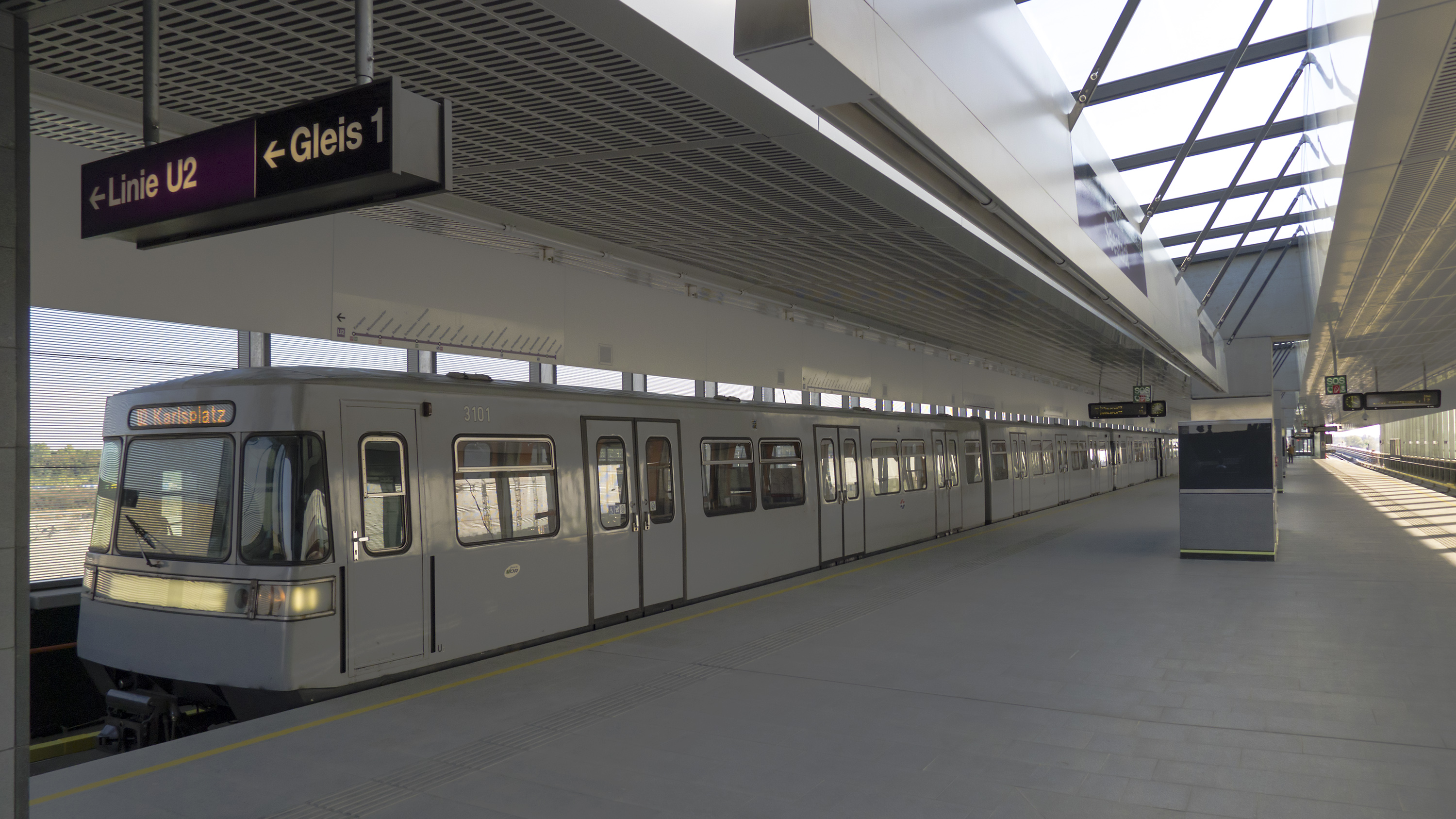
The Platform

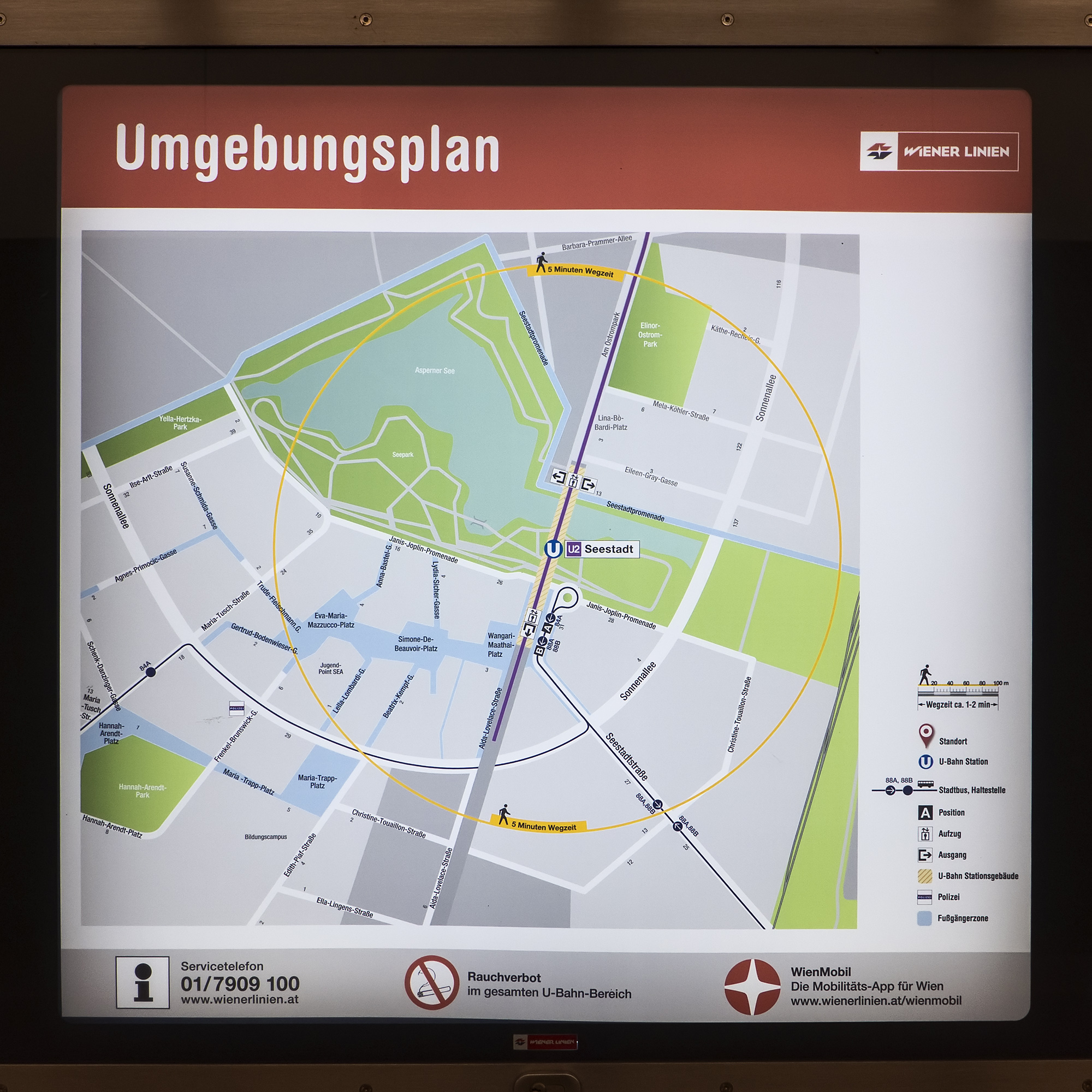
Map of the area
