= Wien-Aspern Airport =

Former airport of Vienna, Austria (1912–1977)

Wien-Aspern Airport Flugplatz Aspern
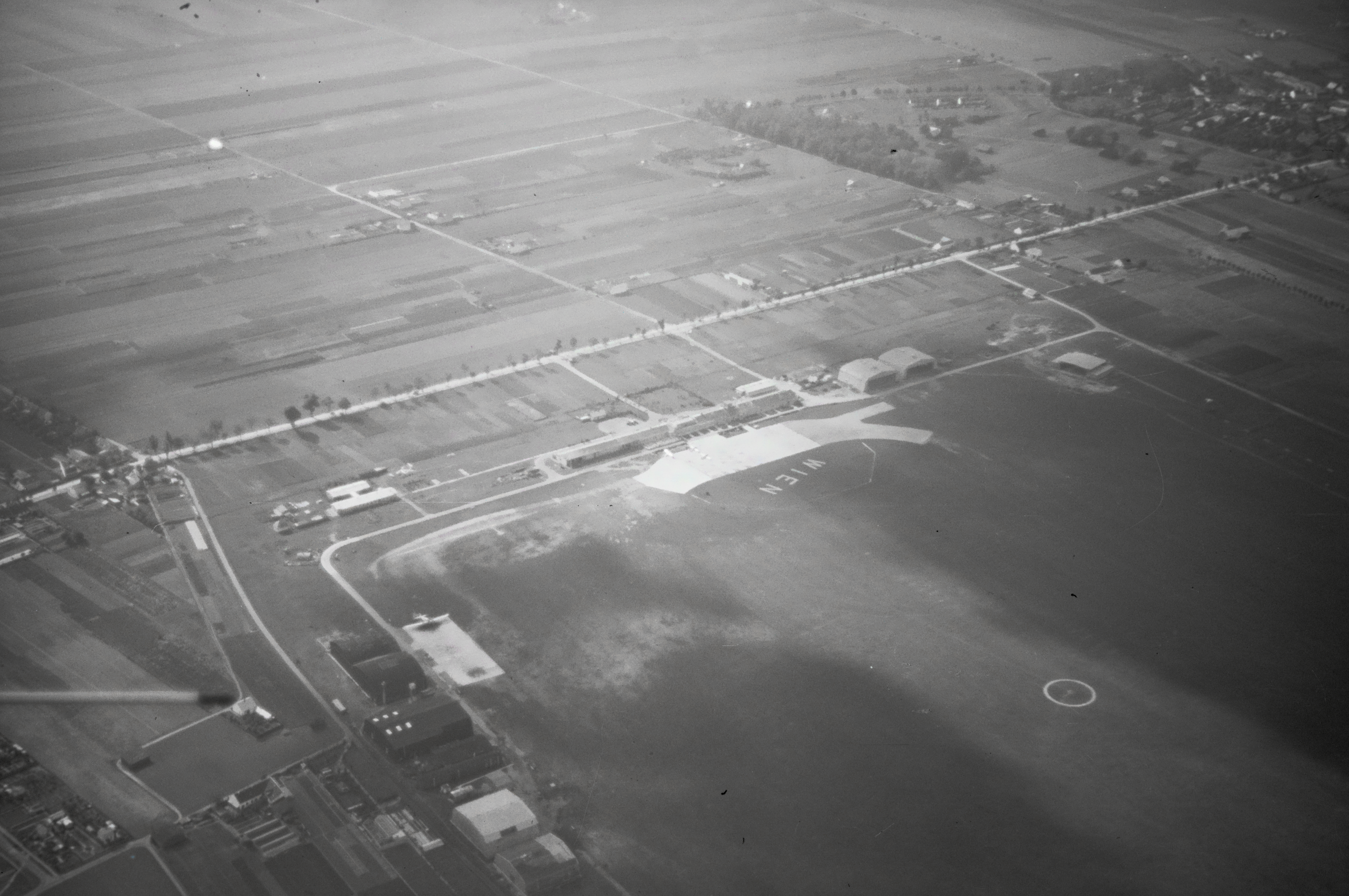
- IATA: none; ICAO: LOWA

Summary
- Airport type: Defunct
- Serves: Vienna
- Location: Aspern, Donaustadt district in Austria
- Opened: 23 June 1912
- Closed: 30 April 1977
- Coordinates: 48°13′29″N 16°30′30″E

Map
- Location in Austria

Runways
Direction	Length		Surface
Direction	ft	m	Surface
09/27		760	Concrete
13/31		1,200	Concrete
18/36		700	Concrete

Wien-Aspern Airport (ICAO: LOWA) was an airport in Aspern, Vienna, Austria. It was established on 23 June 1912, and operated until closure on 30 April 1977. Throughout its history, it was used by the Austro-Hungarian Air Force during World War I, Luftwaffe during the Anschluss in World War II, and the Soviet Air Forces during Red Army occupation in the 1950s.

== History ==
Wien-Aspern Airport was built on 23 June 1912 as the largest airport in Europe. It opened with an international flight meeting, which saw over 100,000 spectators and 6,000 automobiles. From 15 to 22 June 1913, the second International Flight Meeting took place in Wien-Aspern Airport. The event was attended by Emperor Franz Joseph I as the highest guest on the Day of the Air Fleet, and future Empress of Austria Zita of Bourbon-Parma, was also present during the flying competitions.

After the assassination of the Austrian heir to the throne, civil aviation ceased. It became the pilot training ground for the Austrian Austro-Hungarian Air Force, and was also used to test aircraft build by Esslingen aircraft manufacturer Aviatik. In 1918, an airmail service was established, connecting Kiev and Odessa to Aspern. When World War I ended in 1919, the airfield was ordered to be destroyed under the Treaty of Saint-Germain-en-Laye. However, in 1922, Wien-Aspern Airport fell under ownership of the Federal Ministry of Trade and Transport, reopening international routes to the airport. By the mid-1920s, the airfield received expansions and was rightly referred to as an airport. On April 27, 1925, the first scheduled flight between Vienna and Poland took place with Junkers F-13 operated by Polish airline LOT. On 12 July 1931, airship LZ 127 "Graf Zeppelin" visited Aspern Airport, which attracted tens of thousands of onlookers and politicians. In 1937, Austrian military pilots demonstrated their skills during an air show, which also attracted large crowds of onlookers.

=== World War II ===
During the Anschluss of 12 March 1938, the airfield was immediately converted for military use. The airfield was operated by the Luftwafte, and was heavily fortified with bunkers, blast walls, anti-air positions, and hangars. After April 1938, the Germans constructed 3 concrete hangars, a paved hangar apron, paved taxiways, new aprons, and new hangars. The airfield was equipped with a fully illuminated field, a searchlight, and a beam approach system. It became the main hub for flights to and from the Balkans. DLH workshops and permanent offices of the National Weather Service were based there. Infrastructure included 11 hangars, 4 large and 3 medium hardstands in the southwest corner, 1 large double-bay, 1 large, and 1 medium hardstands in the southeast corner. Facilities included separate workshop buildings, fire station, motor pool, and garages in the southwest corner, while there were station admin offices, flight control, dispensary, and canteens in the southern boundary behind the hangars. Station facilities included technical and administrative offices, officers’ quarters, barracks, messes, canteens, station HQ, and stores buildings. There also was a radio training school housed in wooden huts behind the southwestern hangars. Most of these facilities were built with brick. The centre of the airport was spared from bombing, as Allied bombers mainly targeted the Air Force base and the nearby refinery in Lobau. On 15 February 1944, the Fifteenth Air Force bombed the airfield, leaving the landing area heavily cratered and unserviceable by aircraft. From 3–5 April 1945, the infrastructure was demolished by the Germans and the airfield was evacuated as Soviet soldiers began surrounding Vienna. The airfield was severely damaged by Allied bombing, and was captured by the Red Army in April 1945.

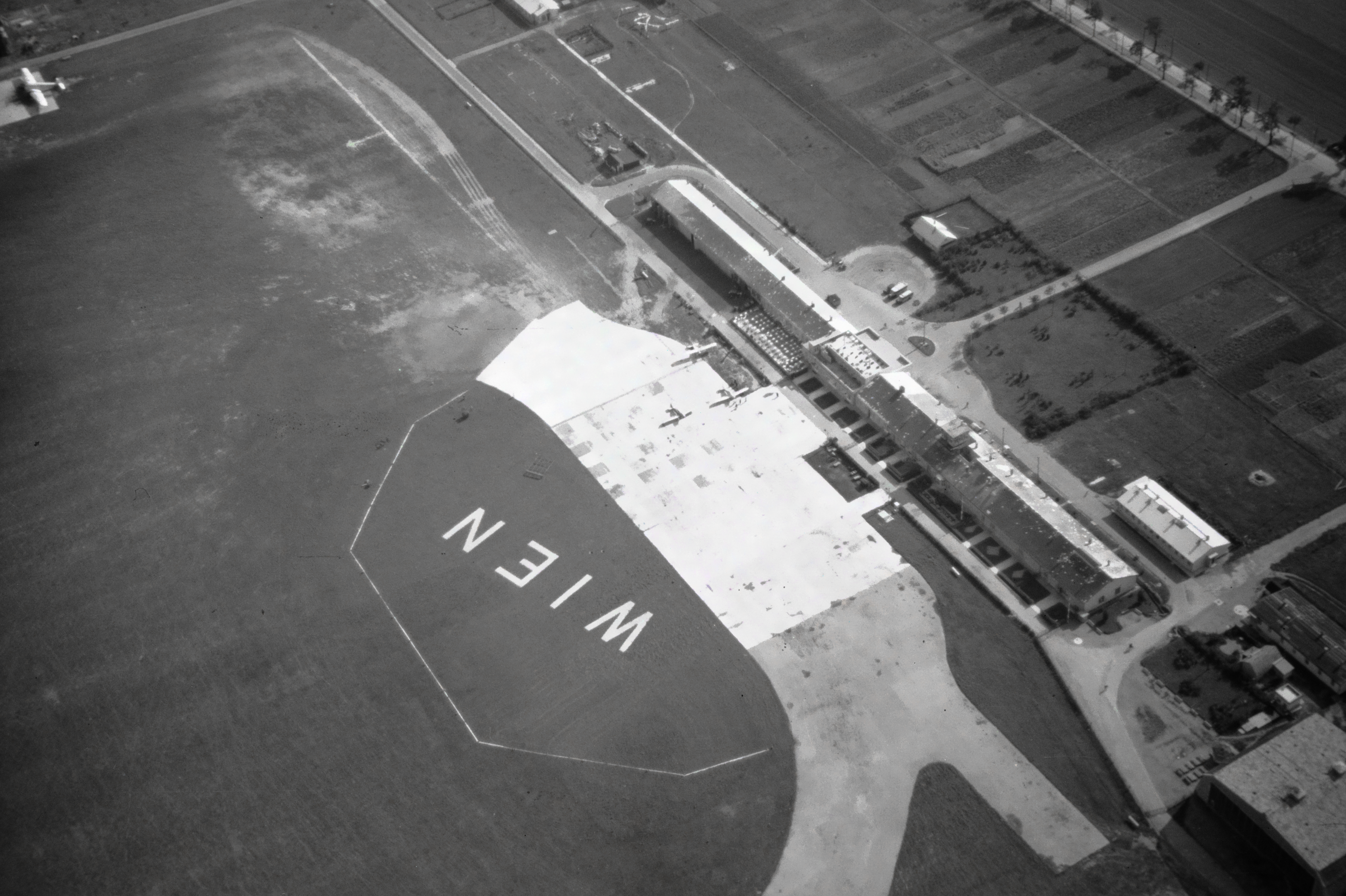
Aerial photograph of Wien-Aspern Airport in August 1934.

=== Units ===
The following are the Luftwaffe units that were based in Wien-Aspern Airport from 1938 to 1945:

Operational Units

- I. Gruppe, Jagdgeschwader 138, April 1938 - October 1938
- I. Gruppe, Jagdgeschwader 134, November 1938 - April 1939
- I. Gruppe, Jagdgeschwader 76, May 1939 - August 1939
- Flight Detachment, Air Fleet 4, 1939 - June 1941
- Wekusta 76 (Meteorological Reconnaissance Squadron), June 1939 - August 1939, circa April 1940 - May 1941
- Sanitäts-Flugbereitschaft 17 (Medical Flight Detachment 17), March 1941 - May 1942, April 1945
- II. Gruppe, Kampfgeschwader 4, April 1941
- 4.(H)/Aufklärungsgruppe 12 (4th Heavy Reconnaissance Group 12), May 1941
- Wetterflugstelle Wien-Aspern (Weather Flight Station Vienna-Aspern), circa June 1941 - 1945
- III. Gruppe, Kampfgeschwader 55, August 1941 - September 1941
- I. Gruppe, Kampfgeschwader 55, October 1941 - November 1941
- Überführungskommando, Luftzeuggruppe 17 (Aircraft Ferrying Command, Air Equipment Group 17), 1942
- Staff, Jagdgeschwader 27, December 1942 - February 1943
- II. Gruppe, Jagdgeschwader 27, January 1943 - February 1943
- II. Gruppe, Kampfgeschwader 54, May 1943 - October 1943
- Staff, 5th Gruppe Südost, Flugzeugüberführungsgeschwader 1 (Aircraft Ferrying Wing 1), August 1943 - 1944
- Staff, Jagdgeschwader 77, September 1944

School Units

- BFS Wien-Aspern (Bomber Flight School Vienna-Aspern), November 1939 - January 1940
- BFS 4 (Bomber Flight School 4), January 1940 - April 1941

Station Commands

- Fliegerhorst/Flugplatz Wien-Aspern (Air Base Vienna-Aspern), to March 1944
- Fliegerhorst-Kommandantur A(o) 4/XVII (Air Base Command A(o) 4/XVII), April 1944 - April 1945

Kommandants

- Kommandant: Hauptmann Arthur van Aken-Quesar, February 1940 ?
- Kommandant: Oberst Karl Glotz ?, January 1943 ?

Station Units

- Koflug Wien-Aspern (Command Flight Unit Vienna-Aspern), July 1939 - March 1941
- Koflug 2/XVII (Command Flight Unit 2/XVII), April 1941 - circa October 1941
- Werft-Abteilung (0) 21/XVII (Maintenance Detachment 0, 21/XVII), 1944 - 1945
- Werft-Kompanie 33 (Maintenance Company 33)
- 4./schwere Flak-Abteilung 807 (4th Battery, Heavy Anti-Aircraft Battalion 807), to July 1944
- Heimat-Flak-Batterie 36/XVII (Home Anti-Aircraft Battery 36/XVII), 1944 - 1945
- 8./Flugsicherungs-Regiment Reich (8th Company, Air Traffic Control Regiment Reich), 1944 - 1945
- Luftnachrichten-Flugsicherungshauptstelle 38 (Air Signal/Air Traffic Main Station 38), 1944 - 1945

== Red Army Occupation ==
During the Red Army occupation, Wien-Aspern Airport primarily operated as a bomber base. During November 1954, aircraft such as the Soviet Mikoyan-Gurevich MiG-15 took off and landed daily. Wien-Aspern Airfield was equipped with a mobile flight control station, a VHF antenna on the roof of the barracks building, and a radio installation located 20 meters east of the outer landing beacon. There also was a long-wire antenna, which had been dismantled by 16 November 1954. There was one Soviet fighter regiment and one bomber regiment operating 34 Petlyakov Pe-2s assigned to the airfield. It was reported that the bomber regiment was either brought up to strength, or a second regiment had been activated.

=== Units ===
The following are the Soviet units that were based in Wien-Apern during the Red Army occupation:

- 654th Guards Bomber Aviation Regiment, July 1945 - September 1948, equipped with Petlyakov Pe-2
- 749th & 819th Guards Bomber Aviation Regiments of the 164th Guards Bomber Aviation Division, July 1945 - January 1952, equipped with Petlyakov Pe-2.
- 2444th Aviation Technical Battalion, 1951
- Artillery Battalion (attached to regiment), 1951
- Mobile Aviation Repair Workshops (Podrizhnye Aviatsionnye Remontnye Masterskiye), 1951

== Public Flying ==
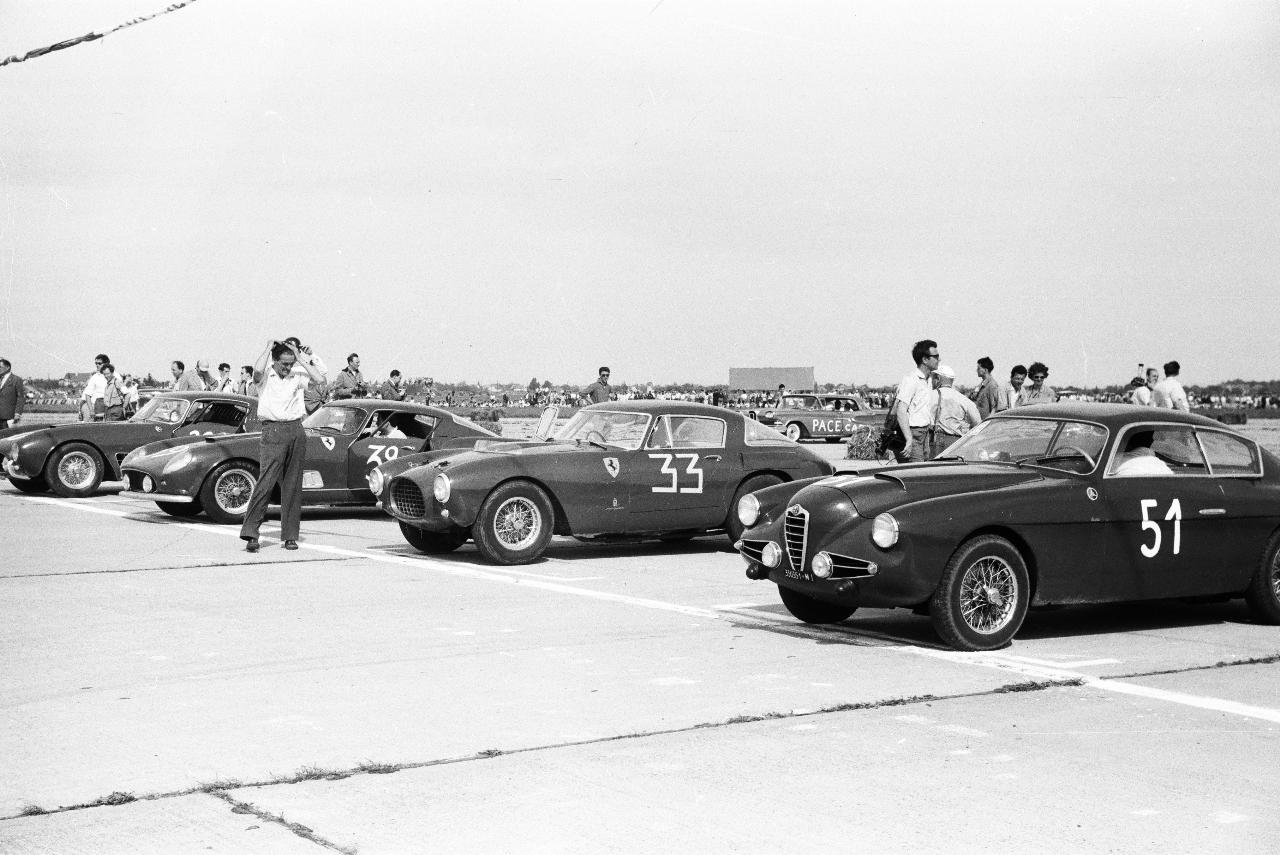
Wien-Aspern circuit prior to a race.

After the occupation by the Red Army ended in 1955, the airfield was taken over by the Austrian Aero-Club. Various aviation activities such as pilot training, parachuting, and gliding were held there. From 1966 to 1977, races were occasionally held on the runways, drawing large attention from the town of Aspern. The track was named Flugpatz Aspern Circuit. The track length was 2,600 meters, had 8 curves, and there was 26 starters.

=== Closure ===
Due to the expansion of runway 16/34 at Vienna Schwechat Airport, the airfield became an obstruction to the approaching zone. This would lead the closure of Wien-Aspern Airport. Shortly before closure, another festival was held on the airport. The last aircraft took off on April 30, 1977, dragging a black flag behind to mark the end of Wien-Aspern Airport.

In 1980, the airfield remained unused until the construction of the General Motors plant (Opel Austria) began, becoming operation by 1982. The disused runways were used by the ARBÖ automobile club as a driving course for traffic training until 2008. In 1997, a commemorative air show organized by the Motorflugunion Klosterneuburg was held. Various airplanes, helicopters, and ultralights gathered at the former airport. Led by veteran pilot Gustav Holdosi, a section of runway 18/36 was restored for the event. The event lasted two weeks, and was the final aviation event at Aspern.

=== Redevelopment ===
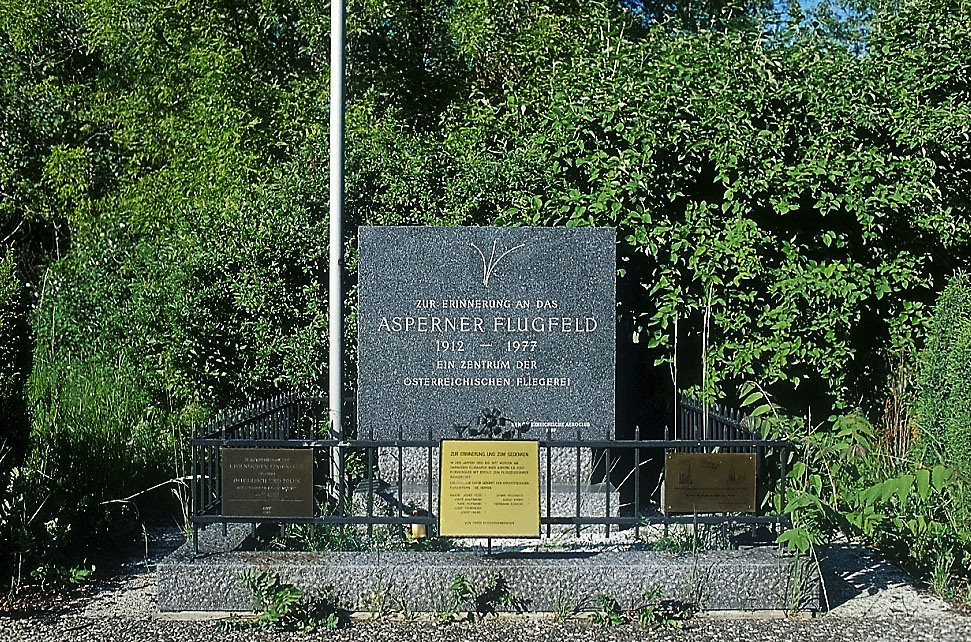
Commemorative plaque for Wien-Aspern Airport

Officials sought land for re-development, and Wien-Aspern Airport was considered. In 2005, an architectural competition was announced, and plans to build 8,000 apartments 7,500 industrial jobs, and 18,000 office jobs were made. A stone memorial plaque was built on the old access road to commemorate the airport's history. In 2007, construction began as the plan was approved by the Vienna City Council. It was one of Europe's largest urban development projects, and construction initiated in 2010, encompassing over 240 hectares for more than 25,000 residents and over 20,000 jobs. The expansion of the Vienna S-Bahn also took place over the former airfield, along with the establishment of Wien-Aspern Nord Station.
