= List of museums in Lower Austria =

This list of museums in the state of Lower Austria, Austria contains museums which are defined for this context as institutions (including nonprofit organizations, government entities, and private businesses) that collect and care for objects of cultural, artistic, scientific, or historical interest and make their collections or related exhibits available for public viewing. Also included are non-profit art galleries and university art galleries.

== The list ==
Name	Image	Location	Type	Summary
Arnulf Rainer Museum		Baden	Art	website, works by contemporary artist Arnulf Rainer
Austrian Motorcycle Museum		Sigmundsherberg	Transportation	website, motorcycles
BAXA Mining Museum		Mannersdorf am Leithagebirge	Mining	information, restored lime kiln and former quarry
Beethoven-Haus Baden		Baden bei Wien	Music	website, about Ludwig van Beethoven, who stayed here while working on his Ninth Symphony
Museum Gugging		Maria Gugging	Art	website works by Gugginger Artists and international art brut
Artstetten Castle		Artstetten-Pöbring	Biography	Life and times of Archduke Franz Ferdinand of Austria
Bicycle Museum of Retz		Retz	Transportation	website, bicycles
Burg Kreuzenstein		Leobendorf	Historic house	Restored medieval castle
Burg Rappottenstein		Rappottenstein	Historic house	Tours of the medieval fortress castle
Burg Seebenstein		Seebenstein	Historic house	Tours of the medieval fortress castle
Burgruine Aggstein		Schönbühel-Aggsbach	Historic house	Tours of the medieval castle ruins
City Museum Wienertor		Hainburg an der Donau	Local	website, local history, prehistory, natural history
City Museum Traiskirchen		Traiskirchen	Local	website, local history, home life, culture
Das Heizhaus		Strasshof an der Nordbahn	Railway	website
District Folklore Museum Lilienfeld		Lilienfeld	Local	website
Dorfmuseum Kritzendorf		Klosterneuburg	Local	website, village history, agriculture, domestic life
Edmund Adler Gallery		Mannersdorf am Leithagebirge	Art	website, municipal art gallery, works by local painter Edmund Adler
Egon Schiele Museum		Tulln an der Donau	Art	Works by painter Egon Schiele, contemporary art exhibits
Eisenbahnmuseum Schwechat		Schwechat	Railway	website
Essl Museum		Klosterneuburg	Art	website, contemporary art
Field and Industrial Railway Museum		Hohenberg	Railway	website
Fire Museum Perchtoldsdorf		Perchtoldsdorf	Firefighting	website, firefighting equipment, helmets, hoses
First Austrian Museum of Everyday History		Pölla	History	information, rural life and social changes of Lower Austria
Fischamend Museum		Fischamend	Local	website, local history, prehistory, industry, culture
Forest Farm Museum		Gutenstein	History	website, woodworking, carpentry, tools, uses
Gallery of Lower Austria for Contemporary Art Krems		Krems	Art	website
Gallery of Lower Austria for Contemporary Art St. Pölten		St. Pölten	Art	website
Galerie Stadtpark		Krems	Art	website
Gaming Charterhouse		Gaming	Religious	Features museum in the former monastery's history and medieval life
Göttweig Abbey		Göttweig	Religious	Includes tours of the Baroque monastery complex and imperial museum
Gozzoburg		Krems	Art	website, tours of the Medieval hall with frescoes
Grocery Museum		Herrnbaumgarten	History	website, late 19th-century period general store
Haydn's birthplace in Rohrau		Rohrau	Biography	Late 18th-century period birthplace of composer Joseph Haydn
Höbarthmuseum		Horn	Multiple	website, local history, weapons, watches and clocks
Hungarian Tower City Museum		Bruck an der Leitha	Local	website
Karikaturmuseum Krems		Krems	Art	website, caricature, cartoon, comic and satirical art
Kitchen Museum		Herrnbaumgarten	History	website, period kitchen displays, cookware and serving pieces
Klosterneuburg Monastery		Klosterneuburg	Art	Tours of the monastery and museum of religious art
Klosterneuburg City Museum		Klosterneuburg	Local	website, local history
Krahuletz Museum		Eggenburg	Multiple	website, minerals and fossils, archaeological and ethnographic artifacts
Kunsthalle Krems		Krems	Art	website, exhibits of art, photography, culture
Landesgalerie Niederösterreich		Krems	Art	website, exhibits of art
Little Train Museum		Altenmarkt an der Triesting	Railway	Model railroads, open by appointment
Loisium		Langenlois	Wine	website, area winemaking
Lower Austria Museum		St. Pölten	Multiple	Local history, art, natural history
Mannersdorf City Museum		Mannersdorf am Leithagebirge	Local	website, local history, archaeology, geology
Michelstetten School Museum		Michelstetten	Education	website, 19th-century period school
Moravian Silesian Heritage Museum		Klosterneuburg	Ethnic	website, decorative art and culture of the Sudeten Germans
Museum Carnuntinum		Bad Deutsch-Altenburg	Open-air	Exhibits important archaeological finds from the ancient city Carnuntum
Museum Kierling		Kierling	Local	website, local history, collection of silhouettes, kitchen items and cookbooks, horse-drawn vehicles and farm implements
Museum Krems		Krems	Multiple	website, city's history, culture. art collection
Museum of Flight Aviaticum		Wiener Neustadt	Aviation	website, Austrian history of aviation
Museum of Historical Beer Mugs		Hainfeld	Decorative arts	website, collection of beer mugs
Museum Retz		Retz	Local	website, local history, musical instruments,
Museumsdorf Niedersulz		Sulz im Weinviertel	Open-air	Features over 80 historic buildings, includes the Anabaptist Museum
Museumszentrum Mistelbach		Mistelbach	Multiple	website, includes the Hermann Nitsch Museum, art, wine
Nonseum		Herrnbaumgarten		website, audited classics of nonsense
Open Air Museum Petronell		Petronell-Carnuntum	Open-air	website, reconstructions of Ancient Roman houses from Carnuntum
Pleyel Museum		Großweikersdorf	Music	website, birthplace of the composer Ignaz Pleyel, dedicated to his life and work
Railway Museum Sigmundsberg		Sigmundsherberg	Railway	website
Reckturm		Wiener Neustadt	Military	information, private collection of weapons
Rohrau Castle		Rohrau	Art	Historic castle with fine painting collection
Rollettmuseum		Baden	Multiple	website, science, natural history, archaeology
Rosenburg		Rosenburg-Mold	Historic house	
Schallaburg Renaissance Castle		Schallaburg	Historic house	
Schloss Eckartsau		Eckartsau	Historic house	website, Baroque period castle
Schloss Hof			Historic house	Imperial palace and gardens
Schloss Weitra		Weitra	Multiple	website, includes exhibits about the castle's history, art, regional economic history, brewery museum, area political history from 1945 to the end of the Cold War
Schloss Laxenburg		Laxenburg	Historic house	Includes Franzensburg, several imperial palaces and gardens
Schönberg House in Mödling		Mödling	Biography	Home of composer Arnold Schoenberg
Schwechat Museum		Schwechat	Local	website, local history, culture
Seegrotte		Hinterbrühl	Mining	Former gypsum mine and cave system with large underground lake
Tower Museum in the Cathedral		Wiener Neustadt		information
Vino Versum Poysdorf		Poysdorf	Wine	www.vinoversum.at, exhibition about wine and history
Waldviertel Art Museum		Schrems	Art	website, exhibits of paintings, sculptures, architecture and design by artists from Austria and abroad, sculpture park
Wiener Neustadt City Museum		Wiener Neustadt	Multiple	website, history, culture, science
Wiener Neustadt Hospital Museum		Wiener Neustadt	Medical	information
Wiener Neustadt Industrial District Museum		Wiener Neustadt	History	website, depiction of everyday work using tools, machines and photos
Wiener Neustadt Mineral Museum		Wiener Neustadt	Geology	information
Wienerwaldmuseum		Eichgraben	Multiple	website, minerals and fossils, archaeological and ethnographic artifacts, artisan tools, farming equipment, art gallery
Windmill of Retz		Retz	Mill	website, working windmill and restaurant
Zdarsky Ski Museum		Lilienfeld	Sport	website, history of alpine skiing and work of ski pioneer Mathias Zdarsky
