= Heinrich Maier =

Austrian Roman Catholic priest (1908–1945)

The Reverend Heinrich Maier
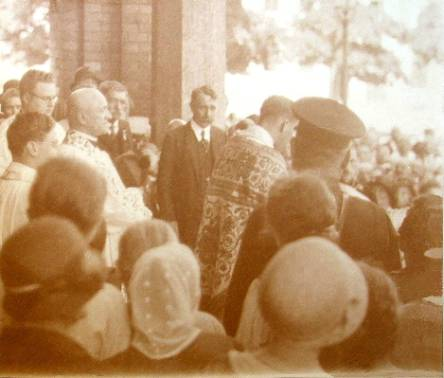
- Maier (in chasuble) in 1932, blessing parishioners
- Born: 16 February 1908; Großweikersdorf, Austria-Hungary
- Died: 22 March 1945 (aged 37); Vienna, Nazi Germany
- Known for: Resistance member

Ecclesiastical career
- Ordained: Roman Catholic Church

Heinrich Maier (German: [ˈhaɪnʁɪç ˈmaɪɐ]; 16 February 1908 – 22 March 1945) was an Austrian Roman Catholic priest, pedagogue, philosopher and a member of the Austrian resistance, who was executed as the last victim of Hitler's regime in Vienna.

The resistance group he led is considered to be one of the most important for the Allies during World War II.

== Early life ==
Heinrich Maier was born on 16 February 1908 at Großweikersdorf. His father, also named Heinrich Maier, was an official on the Imperial Royal Austrian State Railways. His mother Katharina Maier, born Giugno (apparently from the Italian-speaking part of Austria-Hungary), was the daughter of a policeman. His sister was born in 1910 near Gmünd. His sister was educated by his grandmother and his aunt in Moravia. He received strong financial support from his relative Gabriele Maier.

His early education was at a Volksschule. He was then sent to a Gymnasium in Sankt Pölten between 1918 and 1923. Maier then went to a Gymnasium in Leoben from 1923 to 1926. He did his theological degree at the University of Vienna (1926–1928). Before continuing his studies at Collegium Germanicum et Hungaricum (1928–1930) and the University of Vienna. The subject of his dissertation was "The struggle for the correct concept of church in the late Middle Ages. Represented using Marsilius of Padua's Defensor Pacis and Torquemada's Summa de Ecclesia". As part of his dissertation, he dealt with the then explosive topic, the relationship between state and church.

During his time as an active student, he became a member of the K.Ö.St.V. Nibelungia im ÖCV. His student name was "Wolf". It was the only ÖCV student association loyal to the Habsburg Kaiser (Emperor) in the interwar period, whose “patron” was Otto von Habsburg, the last crown prince of Austria-Hungary.

Maier worked as a priest in Schwarzau, Reichenau, Mödling and later in Gersthof, a part of Währing in Vienna.

== Youth group chaplain ==
Heinrich Maier was chaplain of a Scout group of the Österreichisches Pfadfinderkorps St.Georg, the Catholic Austrian Scout association between 1926 and 1938 in Austria, in Vienna.

He was also a chaplain of the altar boys and the Präses of the Marianischen Kinderkongregation, a youth group of the Christian life community.

== Opposition to Nazism ==
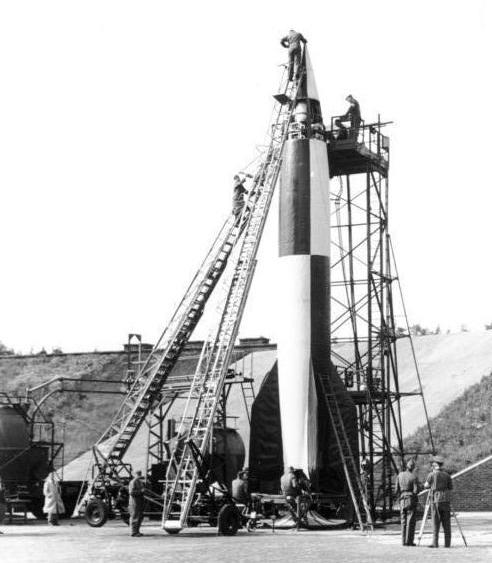
Heinrich Maier and his group helped the allies to fight the V-2, which was produced by concentration camp prisoners.

Maier, "impressed" with charisma and enthusiasm, had a high level of intelligence and scientifically sound training, was interested in art and politics and felt deeply connected to his home country. Enthusiastic contact, coupled with a warm and open personality, made many friendships open to him across all social classes; however, he paid special attention to the care and upbringing of children and adolescents to independent and mature personalities; "dealing with them was uncomplicated and comradely [...]" According to contemporary witnesses, Maier was "a real buddy", "a happy person" and an "accurate soccer player".

With the abolition of religious instruction by the Nazi regime, Maier also lost his job as a religion teacher at the Albertus Magnus School in Vienna Währing in 1938, but remained a chaplain in the parish of Gersthof-St. Leopold in Vienna, Währing, deepened his theological studies and received his doctorate in July 1942 (second doctorate - theology). He then violated the orders of his ecclesiastical authorities in that he not only acted "purely as a pastoral" but also politically.

Maier was very involved in the resistance against the Nazi Party. Maier had been actively involved in the idea of resistance since 1940 and saw himself as a priest committed to it. His Christian faith and his humanistic worldview forced him to take action, against the advice of his superiors, against Nazism. As early as May and June 1940, he contacted resistance groups around Jakob Kaiser, Felix Hurdes, Lois Weinberger, Adolf Schärf and Karl Seitz. Out of his conviction, the Catholic faith and Austrian patriotism, he was a resistance fighter who ultimately did not rule out militant means to suppress the Nazi regime. He founded the resistance group Maier-Messner-Caldonazzi together with the Tyrolean Catholic-monarchist resistance fighter Walter Caldonazzi from Mals in South Tyrol and later from Kramsach in North Tyrol, who already led a resistance group with a few hundred members in Tyrol with the policeman Andreas Hofer (a direct descendant of the Tyrolean freedom hero of the same name, Andreas Hofer), and Franz Josef Messner, the Tyrolean director of the Semperit works. It was Maier who brought the very different members of the resistance group together and was able to build on a large network of his contacts. This Catholic Conservative group is called "perhaps the most spectacular single group of the Austrian resistance." The aim of the group was to bring about an end to the horrific regime by military defeat as soon as possible and to re-establish a free and democratic Austria. Maier advocated the following principle: "Every bomb that falls on armaments factories shortens the war and spares the civilian population."

The group (also called CASSIA or Maier-Messner group - opposite the OSS, the resistance group called itself the Austrian Committee of Liberation - the Americans codenamed Arcel using the acronym ACL) took care, among other things, of collecting and passing on information about locations, employees and productions about Nazi armaments factories to the Allies. This information for targeted bombing by the Allies was partly passed on to middlemen in Switzerland to the British and Americans. Heinrich Maier stated, in the interrogation of the group's strategy on 27 April 1944, that he had hoped to prevent further air strikes on Austrian cities by providing information about the "armaments factories in the Ostmark" and "that this would prevent the other industries that we had after the war absolutely needed, and the civilian population was spared. [...] Shortly thereafter, I familiarised Dr. Messner with my plan and talked to him about which armament centers we wanted to reveal to the enemy powers' (– such as Steyr, Wiener Neudorf and Wiener Neustadt) eye." Via Walter Caldonazzi, the group had contacts with Italian resistance groups through Italian construction workers.

The exact drawings of the V-2 rocket, the production of the Tiger tank and Messerschmitt Bf 109 and others could be passed on via Maier's relationship with the Commandant of Vienna, Heinrich "Rico" Stümpfl. Lieutenant General Stümpfl, a former officer of the Austro-Hungarian Army and Austrian Army, knew about the activities of the resistance group and was always ready to help them comprehensively. As a result, precise location sketches and production figures for steel mills, weapons, ball bearings and the German production situation for synthetic rubber (Buna) and aircraft factories soon reached Allied general staffs. Maier's saying, based on Shakespeare's Richard III, "A kingdom for a ball bearing" has come down to us in this regard. Via Walter Caldonazzi, there were contacts to numerous armaments factories in Tyrol, such as the Heinkel factories in Jenbach, where drive components for the Messerschmitt Me 163 Komet and V-2 rockets were manufactured. The information about the aircraft factory in Wiener Neustadt, the most important and largest German factory for the production of fighter aircraft at the time, was particularly important.

In some cases, Maier had received information from front-line soldiers on leave about the industrial facilities. American and British bombers were able to strike armaments factories such as the secret V-rocket factory (V-1 and V-2) in Peenemünde and the Messerschmitt plants near Vienna. These contributions by the resistance group via the defense industry and production sites (crucial for the Operation Crossbow and Operation Hydra, both preliminary missions for Operation Overlord) were later to prove to be 92% correct and were thus an effective contribution to Allied warfare. On the one hand, the Allies were able to target the arms industry and on the other hand, this information and the subsequent air strikes decisively weakened the supply of the German Air Force, which together also had the effect of shortening the war. In this regard, it is often stated that if the war against Nazi Germany had lasted longer, the first atomic bomb would have been used over Berlin or the industrial centers of Ludwigshafen am Rhein and Mannheim.

Messner provided the first information about the mass murder of Jews from his Semperit plant near Auschwitz - a message the enormity of which amazed the Americans in Zurich. However, the Maier-Messner-Caldonazzi resistance group's plan to bring an American transmitter of the Office of Strategic Services (OSS) from Liechtenstein to Austria failed. In 1943 the British Special Operations Executive (SOE) was in contact with the Austrian resistance group through an SOE officer in Istanbul, G. E. R. Gedye, but Gedye was not convinced of the reliability of the group’s local contact person, Semperit-Istanbul branch director Gustav Rüdiger (sometimes incorrectly identified as “Franz Josef Riediger”) and, because of these security concerns, decided not to cooperate with the group.

In addition to establishing contact with Allied secret services, the resistance group also tried to educate its own countrymen in order to prepare them politically for a future peace order. To this end, a central committee or preparatory groups in the event of a collapse of the German Reich and a future independent state of Germany with a monarchical form of government were planned, which, in addition to Austria, should also include Bavaria and South Tyrol.

Helene Sokal and her later husband, the chemist Theodor Legradi, who had international connections to the communist resistance, among others, included the doctor Josef Wyhnal and the student Hermann Klepell. Klepell had relationships with socialist circles, while another member, the communist Pawlin, made connections with the KPÖ. Since Maier grew up in poor circumstances, he was very open to social issues. In the summer of 1942, the resistance group was able to send a "memorandum" drawn up by Maier, Sokal and Legradi to the Allies (addressed to the British and Soviet Foreign Ministers), in which a current social analysis, military and economic information and the goals of a new Austria were presented. The reception was confirmed by the BBC, but not by the Soviets.

Maier and Hofer also planned the arming and liberation of prisoners of war and Hofer and Caldonazzi distributed feverish drugs to Wehrmacht or SS soldiers who were subjected to a military investigation or who did not want to be drafted into the Wehrmacht. By injecting such substances - including Hofer himself - he tried to keep himself from being drafted back into the army. Maier had to pay hush money to influence some people around him so that they would not betray him to the Gestapo.

Leaflets were written in which Hitler was described as the "traitor of the German people" or "greatest curse-laden criminal of all time" and militarism as "the shame of our century". The leaflets also say, "Only a maniac or criminal like Hitler still speaks of victory. The inevitable end is coming. Why sacrifice thousands of people?" or "Hitler, the prisoner of his dreams of fame! The criminal who, because of his ambition, plunges an entire people into the abyss." The transfer of money from the Americans via Istanbul and Budapest to Vienna was also one of the reasons why the group's Gestapo found out.

== Arrest, trial and execution ==
The group around Maier was the special focus of the Gestapo and the Nazi judiciary, especially since the goal of the resistance group, on the one hand, the overthrow of the Nazi regime and on the other hand the restoration of an independent Austria under Habsburg leadership, was a special provocation for the Nazi regime. Hitler hated the Habsburg family and was diametrically opposed to the centuries-old Habsburg principles of "live and let live" in relation to ethnic groups, peoples, minorities, religions, cultures and languages. Some members of the group were gradually arrested in February 1944 after being betrayed. Heinrich Maier was arrested on 28 March 1944 by the Gestapo in his parish in Vienna-Gersthof in the sacristy after the holy mass and taken to the prison in the former Hotel Métropole on Morzinplatz. During the hours of interrogation by the Gestapo, confessions were obtained through torture (according to interrogation protocols: "stated after detailed questioning"). During the Gestapo interrogations, Maier managed on the one hand to conceal the actions of the group and on the other to exonerate the other members. Overall, the Gestapo was unable to uncover the great importance of the resistance group. Maier was later transferred to the police prison house on the Elisabethpromenade (now Rossauer Lände) or on 16 September 1944 to the prison of the Landesgericht I in cell number E 307.

In the secret people's trial on 27 and 28 October 1944, a total of eight death sentences were imposed on Heinrich Maier, Walter Caldonazzi, Franz Josef Messner, Andreas Hofer, Josef Wyhnal, Hermann Klepell, Wilhelm Ritsch and Clemens von Pausinger. The indictment was "preparation for treason" by "participating in a separatist union". The head of the People's Court of Albrecht is said to have asked Maier, because he tried to relieve the other co-defendants, "What do you get if you take the blame of others?", To which he replied "Mr. Counsel, I will probably not need anything anymore!". The judgment of the Volksgerichtshof states that, on the one hand, according to credible statements by the Gestapo officials, no illegal means of force of any kind were used to obtain statements against any inmate, and on the other hand, all attempts by Maier to take the full blame were completely unbelievable. Regarding Maier's motives and thoughts regarding the transmission of information about arms, steel and aircraft factories to the Allies, the Volksgerichtshof stated: "The destruction of weapons manufacturers was intended to hit German armaments production and thereby shorten the war; in addition," independent Austria should "as a result, the industries necessary for peacebuilding are preserved intact and the settlements are spared."

After the conviction, Maier was transferred to the Mauthausen concentration camp on 22 November 1944. He was severely tortured for months before his execution to get more information about the group. The concentration camp guards tied Maier to the window cross of a barracks without clothes, they beat him until he passed out and his body looked more like a lump of meat, but he said nothing. Maier is known in this regard as Miles Christi.

Caldonazzi was beheaded at the Vienna Regional Court in January 1945 and Messner was gassed at the Mauthausen concentration camp in April 1945. On 18 March 1945, Maier was brought back to Vienna together with Leopold Figl, Felix Hurdes and Lois Weinberger. Until his execution, he was used to defuse unexploded bombs and explosive devices in various districts of Vienna. Alfred Missong reports that Maier approached death with a deeply impressive composure. Chaplain Heinrich Maier was beheaded in the Vienna Regional Court on 22 March 1945 at 6.40 p.m.

=== Last words ===
His last words were "Christ the king, lives! Austria lives!" (Es lebe Christus, der König! Es lebe Österreich!)

== Legacy ==
Knowledge of Maier's resistance to the Nazi terror regime was largely suppressed in Austria after the World War II, partly because he acted against the express instructions of his church superiors, partly because his political plans for a Habsburg constitutional monarchy in Central Europe (according to the plans of Winston Churchill) were sharply rejected by Joseph Stalin and the USSR. The Government of Austria is in opposition of restoring Habsburg monarchy as well from 1918. This anti-Habsburg course also became part of the constitution of the Austrian State Treaty of 1955 over the imperative efforts of the USSR.

=== Memorials ===
- 1945: Memorial Grave (Ehrengrab) in Vienna (Friedhof in Neustift am Walde);
- 1949: A street in Vienna is named DDr. Heinrich Maier Straße (DDr.Heinrich Maier Street);
- 1970: Installation of a glass window in the Viennese Votive Church with a scene from the Mauthausen concentration camp, whereby the prisoner with the blessing hand is chaplain Heinrich Maier while hearing a confession next to the death stairs;
- 1988: Commemorative plaque in front of the church Saint Leopold in Vienna;
- 1995: Heinrich Maier Oratorium composed by Gerald Spitzner [Video: http://venite-austria.jimdo.com/heinrich-maier-gedenken/ ];
- 2018: The Viennese student Maria Merz receives a special Pechmann Prize for her work: "Dr. Heinrich Maier – Ein Wiener Geistlicher im Widerstand gegen den Nationalsozialismus".

== Bibliography ==
- Beer, Siegfried [in German] (1993), "»Arcel/Cassia/Redbird«. Die Widerstandsgruppe Maier-Messner und der amerikanische Kriegsgeheimdienst OSS in Bern, Istanbul und Algier 1943/1944" (PDF), Jahrbuch des Dokumentationsarchivs des österreichischen Widerstandes: 75–100
- Exenberger, Herbert [in German] (1986), Antifaschistischer Stadtführer, Wien: Wiener Bildungsausschuß der SPÖ
- Fux, Ildefons Manfred [in German] (2001), Für Christus und Österreich. Menschen, die Jesus Christus und ihr Heimatland liebten, Perfectae Caritatis, ISBN 3-9501402-0-4
- Kempner, Benedicta Maria [in German] (1966), Priester vor Hitlers Tribunalen, München: Rütten & Loening
- Kreutner, Bernhard (2021), Gefangener 2959. Das Leben des Heinrich Maier, Mann Gottes und unbeugsamer Widerstandskämpfer (in German), München: Ecowin, ISBN 978-3-7110-0253-2
- Loidl, Franz [in German] (1987), "Nochmals Kaplan Heinrich Maier, österreichischer Widerstandskämpfer († 22.3.1945)", Wiener Katholische Akademie, Arbeitskreis für kirchliche Zeit- und Wiener Diözesangeschichte. Miscellanea, ser. III, 172: 27
- Rodt, Norbert; Hecht, Anton; Degasperi, Ernst [in German] (1995), Zeugnis der Auferstehung. Dokumente und Bilder aus dem Leben des Priesters Heinrich Maier, Innsbruck: Tyrolia, ISBN 978-3-7022-1981-9
- Ursula Rumpler (2007). "MAIER, Heinrich". In Bautz, Traugott (ed.). Biographisch-Bibliographisches Kirchenlexikon (BBKL) (in German). Vol. 27. Nordhausen: Bautz. cols. 885–899. ISBN 978-3-88309-393-2.
- Siebenbürger, Ralf (May 2014), "Heinrich Maier – Ein Seelsorger im Widerstand", Der Freiheitskämpfer, 63 (41): 8–10
- Steiner, Herbert [in German] (1964), Zum Tode verurteilt: Österreicher gegen Hitler. Eine Dokumentation, Wien: Europa Verlag
- Turner, Christopher, The CASSIA Spy Ring in World War II Austria: A History of the OSS's Maier-Messner Group, Jefferson, North Carolina: McFarland & Company, ISBN 978-1476669694
- Weinzierl, Erika (1998), "Katholische Priester im Widerstand", in Liebmann, M.; Paarhammer, H.; Rinnerthaler, A. (eds.), Staat und Kirche in der "Ostmark", Frankfurt: Peter Lang, pp. 473–500, ISBN 978-3-631-32164-5
