= Anabaptist Museum (Austria) =

Open-air museum in Austria

Coordinates: 48.4839°N 16.6761°E

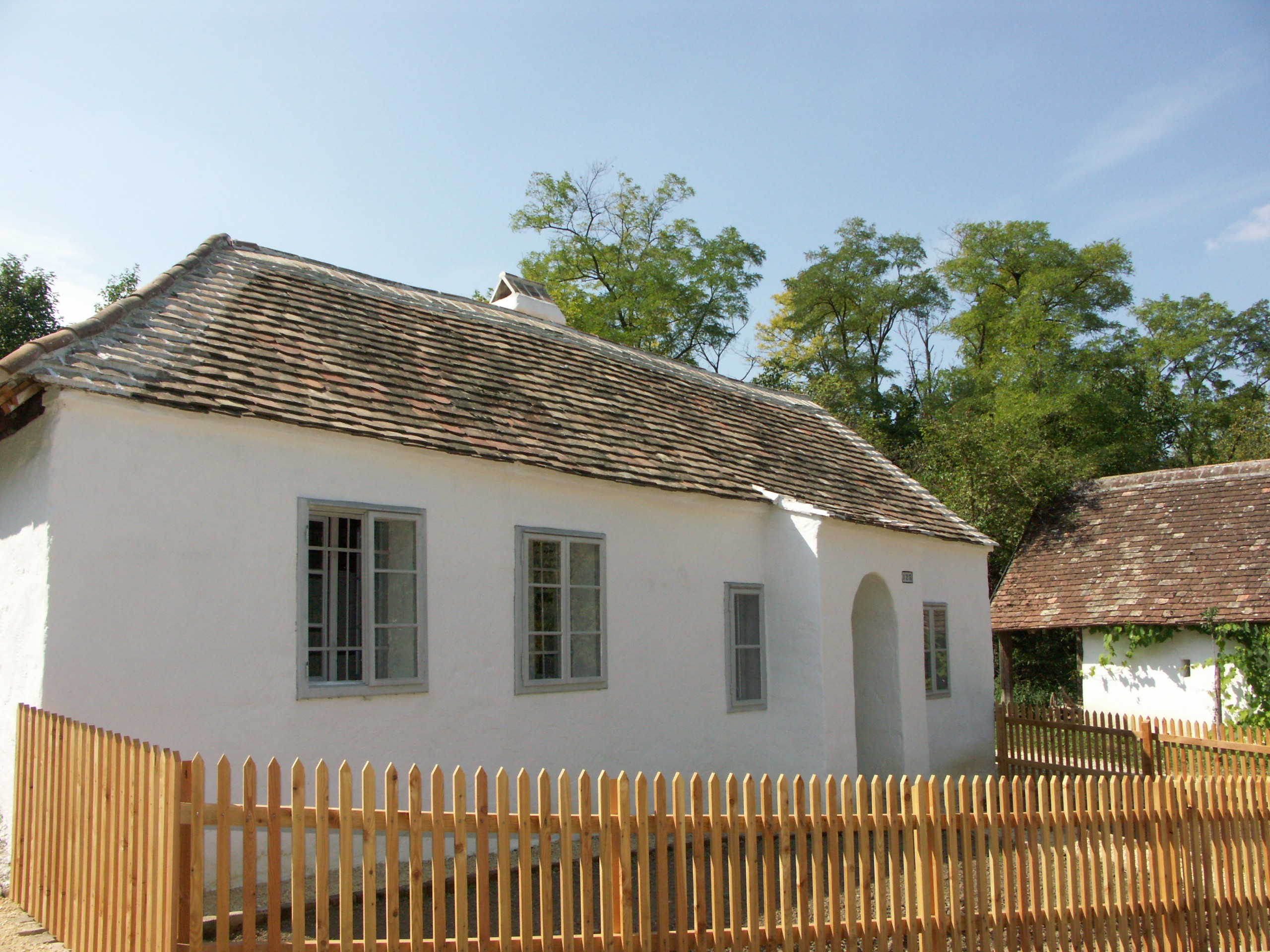
The so-called "Kleinhäuslerhaus" from Wilfersdorf houses now the first museum of Anabaptist history in Austria

The Anabaptist Museum is a part of the open-air museum Museumsdorf Niedersulz. The museum is located in the village of Sulz im Weinviertel, about 45 km north of Vienna in the province of Lower Austria. The museum houses an exhibition about the history of Anabaptist groups in Austria with a focus on the Hutterites.

== Facility ==
The Anabaptist Museum is situated in a house originally located in Wilfersdorf. It is a "Kleinhäuslerhaus", a house of tenant farmers. The building is mentioned in 1600, 1774 and 1815 in the cadastre of the Liechtenstein family, the lords of Wilfersdorf. In 2007 the house was transferred to the open-air museum Niedersulz.

== Hutterites of the Weinviertel region ==
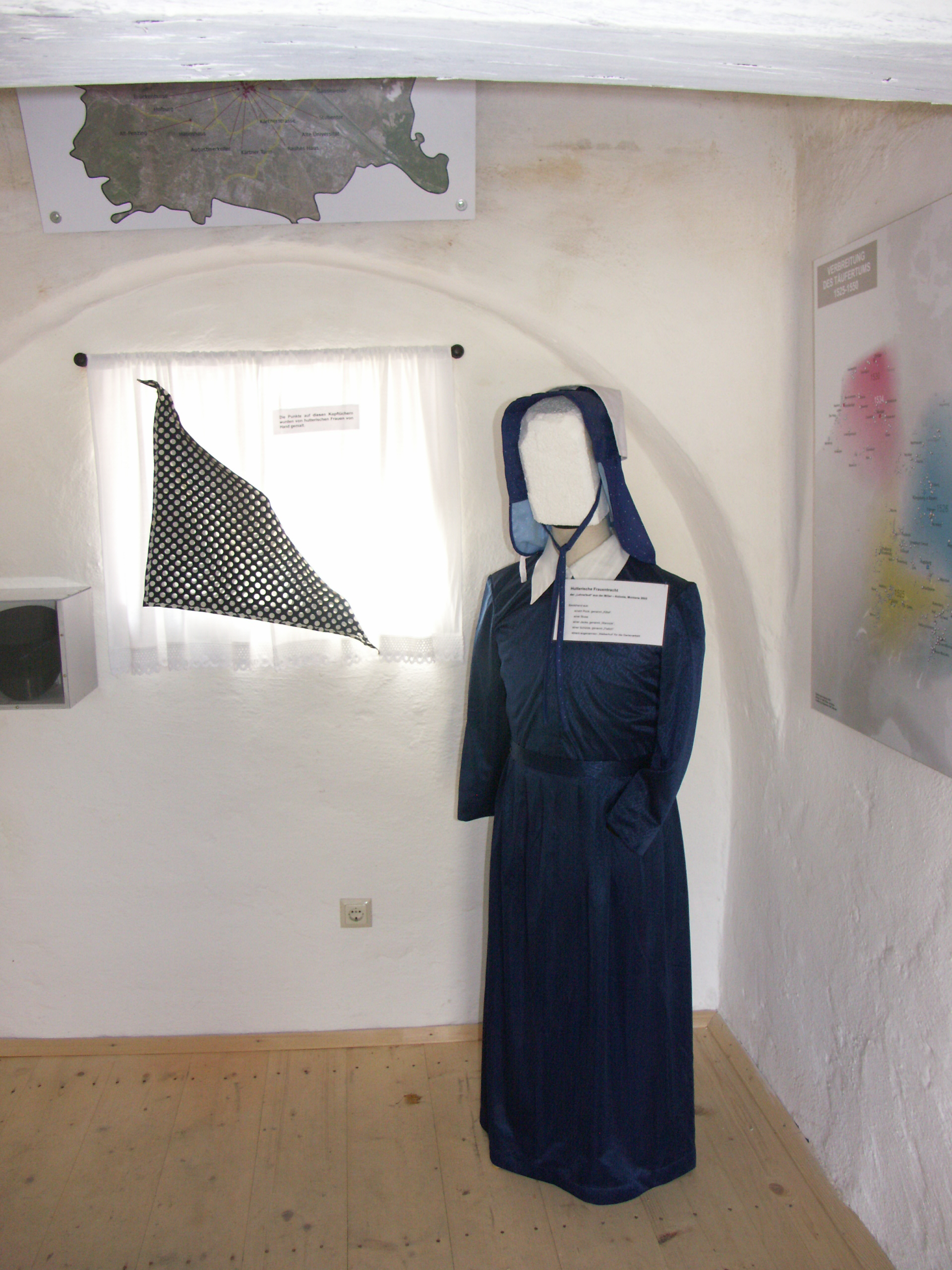
Typical costume of Hutterite women.

In the 16th and early 17th centuries the Weinviertel region in Lower Austria and the adjacent region of Southern Moravia became centers of the Hutterite movement. Under the protection of local aristocrats like the Liechtenstein family the Hutterites flourished for over a century, until renewed persecution after the Battle of White Mountain forced them once again to migrate, first to Transylvania, and then, in the 18th century, to Ukraine. At the end of the 19th century most of the Hutterites left Europe and settled in North America.

== Museum ==
The museum documents the history of Anabaptism in Austria in general with a special focus on the Hutterites in Moravia and Lower Austria. Present-day life of Hutterites in North America is also presented.

== Bibliography ==
- Reinhold Eichinger, Josef F. Enzenberger: Anabaptists, Hutterites and Habans in Austria: Anabaptist Museum Niedersulz, VTR Nürnberg 2012, ISBN 978-3-941750-28-9 (museum guide)
- Reinhold Eichinger, Josef F. Enzenberger: Täufer, Hutterer und Habaner in Österreich: Täufermuseum Niedersulz, VTR Nürnberg 2011, ISBN 978-3-941750-27-2 (Museumsführer)
