= Taborstraße station =

Vienna U-Bahn station

Taborstraße
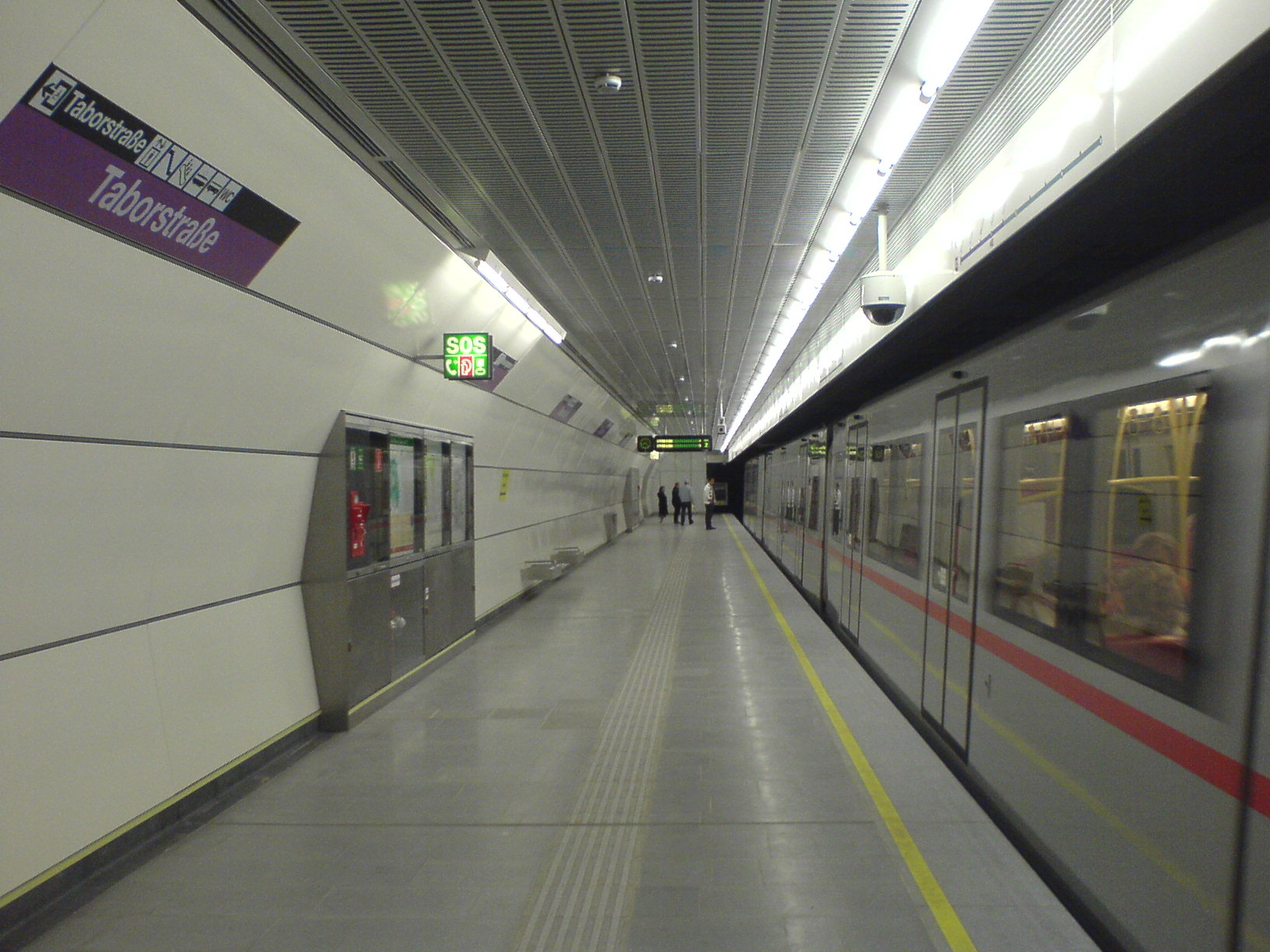

General information
- Location: Leopoldstadt, Vienna; Austria
- Coordinates: 48.2190°N 16.3808°E
- Tram routes: 2
- Bus routes: 5B, N29

History
- Opened: 2008

Services
Preceding station	Wiener Linien	Following station
Schottenring toward Karlsplatz	U2	Praterstern toward Seestadt
Location

Taborstraße is a station on the U2 of the Vienna U-Bahn. It is located in Leopoldstadt, Vienna's 2nd district. The station opened in May 2008 as part of the second extension of the U2.

== About ==
The station opened on May 10, 2008, with the launch of the second extension of the U2 line between Schottenring and Stadion. It features exits leading to Taborstraße / Obere Augartenstraße and Novaragasse. The building at Novaragasse 8, which houses the subway entrance, is owned by Wiener Linien and was constructed as a residential building with an integrated U-Bahn entrance. The station is located near the Augarten, as well as the Bricks club.

The station is equipped with multiple lifts and escalators, making it accessible. It has dual side platforms, one for each direction of travel.

It is served by the Wiener Linien bus line 5B, tram line 2, and the N29 night bus, which stop at the Taborstraße / Obere Augartenstraße exit.

== Art ==
In 2008, the smoke ventilation system at the eastern edge of the building at Novaragasse 8 was decorated by artist Ingeborg Strobl with botanical motifs. The artwork, created in collaboration with KÖR Kunst im öffentlichen Raum (Public Art Vienna), consists of 56 enamel plates, with a total height of 26 meters and a width of 4.5 meters. The floral designs are inspired by 19th-century woodcuts and reference both the former names of Novaragasse (which was called Gartengasse from 1797 to 1812 and Gärtnergasse from 1812 to 1862) and the Austrian scientific Novara Expedition (1857–1859).

== Gallery ==
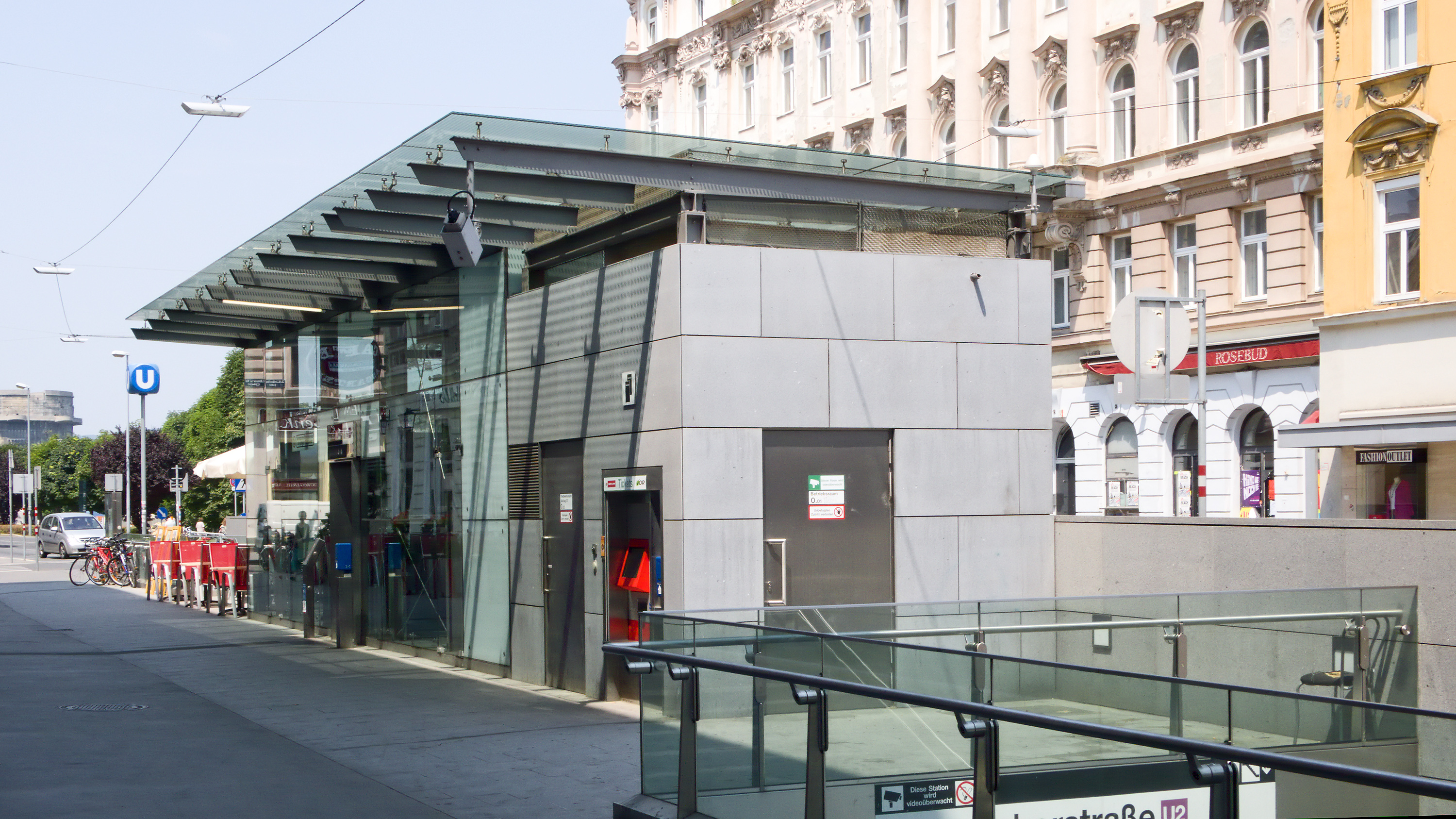
An entrance

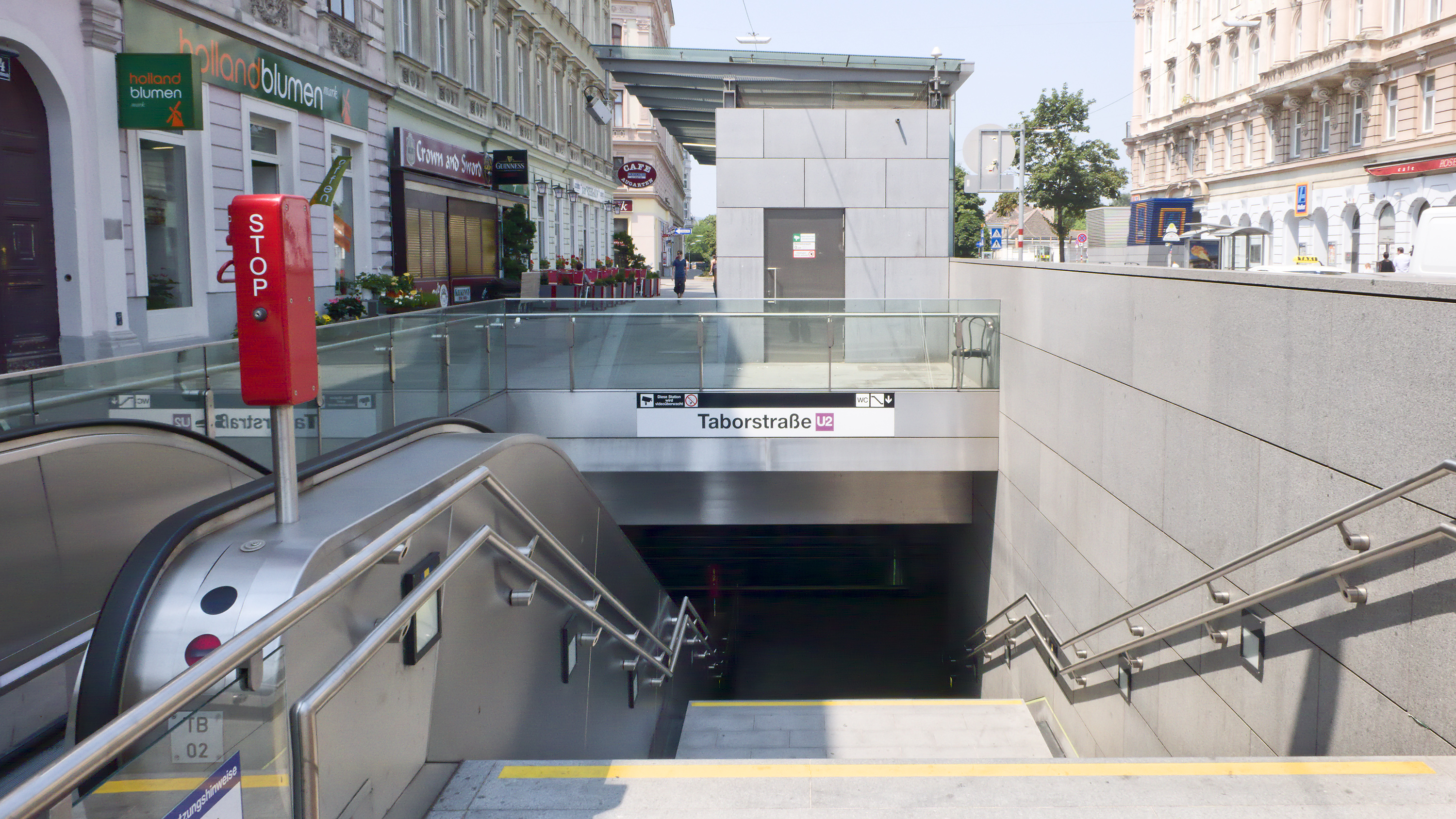
Stairs leading to the platforms

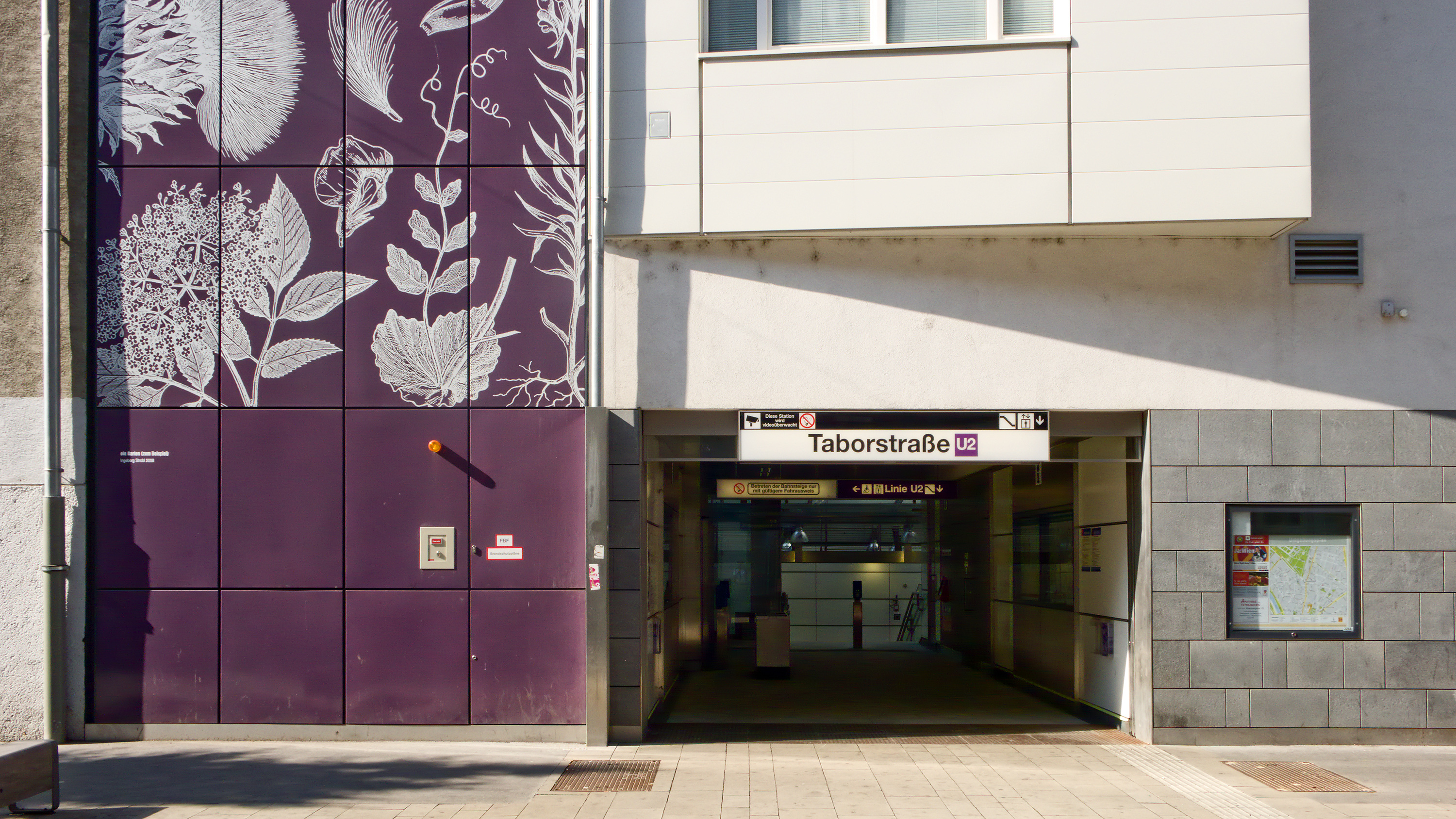
Novaragasse entrance with art by

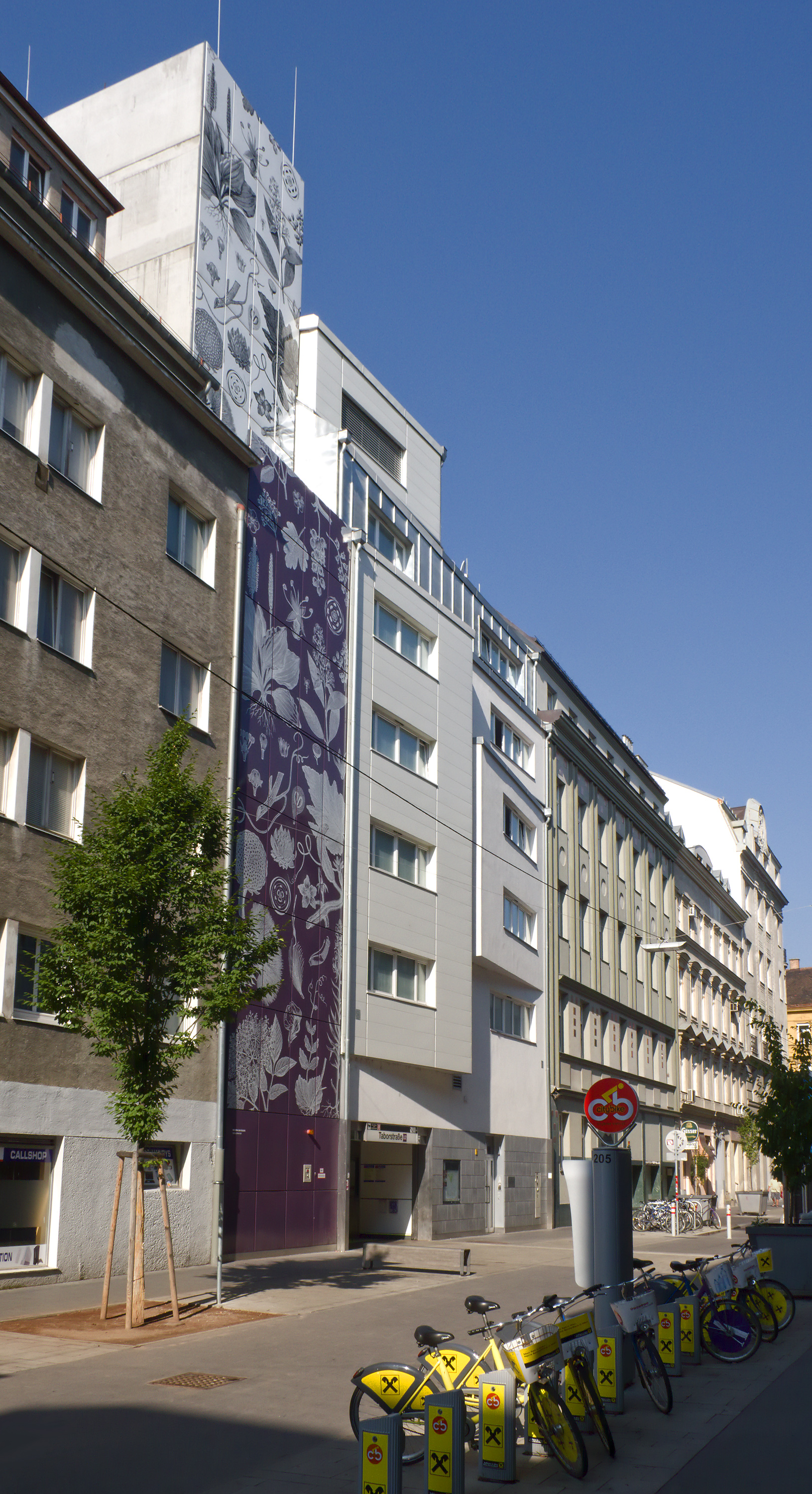
Novaragasse entrance

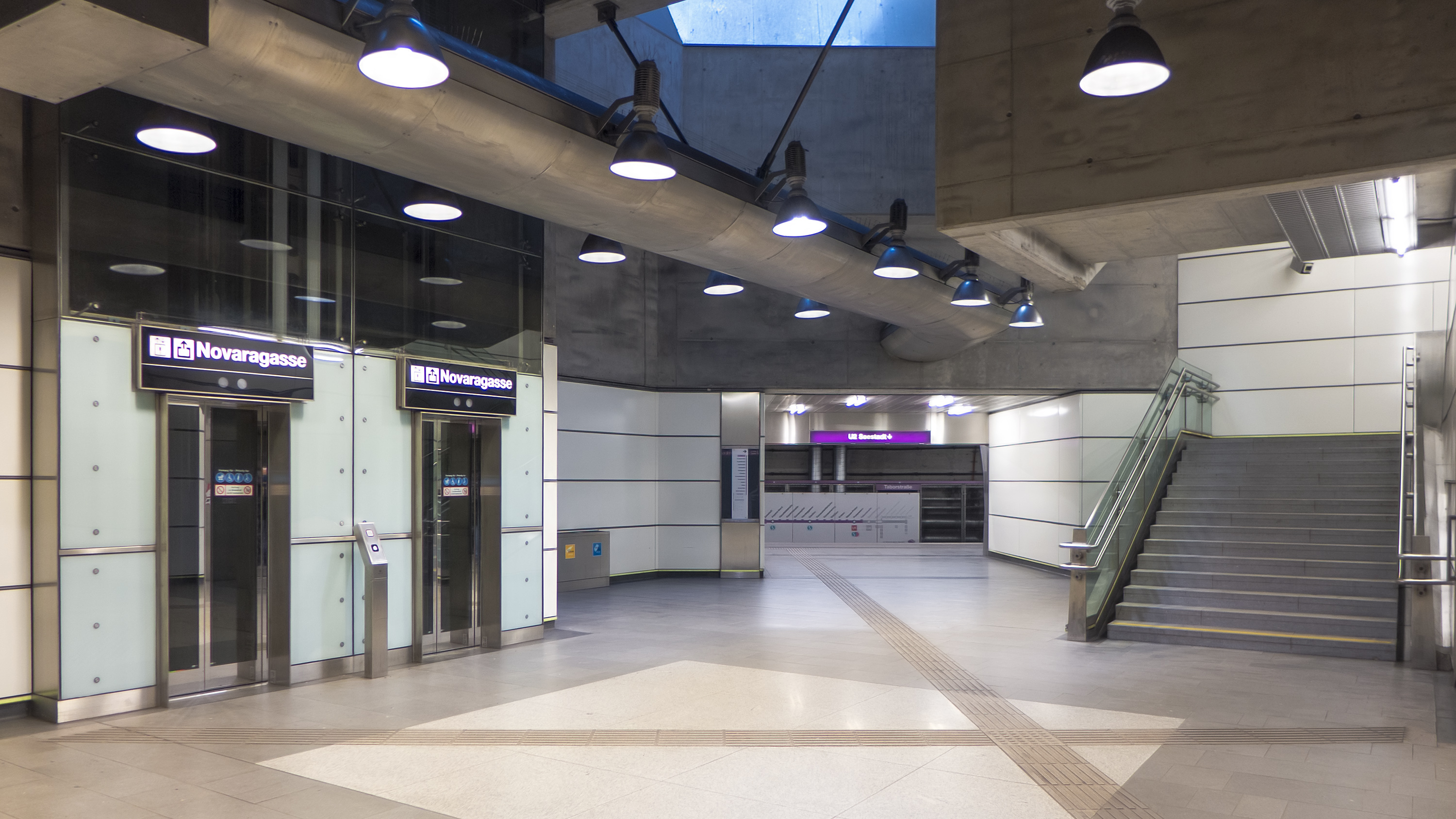
In the station

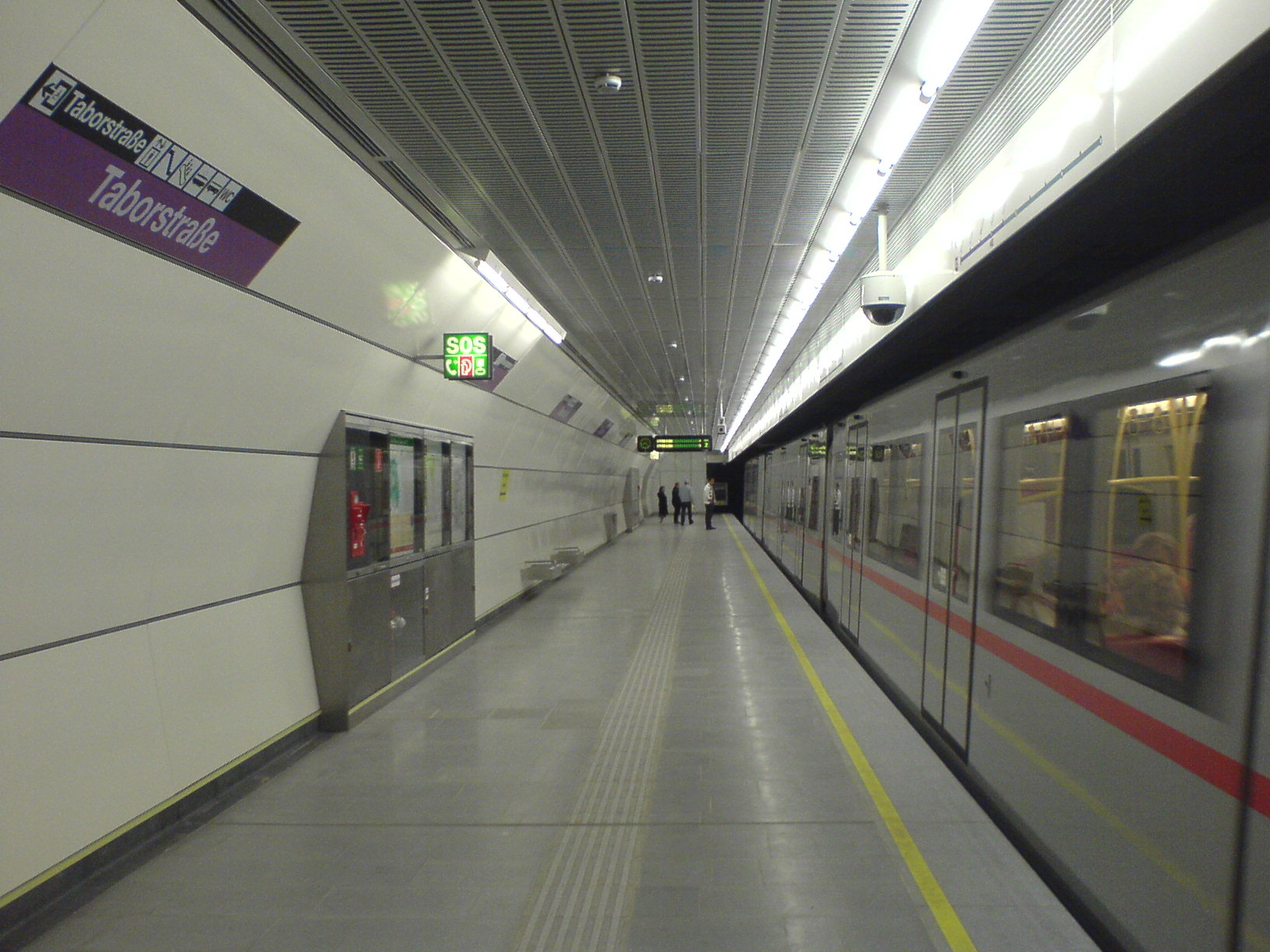
On the platform

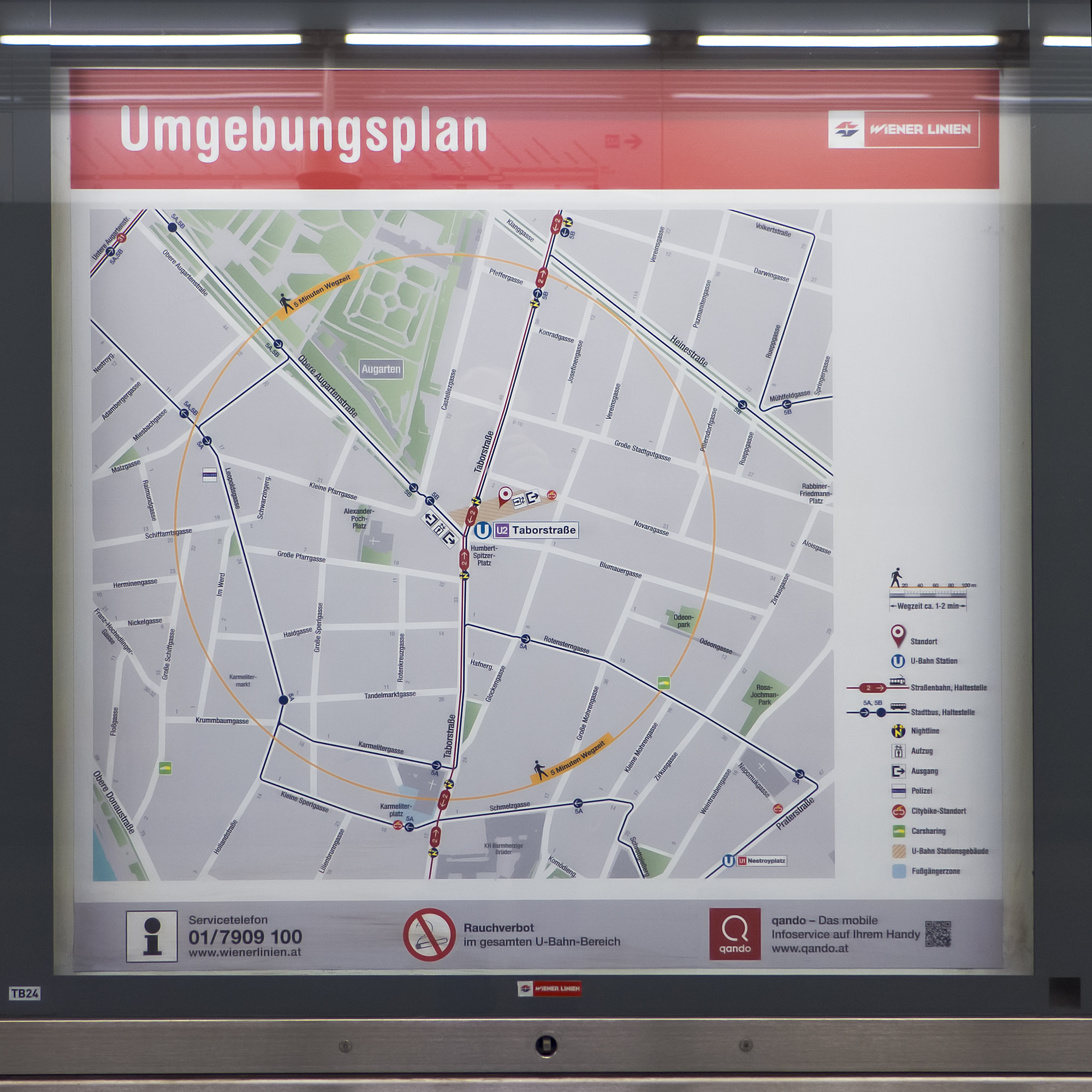
Map of the surrounding area
