= Schottenring station =

Vienna U-Bahn station

Schottenring
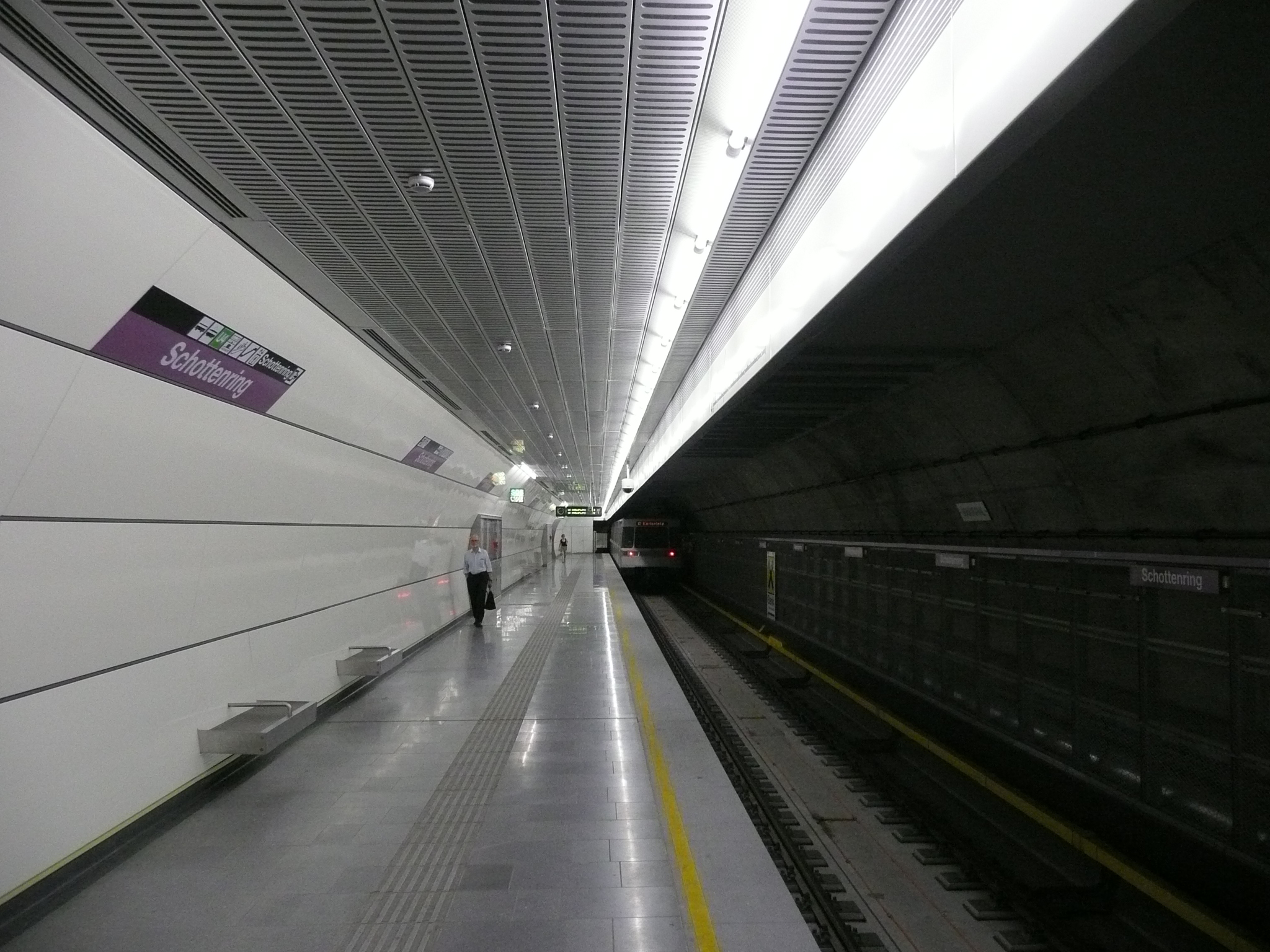

General information
- Location: Innere Stadt, Vienna; Austria
- Coordinates: 48.2171°N 16.3713°E

History
- Opened: 1978

Services
Preceding station	Wiener Linien	Following station
Schottentor toward Karlsplatz	U2	Taborstraße toward Seestadt
Schwedenplatz toward Hütteldorf	U4	Roßauer Lände toward Heiligenstadt
Location

Schottenring is a station on the U2 and U4 of the Vienna U-Bahn. It is located under the Donaukanal, in the Innere Stadt district. The station opened in 1978.

== About ==
The station was originally built for the Vienna steam city railway and designed by Otto Wagner. Construction was completed in 1900, and it opened in 1901. After closures and reconstructions, it was converted for U-Bahn use.

The station runs parallel to and beneath the Donaukanal. The U4 platforms are located along the canal, while the U2 platforms are situated about 23 metres below it in separate tunnel tubes. The U2 began serving the station in 1980; between 2002 and 2008, the U2 facilities were rebuilt, and a new deep-level U2 station opened in 2008.
