= Herrnbaumgarten =

- Municipality
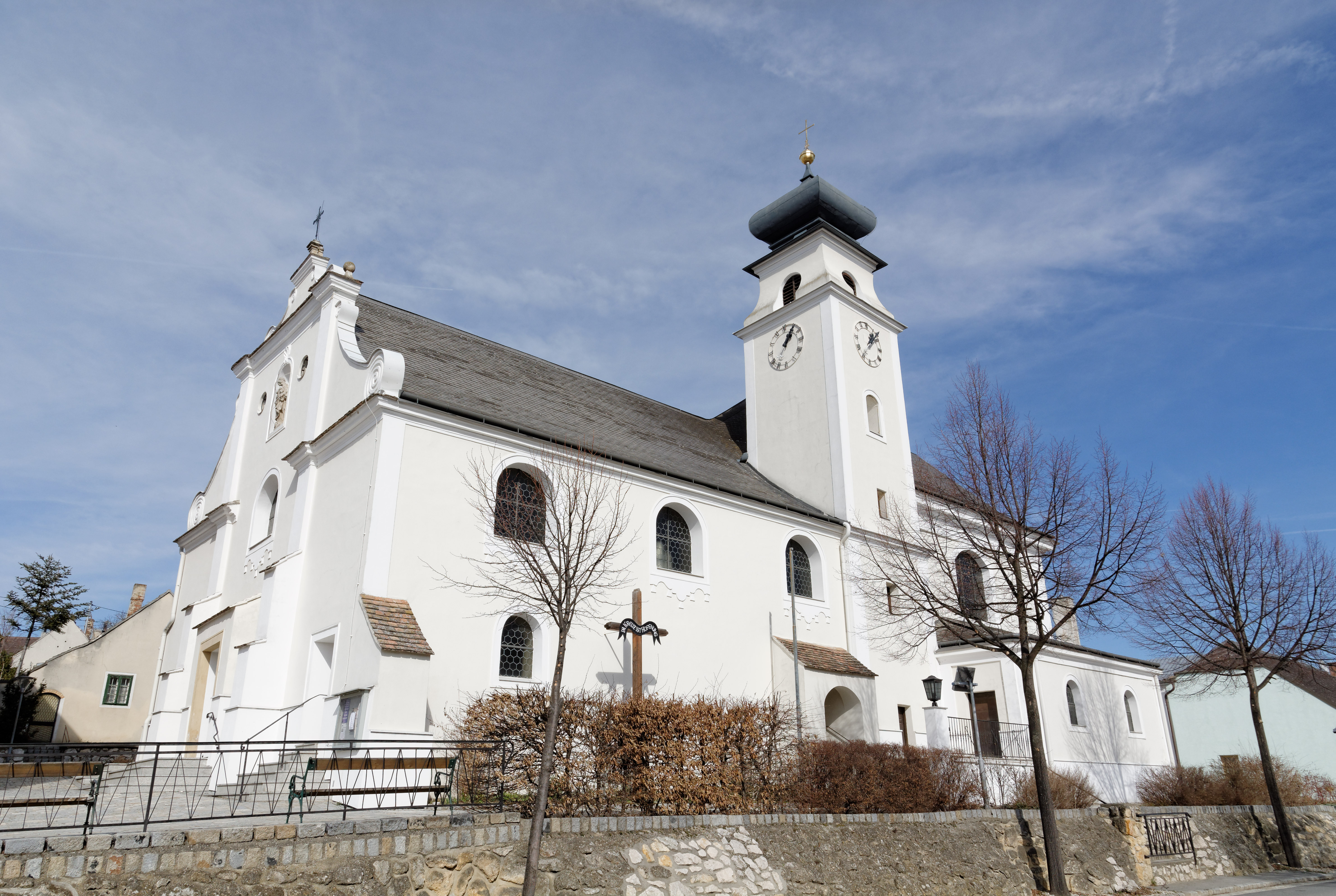
- Herrnbaumgarten parish church

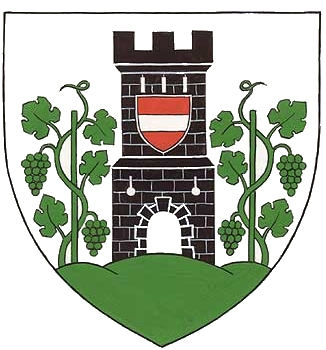
- Coat of arms

- Location within Austria
- Coordinates: 48°42′N 16°41′E
- Country: Austria
- State: Lower Austria
- District: Mistelbach

Government
  - Mayor: Christian Frank

Area
  - Total: 16.49 km^{2} (6.37 sq mi)
- Elevation: 212 m (696 ft)

Population (2018-01-01)
  - Total: 943
  - Density: 57.2/km^{2} (148/sq mi)
- Time zone: UTC+1 (CET)
  - Summer (DST): UTC+2 (CEST)
- Postal code: 2171
- Area code: 02555
- Website: www.herrnbaumgarten.at

Herrnbaumgarten is a town in the district of Mistelbach in the Austrian state of Lower Austria.

== Population ==
Historical population
Year	Pop.	±%
1831	1,750	—
1835	1,830	+4.6%
1870	1,712	−6.4%
1971	1,233	−28.0%
1981	1,111	−9.9%
1991	1,046	−5.9%
2001	1,007	−3.7%
