= Beethoven-Haus Baden =

Historic house museum in Austria

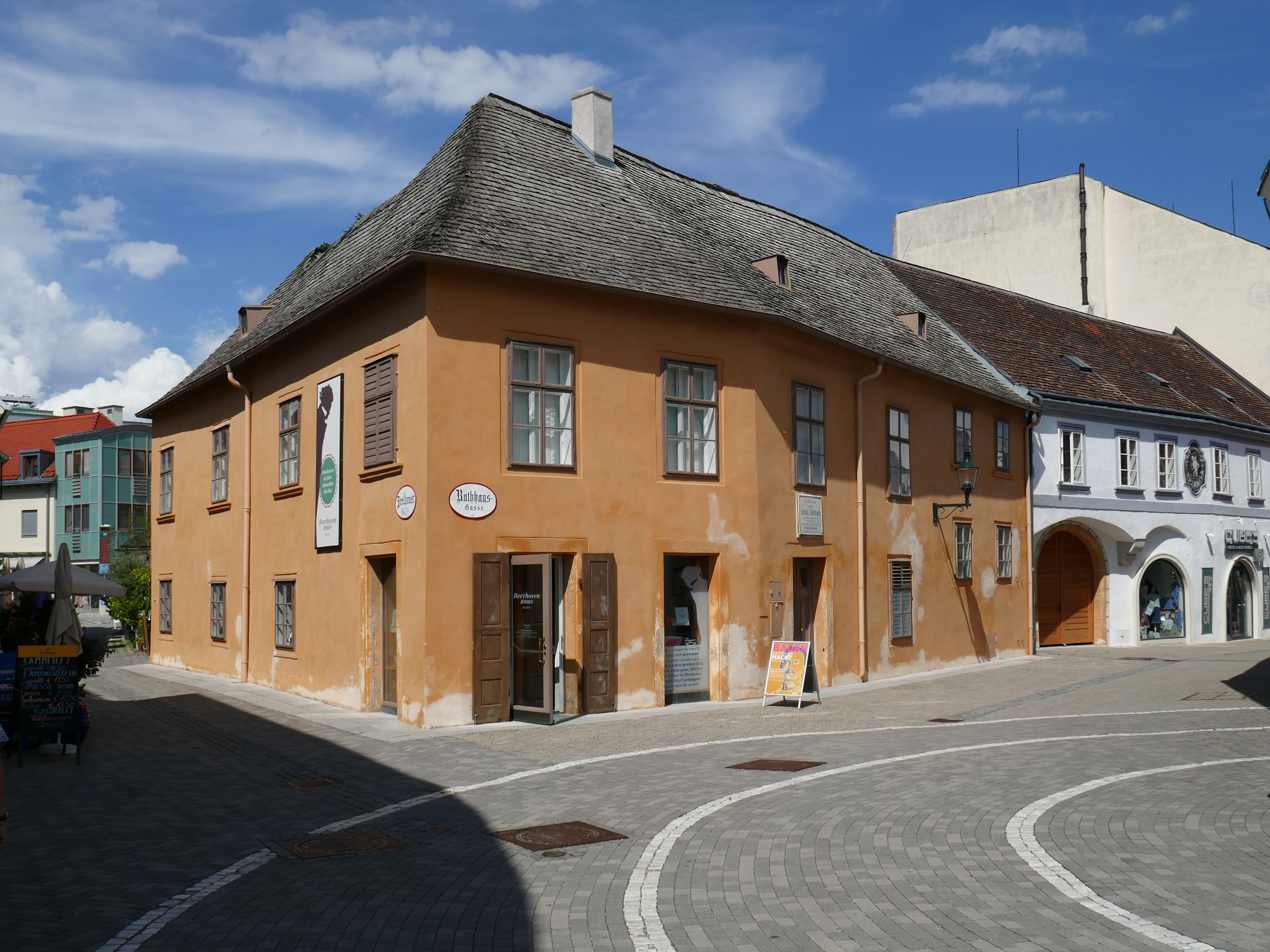
- Interactive map of the Beethoven-Haus Baden area

General information
- Location: Rathausgasse 10, 2500 Baden, Baden bei Wien, Austria
- Coordinates: 48°0′27.936″N 16°13′58.404″E

Website
- www.beethovenhaus-baden.at/en/

Beethoven-Haus Baden, is a museum in Baden bei Wien in Lower Austria. Ludwig van Beethoven stayed here during three summers in the 1820; it is dedicated to the composer, and in particular his Symphony No. 9, on which he worked here during 1823.

== History ==
Beethoven visited Baden, a spa town, several times, in order to improve his health, living in various lodgings in the town. In 1821, 1822 and 1823 he lived in this house, then known as the Kupferschmiedhaus (coppersmith's house), renting an apartment on the first floor. During his stay in the summer of 1823 he worked on the fourth movement of the Symphony No. 9; the building is known as the Haus der Neunten – "House of the Ninth".

== Description ==
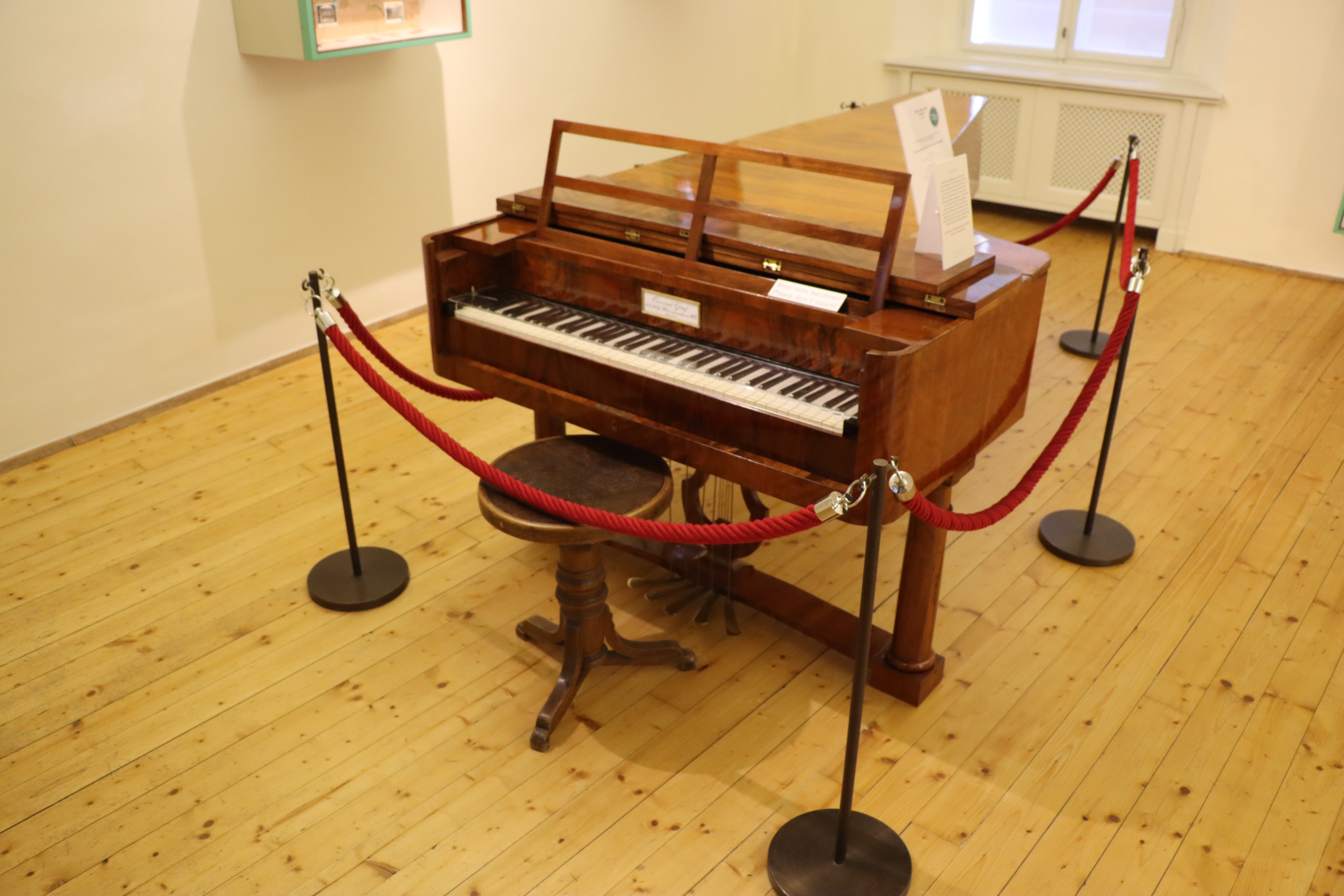
The piano from the house of Josef Perger

In October 2014 the museum was reopened, after closure for two years for renovation. The first floor is restored into the appearance of Beethoven's day; there is memorabilia of the composer, including texts from letters he wrote from Baden. The ground floor is about his Ninth Symphony. The basement includes a separate area where the phenomenon of sound can be explored, and visitors can experience Beethoven's progressive deafness first-hand.

Exhibits in the museum include a piano made by Conrad Graf, once in the house of Josef Perger, a local merchant, where Beethoven was often a guest. It was donated to the town of Baden by Magdalena Perger in 1895.

== See also ==
- List of music museums
