= Roßauer Lände station =

Vienna U-Bahn station

Roßauer Lände
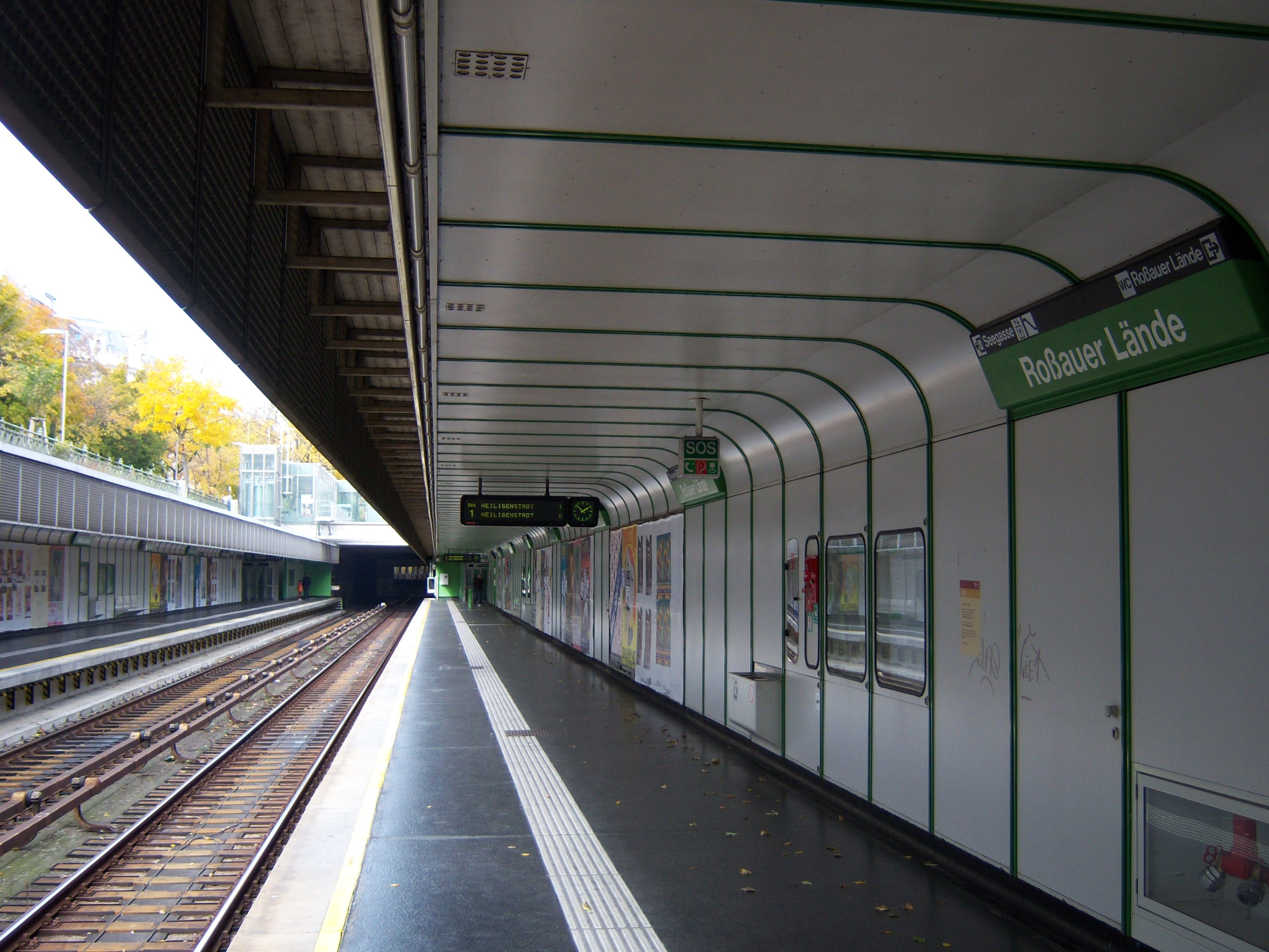

General information
- Location: Alsergrund, Vienna; Austria
- Coordinates: 48.2222°N 16.3676°E

History
- Opened: 1978

Services
Preceding station	Wiener Linien	Following station
Schottenring toward Hütteldorf	U4	Friedensbrücke toward Heiligenstadt
Location

Roßauer Lände is a station on U4 of the Vienna U-Bahn. It is located in the Alsergrund District, which is the 9th district of Vienna. It opened in 1978 and has two side platforms. The name corresponds to the street Rossauer Lände (in the old spelling), which is named after the historic district of Rossau. It is located in the Gallery Route parallel to the Donaukanal (Danube Canal) and extends between Mosergasse and the Siemens-Nixdorf-Steg pedestrian bridge.

== History ==
=== Steam Tram Era ===
The station was built for the Danube Canal line of the Vienna Steam City Railway. In the early plans, it still appears as Rossau or Elisabethqua. The stop, designed by Otto Wagner on behalf of the Commission for Transport Facilities in Vienna, was structurally completed in March 1900 and opened on August 6, 1901. Its operational abbreviation is RL; it corresponds to the type of underground railway station as developed by Wagner, which is aesthetically somewhat more modern than that of the elevated railway stations.

According to a city council decision of May 1, 1903, the station was given the name Elisabethpromenade soon after its opening. This decision was revised on November 6, 1919 after the end of the monarchy, but initially had no practical effect because the steam tram service on the Danube Canal line had to be completely stopped on December 8, 1918 due to a lack of coal. As a result of the German Orthographic Conference of 1901, the spelling was also changed to Roßauer Lände with “ß”.

=== Electric Light Rail and Subway Era ===
In 1923, the municipality of Vienna leased the city railway, except for the Suburban Line, from the state, electrified the routes and reopened them as the Vienna Electric City Railway. After almost eight years of inactivity, the Roßauer Lände station was served by the DG, GD and WD lines from October 20, 1925. The last lines to run here were the DG, GD, GW and WG lines on March 31, 1978, before the U4 line was extended beyond Friedensbrücke to Schottenring on April 3, 1978, thus marking the beginning of the underground era at the Roßauer Lände station.

At the Grünentorgasse exit, the Otto Wagner-style reception building is still preserved, which can only be reached from the platform area via a fixed staircase. The station has two other barrier-free entrances. One of them is at the northern end of the platforms and takes you to Seegasse by elevator. It was completely redesigned in the 2000s. The second exit leads from the side platform in the direction of Heiligenstadt onto the promenade along the Danube Canal and can be reached at ground level. This entrance was subsequently installed at the beginning of the 2000s.

== Gallery ==
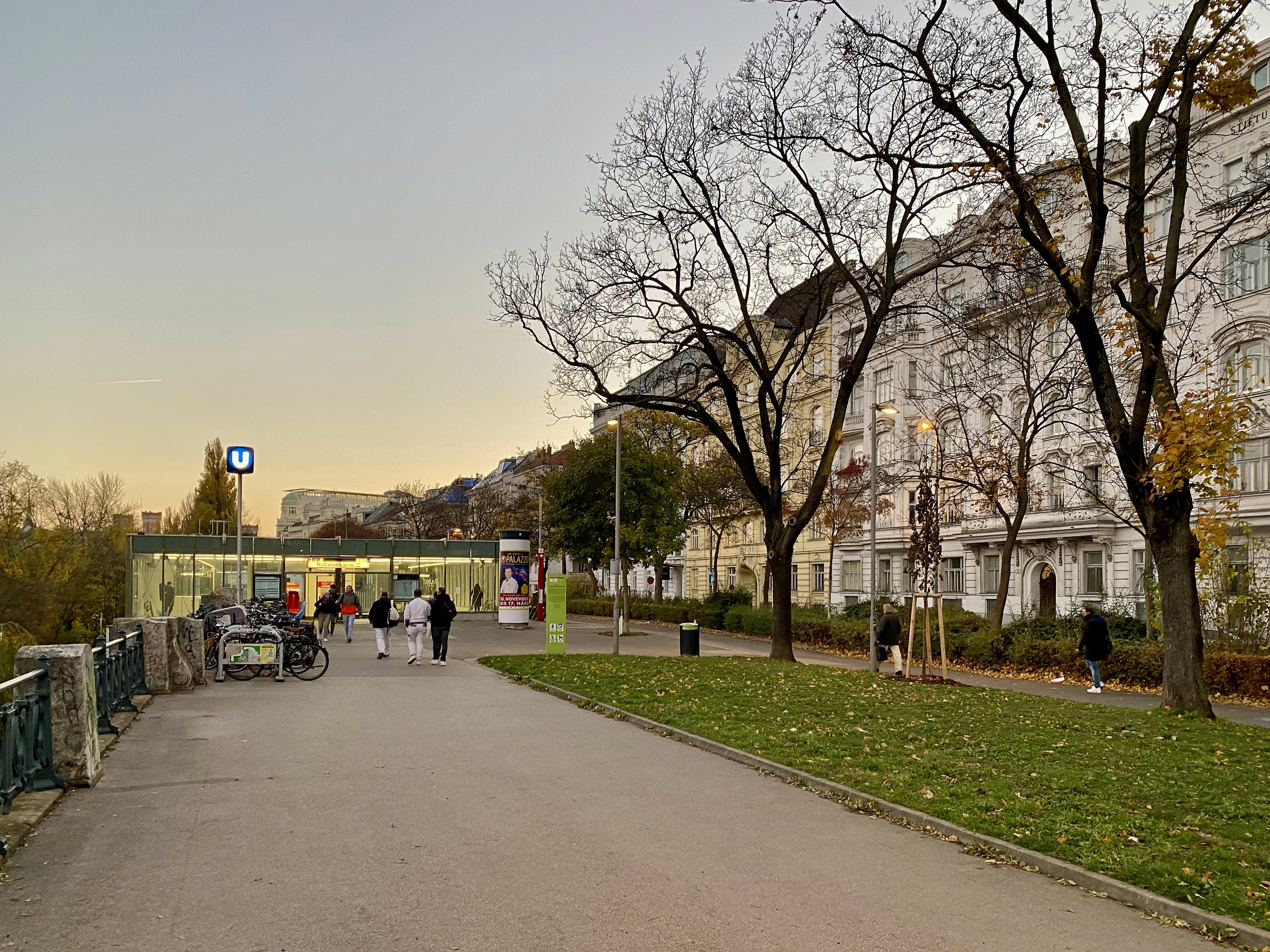
View of the North Entrance

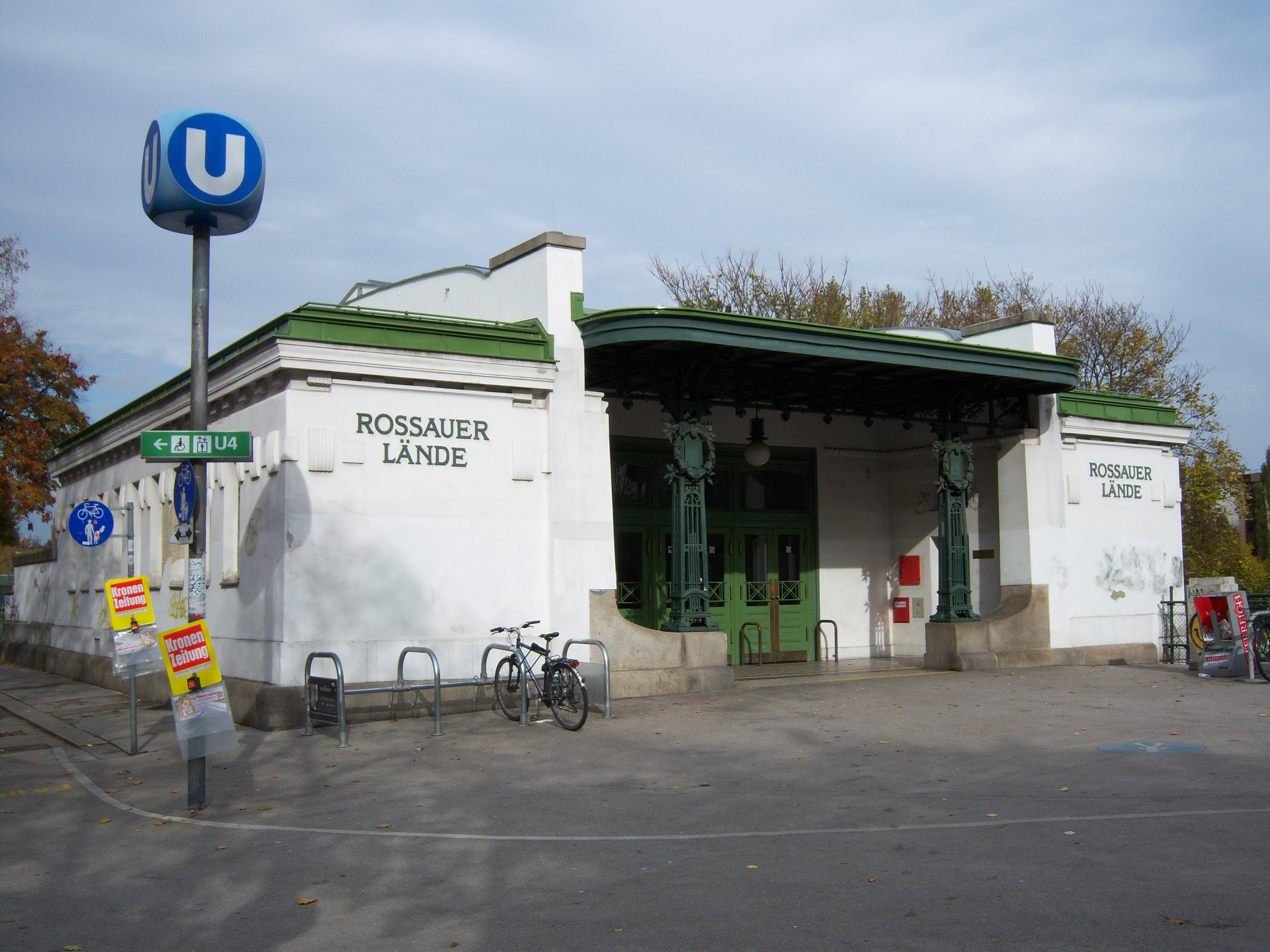
Station Building

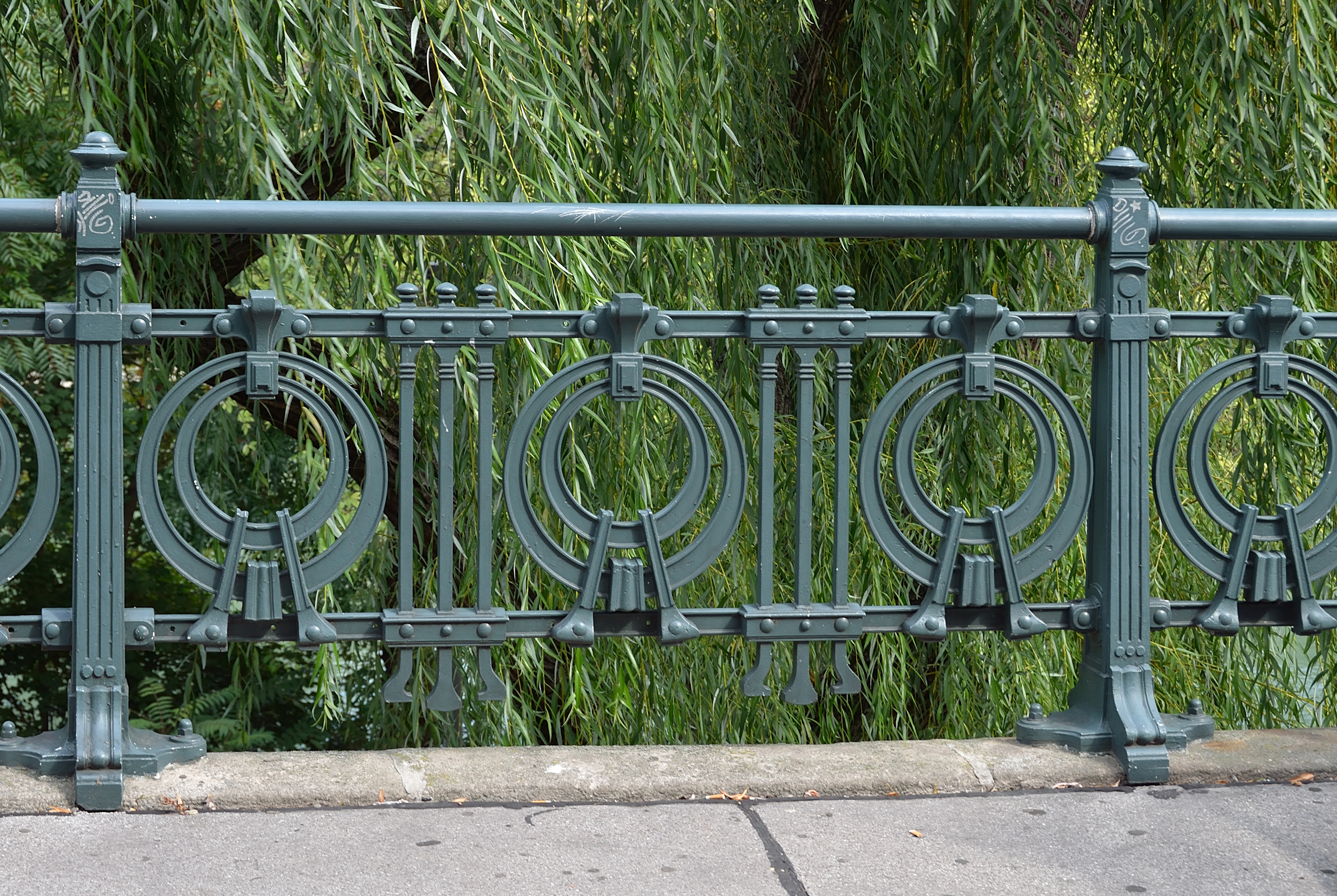
Art Nouveau Fence near U-Bahnhof Roßauer Lände

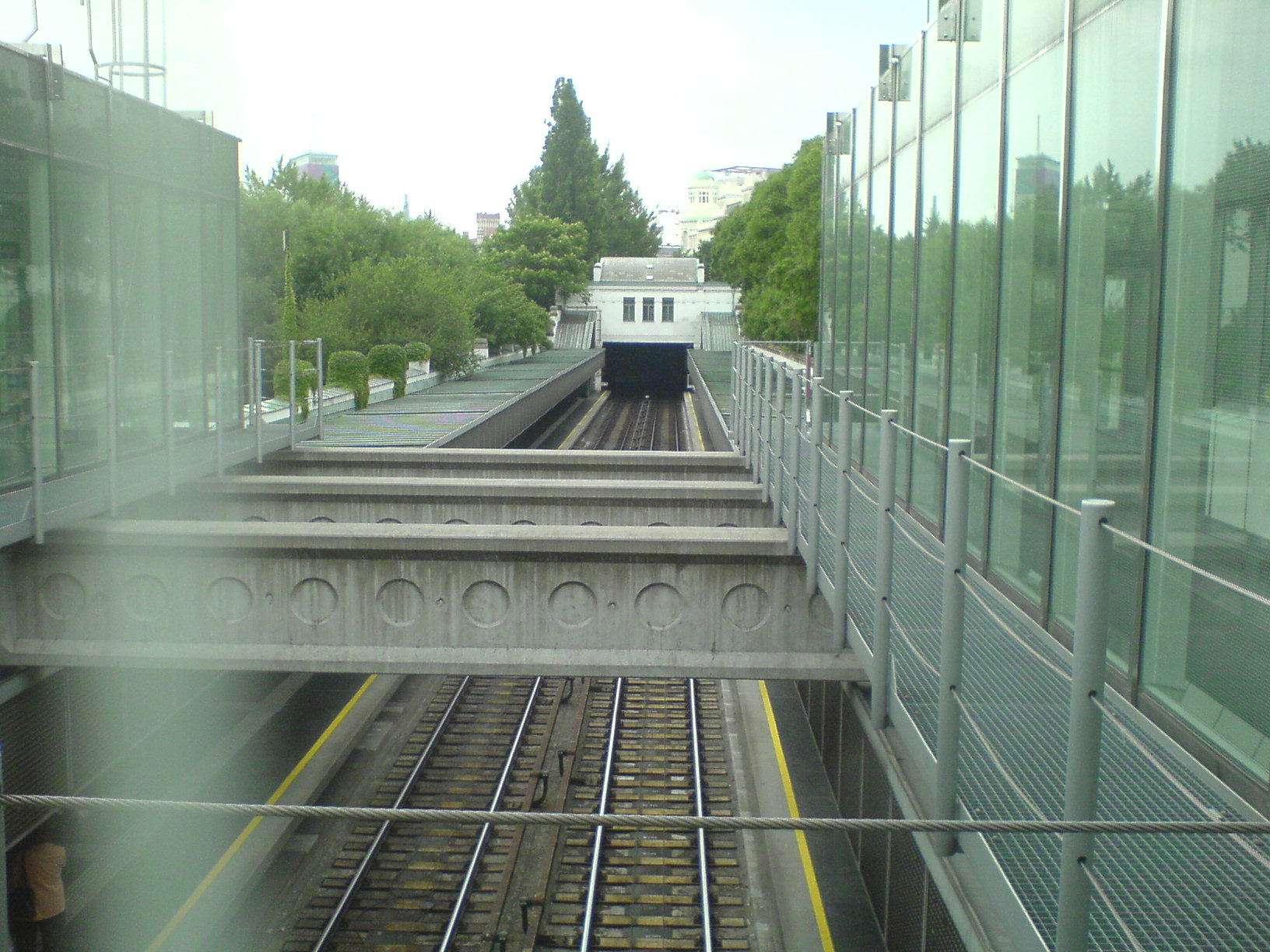
View of Platforms from Above
