= Pleyel Museum =

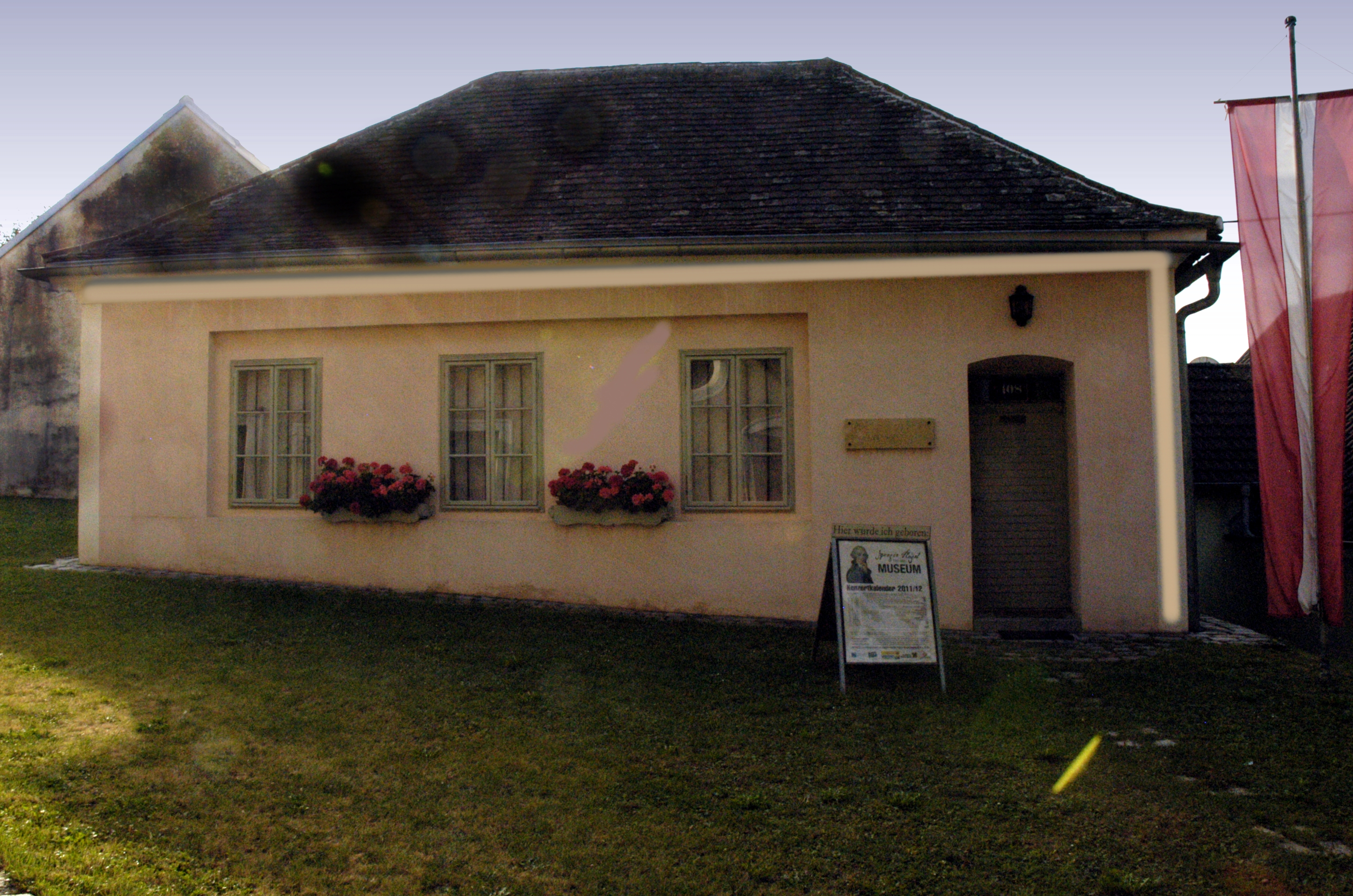
- Interactive map of the Pleyel Museum area

General information
- Location: A-3701 Ruppersthal 137, Austria
- Coordinates: 48°27′59″N 15°56′49″E
- Opened: 1998

Website
- https://www.pleyel.at/

The Pleyel Museum is in Ruppersthal, a village near the town of Großweikersdorf in Lower Austria. It is the birthplace of the composer, piano manufacturer and music publisher Ignaz Pleyel (1757–1831), and is now dedicated to his life and work.

== History ==
=== Pleyel ===
Ignaz Pleyel was born here on 18 June 1757; he was a son of Martin Pleyl, the village schoolmaster, and his wife Anna Theresia. He showed musical talent early in life, and he studied with Johann Baptist Wanhal and Joseph Haydn. He had the support of a patron, Count Ladislaus Erdődy.

The house later became a school, until 1894; it was afterwards used for various purposes; during the Second World War it was used by the occupying forces.

=== The Pleyel Society ===
In 1995 the Internationale Ignaz Joseph Pleyel Gesellschaft (International Ignaz Joseph Pleyel Society) was founded; a goal of the Society was to care for Pleyel's birthplace in Ruppersthal, then called the "Pleyl-Schule", which was in need of repair. The building was acquired in 1996 by the Society; the Governor of Lower Austria, Erwin Pröll, agreed to provide immediate help. Renovation work was completed in late 1998, and it was opened as a museum on 5 September of that year by Erwin Pröll.

== Museum exhibits ==
Particularly important among the exhibits are two pianos manufactured by Pleyel et Cie, the company founded by Ignaz Pleyel. There is a grand piano, made in January 1831, marked Opus 1614. It is playable and has been used for commercial recordings. The museum also has a square piano made by the company, marked Opus 7134, acquired in 2003. Concerts occasionally take place in the museum in which well-known pianists play the grand piano or the square piano.
