= Sulz im Weinviertel =

- Municipality
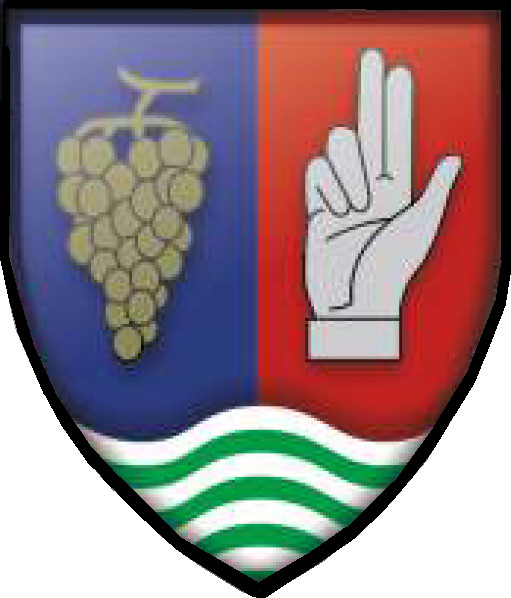
- Coat of arms

- Location within Austria
- Coordinates: 48°29′N 16°40′E
- Country: Austria
- State: Lower Austria
- District: Gänserndorf

Government
  - Mayor: Angela Baumgartner

Area
  - Total: 31.37 km^{2} (12.11 sq mi)
- Elevation: 227 m (745 ft)

Population (2018-01-01)
  - Total: 1,189
  - Density: 37.90/km^{2} (98.17/sq mi)
- Time zone: UTC+1 (CET)
  - Summer (DST): UTC+2 (CEST)
- Postal code: 2224
- Area code: 02534
- Vehicle registration: GF
- Website: www.sulz-weinviertel.gv.at

Sulz im Weinviertel is a town in the district of Gänserndorf in the Austrian state of Lower Austria. It is known for its open air museum in Niedersulz, the largest in Lower Austria.

== History ==
The first documented mention of the town dates back to 1125, with the reference to the town as "Sulze" (lit. swampy terrain).

=== Coat of arms ===
The blue and red in the coat of arms signify the lords of Liechtenstein, who originally occupied part of the area under the lordship of Wilfersdorf. The golden grapes on the left of the coat are based on the agricultural history of the area, which comprised a lot of the economy in antiquity. The silver oath hand on the right side of the coat points symbolically to the Heiligenkreuz Abbey, which has been active since the 12th century. The silver and green waves occupying the bottom of the coat symbolize the geography of the town. The coat of arms was dedicated on 7 June 1980 by Governor of Lower Austria, Andreas Maurer.

== Politics ==
From 2006 to 2010, the mayor of the town was Franz Furherr. From 2010 to 2014, it was Franz Pirkner. Since 2014, the mayor of the town has been Angela Baumgartner. All 3 have been members of the ÖVP.

== Geography ==
Sulz lies in the Weinviertel in Lower Austria. Only about 2.26 percent of the municipality is forested.

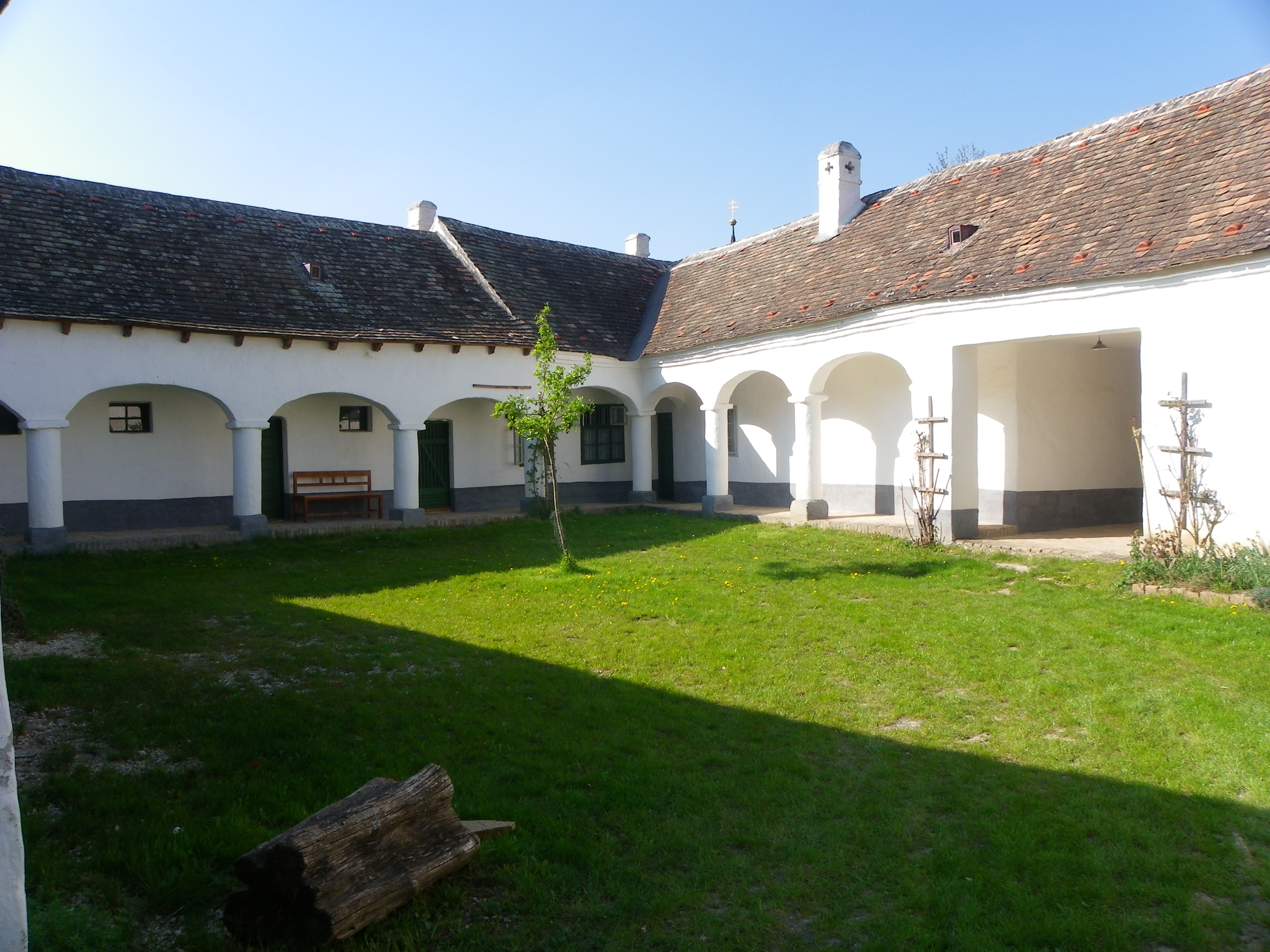
Farm with arcades in Museum.

Cadastral municipalities of Sulz im Weinviertel
Name	Size (km²)	Population (2019)
Erdpreß	0.485	205
Nexing	0.443	49
Niedersulz	0.846	380
Obersulz	1.362	573

== Cultural and historical sites ==
- Parish Church of Niedersulz - Originally medieval church, rebuilt in Baroque style in early 17th century
- Museumsdorf Niedersulz - Open-air museum displaying architectural history of the area
- Anabaptist Museum - Museum detailing history of Anabaptism in Southern Austria
- Parish Church of Obersulz - Catholic church constructed in the 1660s; parish dating back to 13th century

== Famous residents ==
- Angela Baumgartner (born 1969), Member of Austrian National Council
- Valentin Lechner (1777-1849), Composer
- Benedikt Pillwein (1779-1847), Author and scholar
- Matthias Steiner (born 1982), Olympics gold medalist and weightlifter
