= Großweikersdorf =

- Municipality
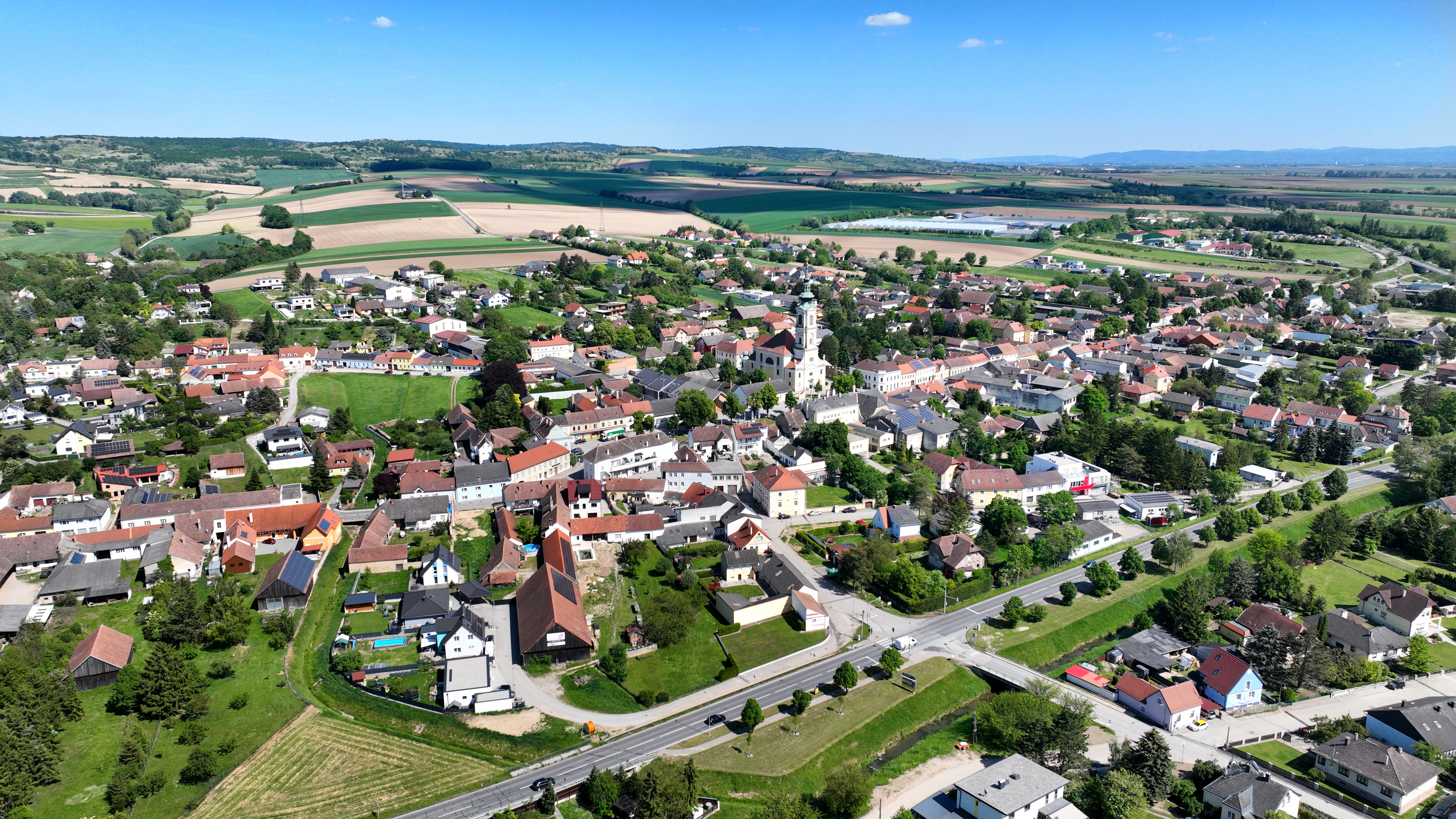
- West-northwest view of Großweikersdorf

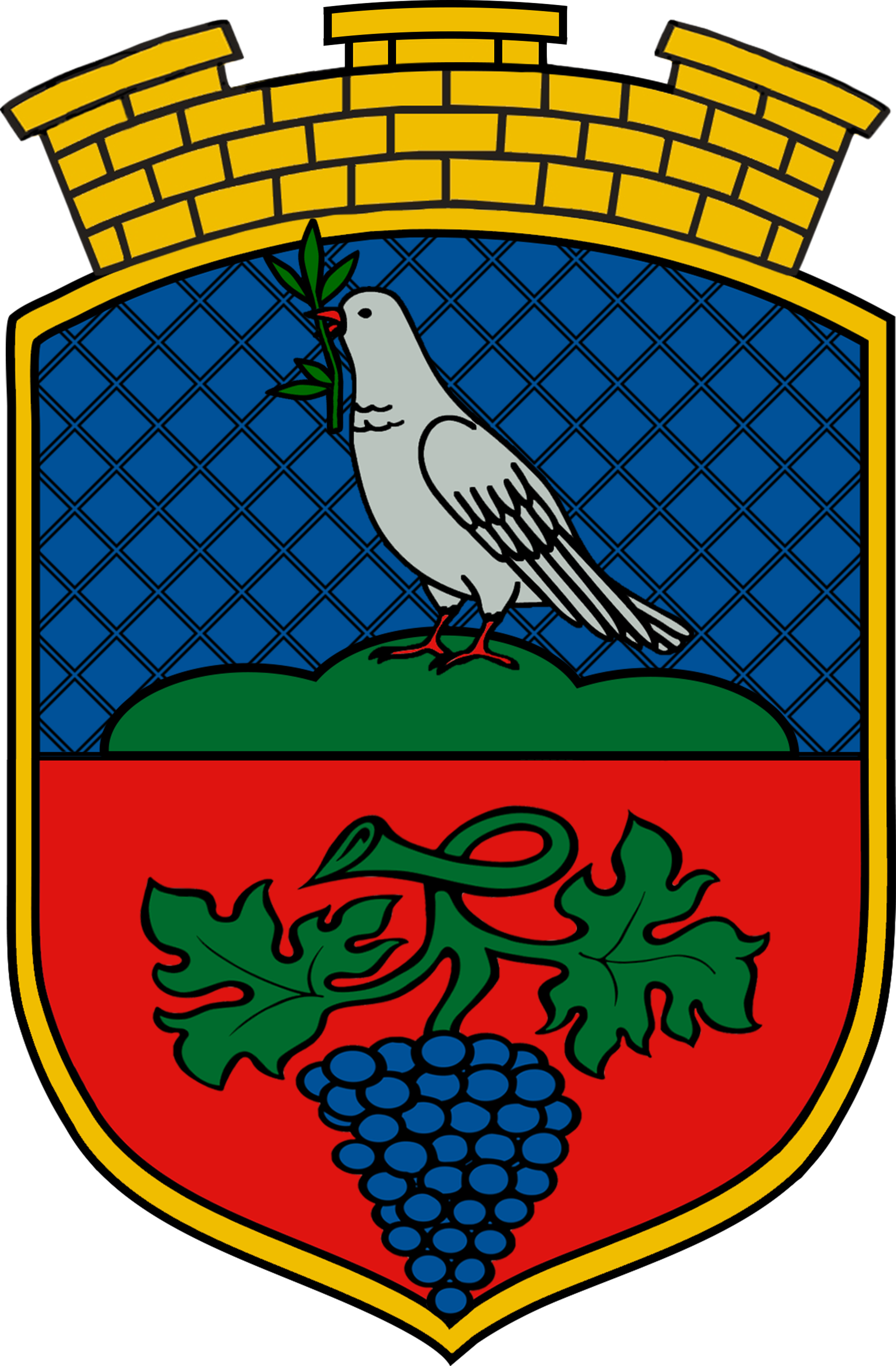
- Coat of arms

- Location within Austria
- Coordinates: 48°28′21″N 15°58′48″E
- Country: Austria
- State: Lower Austria
- District: Tulln

Government
  - Mayor: Leopold Spielauer (ÖVP)

Area
  - Total: 43.36 km^{2} (16.74 sq mi)
- Elevation: 211 m (692 ft)

Population (2018-01-01)
  - Total: 3,180
  - Density: 73.3/km^{2} (190/sq mi)
- Time zone: UTC+1 (CET)
  - Summer (DST): UTC+2 (CEST)
- Postal code: 3701
- Area code: 02955
- Vehicle registration: TU
- Website: www.grossweikersdorf.gv.at

Großweikersdorf is a municipality in the district of Tulln in the Austrian state of Lower Austria.

The composer Ignaz Pleyel (1757–1831) was born in the nearby village of Ruppersthal. His birthplace is now the Pleyel Museum.

The priest Heinrich Maier (1908–1945) was born in Großweikersdorf. His very successful Catholic resistance group during the Nazi era passed on plans and production facilities for V-1, V-2 rockets, Tiger tanks and aircraft to the Allies. This enabled the Allies to target decisive armaments factories and to protect residential areas.

== Population ==
Historical population
Year	Pop.	±%
1971	2,627	—
1981	2,555	−2.7%
1991	2,653	+3.8%
2001	2,786	+5.0%
