= Museumsdorf Niedersulz =

Open-air museum in Austria

Coordinates: 48°29′04″N 16°40′38″E

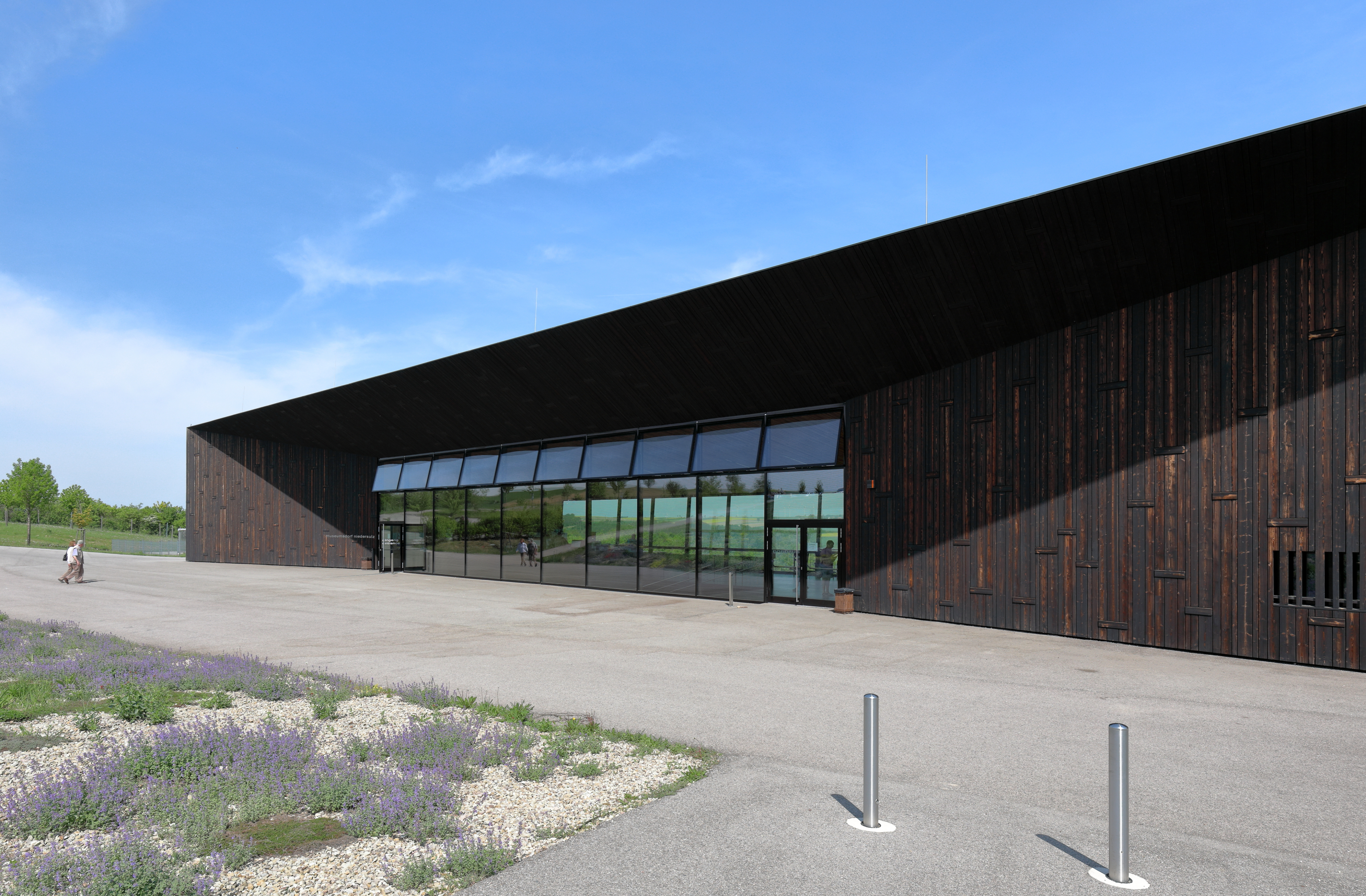
Museum entrance

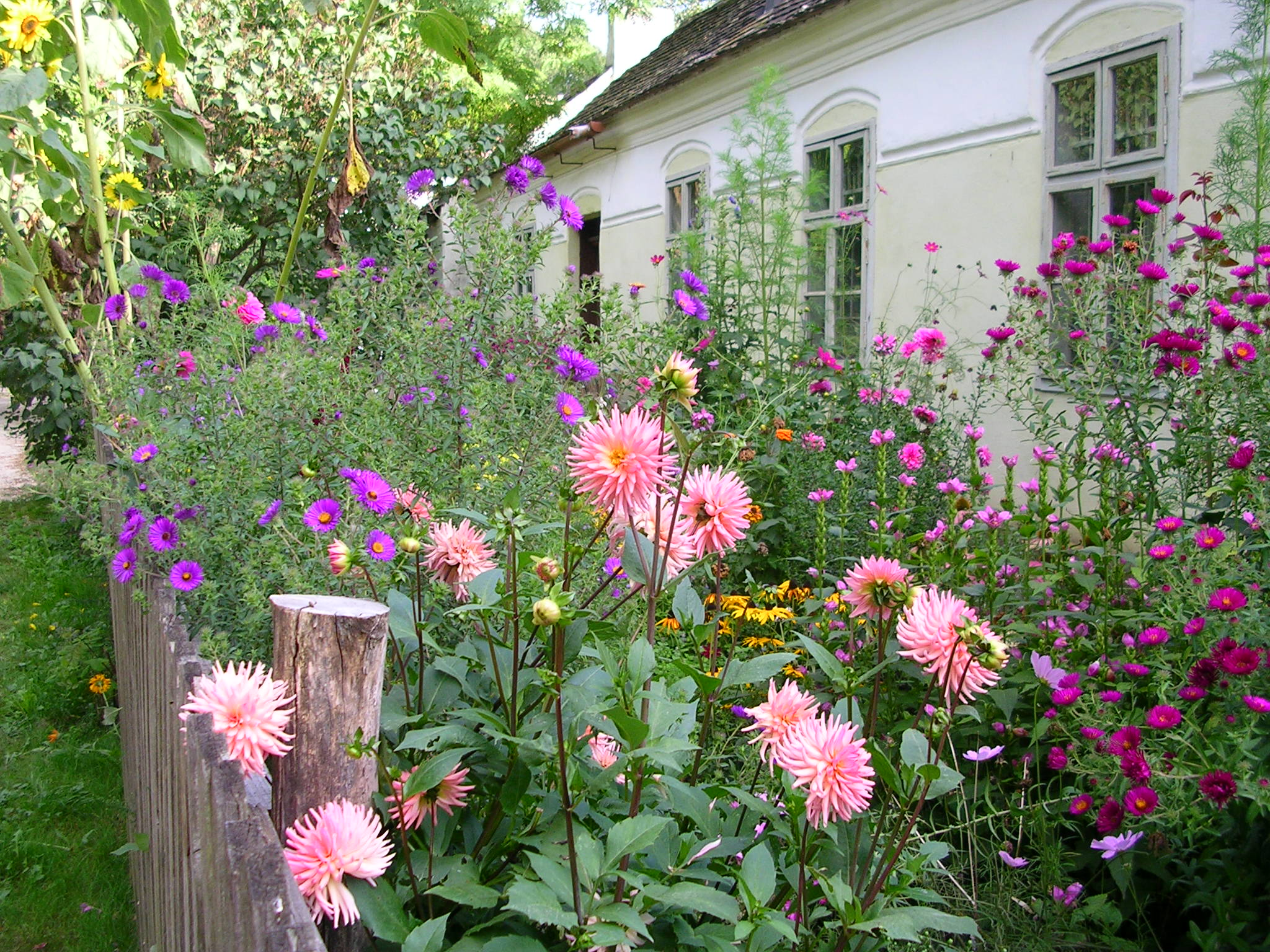
Museumsdorf Niedersulz

Museumsdorf Niedersulz is an open-air museum in Austria that displays traditional buildings and architecture from the Weinviertel. It is located in the village of Sulz im Weinviertel, about 45 km north of Vienna in the province of Lower Austria. The Museumsdorf Niedersulz has over 80 original buildings and structures that have been transported from their original sites.

The Village-Museum of Niedersulz is the largest open-air museum in Lower Austria and was founded in 1979. It consists of 80 historical buildings. Taken from around the region, these were torn down and rebuilt here from their original parts.

The Village-Museum is laid out in the form of a row-village. This is a traditional form of settlement set along a stream going back to the year 1000 AD. The houses along Village Street (Dorfstraße) are rectangular in shape. They consist of a housing unit, a stable, an oblong shed and an out-building which also delineates the back side of the piece of property.

In addition to the main attraction of the buildings themselves some of the crafting buildings operate on weekends to give demonstrations of traditional rural crafts and techniques. In on the building complexes there are also farmyard animals.

== Typical Types of Houses ==
- Streckhof: The Streckhof (long, straight) type is the original form of house. The gabled side of the house faces the street. The rooms are laid out next to each other under one roof and each can be entered from the outside of the building.
- Zwerchhof: The Zwerchhof (L-shaped) type of house included a larger Streckhof-type structure with an adjacent row of stalls for livestock, each stall facing out onto a covered walkway. This is how the L-shaped floor plan developed.
- Doppelhakenhof: The Doppelhakenhof (U-shaped, lit. double-hook) type of house is a further development from the Zwerchhof. A large shed is attached to the row of stalls, creating a U-shaped floor plan.
- Kleinhäuslerhaus (lit. small house owned by a person of the ‘small house’ rank of society): This house is significantly younger than the classic styles of houses. It was the home of lower levels of society and often consisted of only one structure. It looked like the main part of a farmhouse.
