= Donaustadtbrücke station =

Vienna U-Bahn station

Donaustadtbrücke
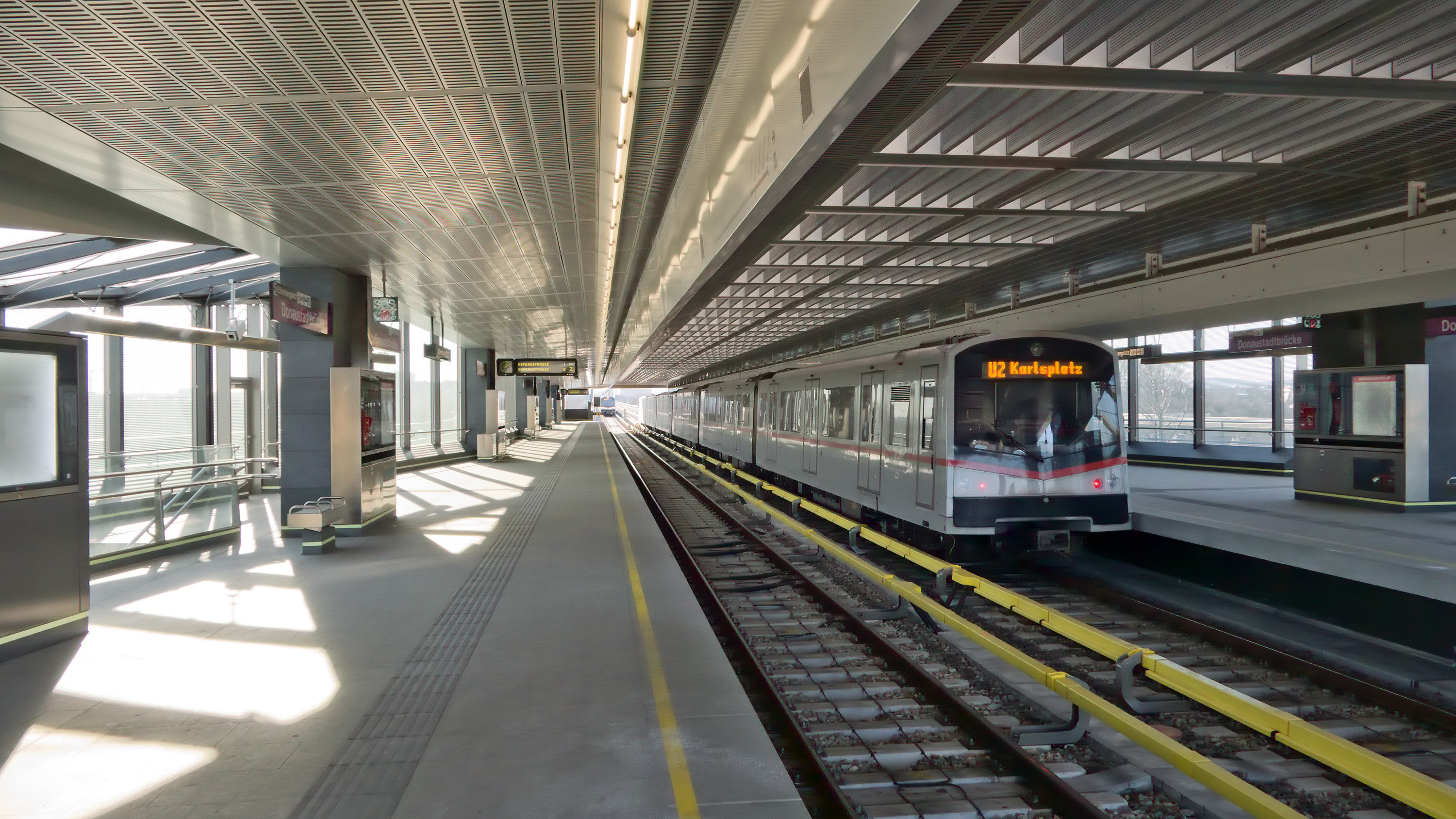

General information
- Location: Donaustadt, Vienna; Austria
- Coordinates: 48.2117°N 16.4400°E
- Line: P+R
- Bus routes: 92A, 92B, 93A, N90, N91

History
- Opened: 2 October 2010

Services
Preceding station	Wiener Linien	Following station
Donaumarina toward Karlsplatz	U2	Stadlau toward Seestadt
Location

Donaustadtbrücke is a station on the U2 of the Vienna U-Bahn. It is located in Donaustadt, the 22nd district of Vienna. The station was opened in 2010 as part of the third expansion of the U2 between Stadion and Aspernstraße.

== About ==
The station was opened on 2 October 2010 as part of the third extension of the U2 line between Stadion and Aspernstraße, crossing the Danube over the Donaustadtbrücke, after which the station is named. In the planning phase, the station was referred to by the working title "Seestern".

It has two tracks and features one side platform for each direction. The station is situated in close proximity to the Kaisermühlen motorway interchange, connecting the Donauufer Autobahn (A22) with the Südosttangente Wien (A23) motorway. The station is equipped with lifts and escalators, ensuring full accessibility. It is served by the Wiener Linien bus lines 92A, 92B, and 93A, as well as the night buses N90 and N91.

Following the opening of the Donaustadtbrücke station, passenger numbers at the nearby S-Bahn station Lobau declined significantly, leading to its closure in December 2014.

== Art ==
In 2013, Portuguese artist Pedro Cabrita Reis created an installation at the station, painting part of the north wall in orange-red and white concrete paint and adding a light rod about 10 meters high. A similar design was also applied at the neighboring Donaumarina station. According to the artist, the work represents "an ideal crossing of the Danube – a second, artistic kind of bridge".

== Gallery ==
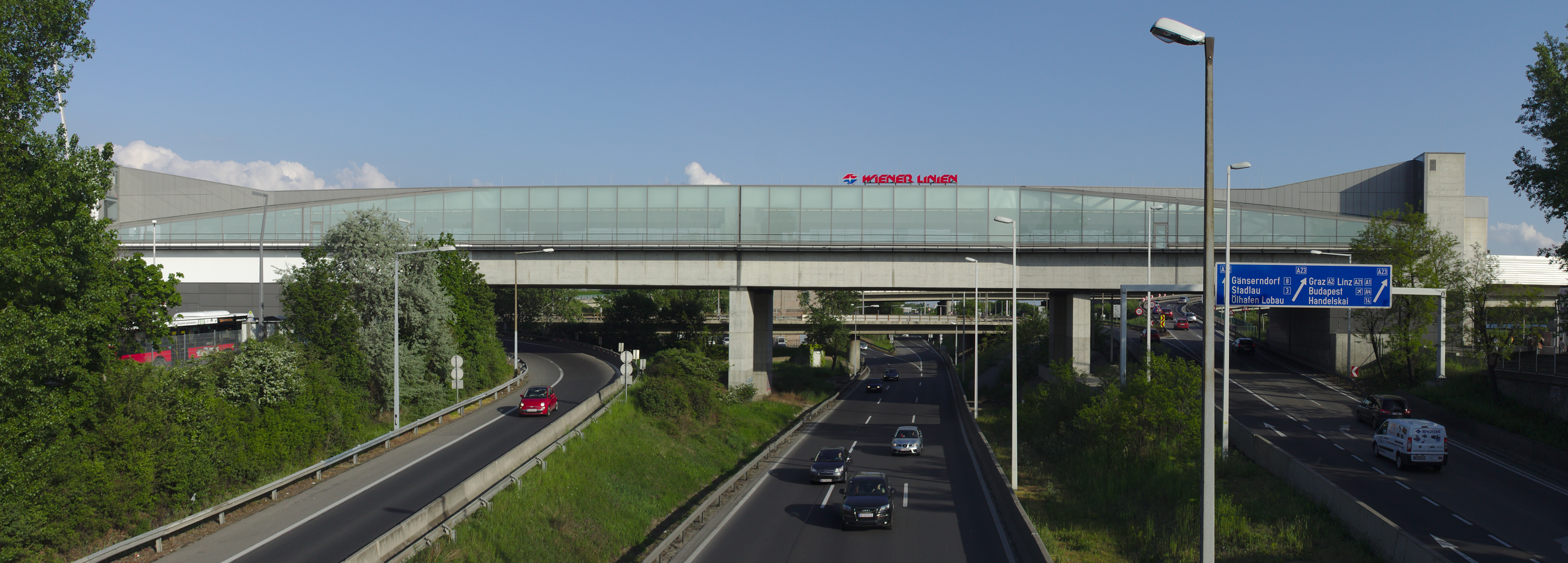
The station over the motorway

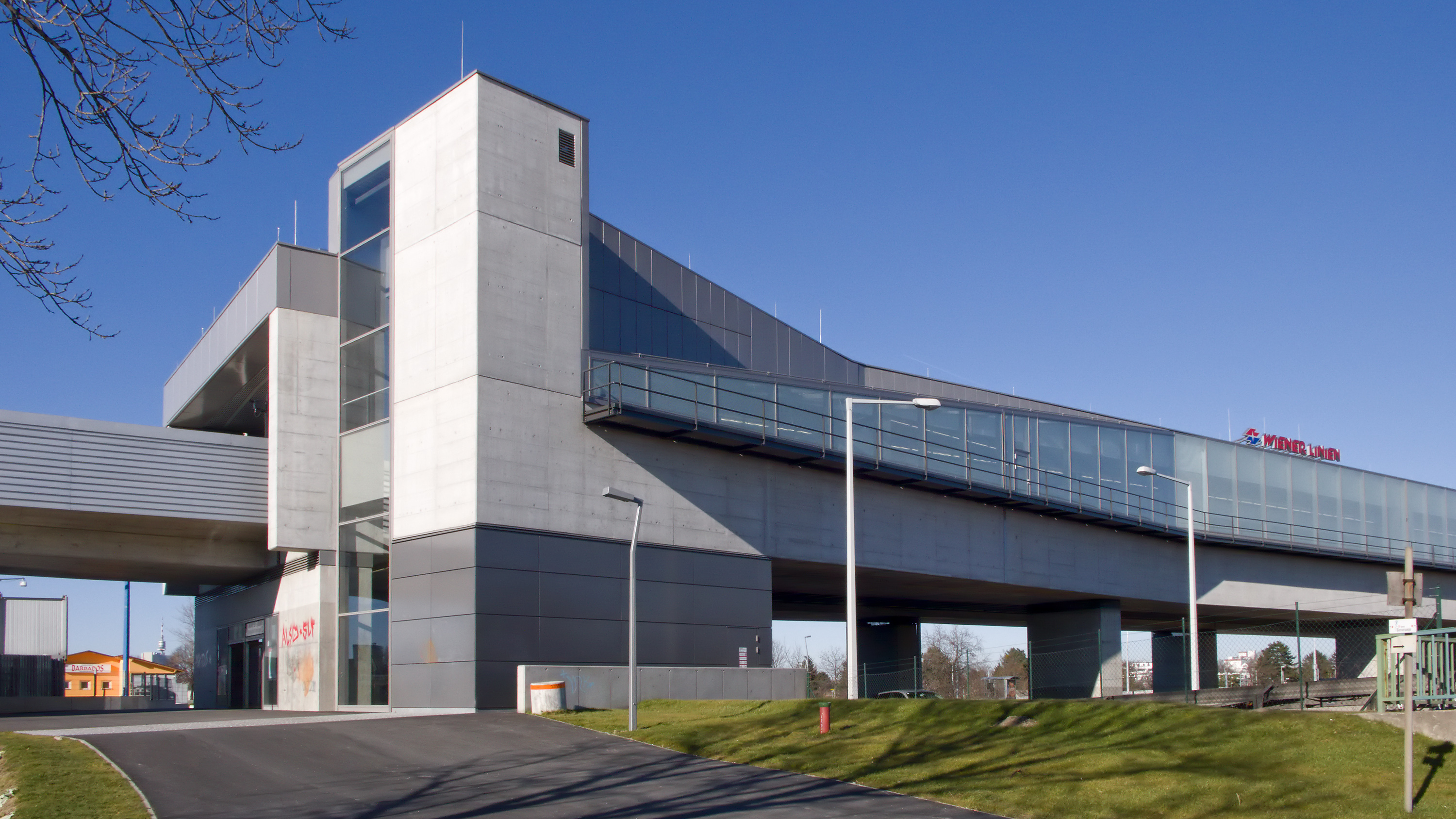
The entrance by the Danube

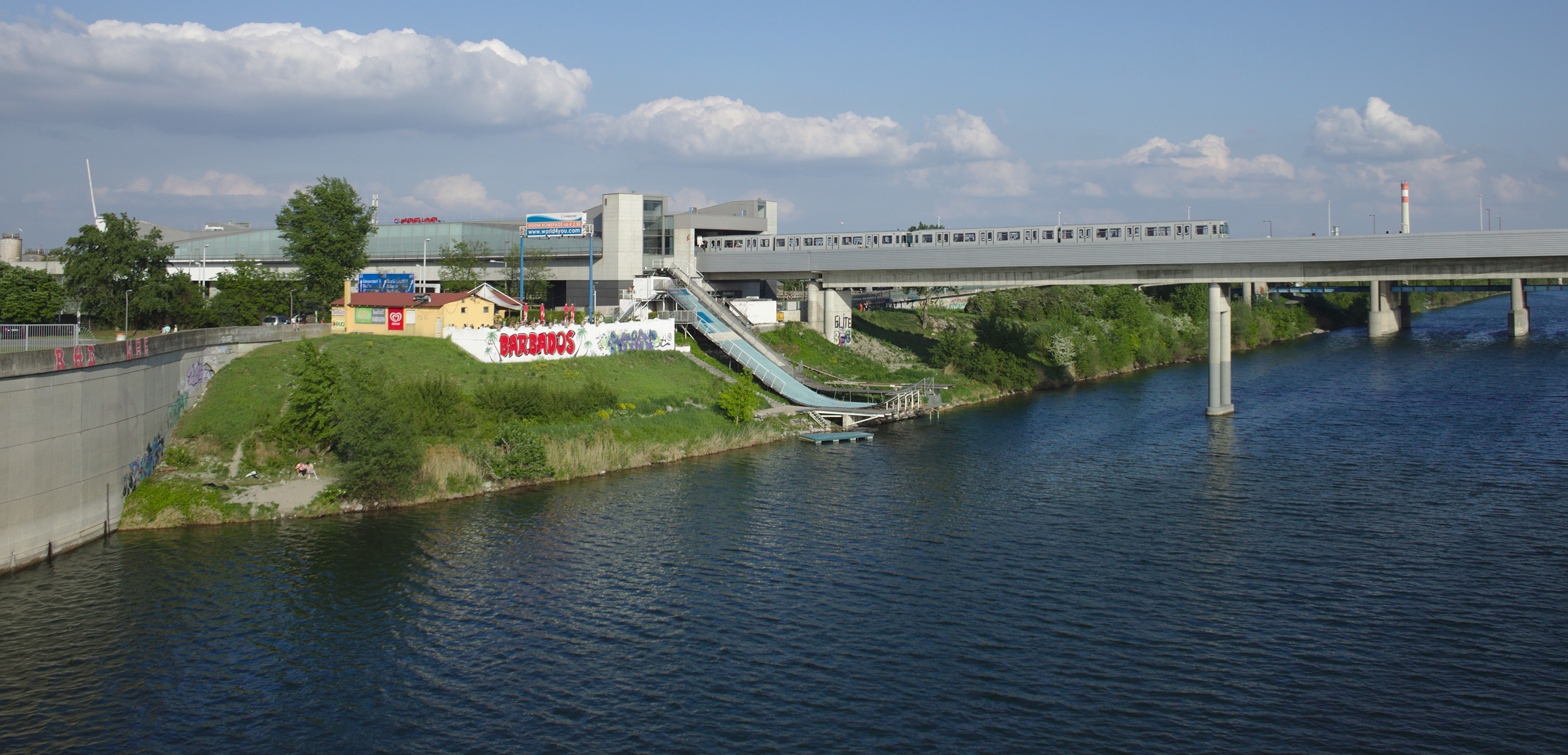
The station from the Danube

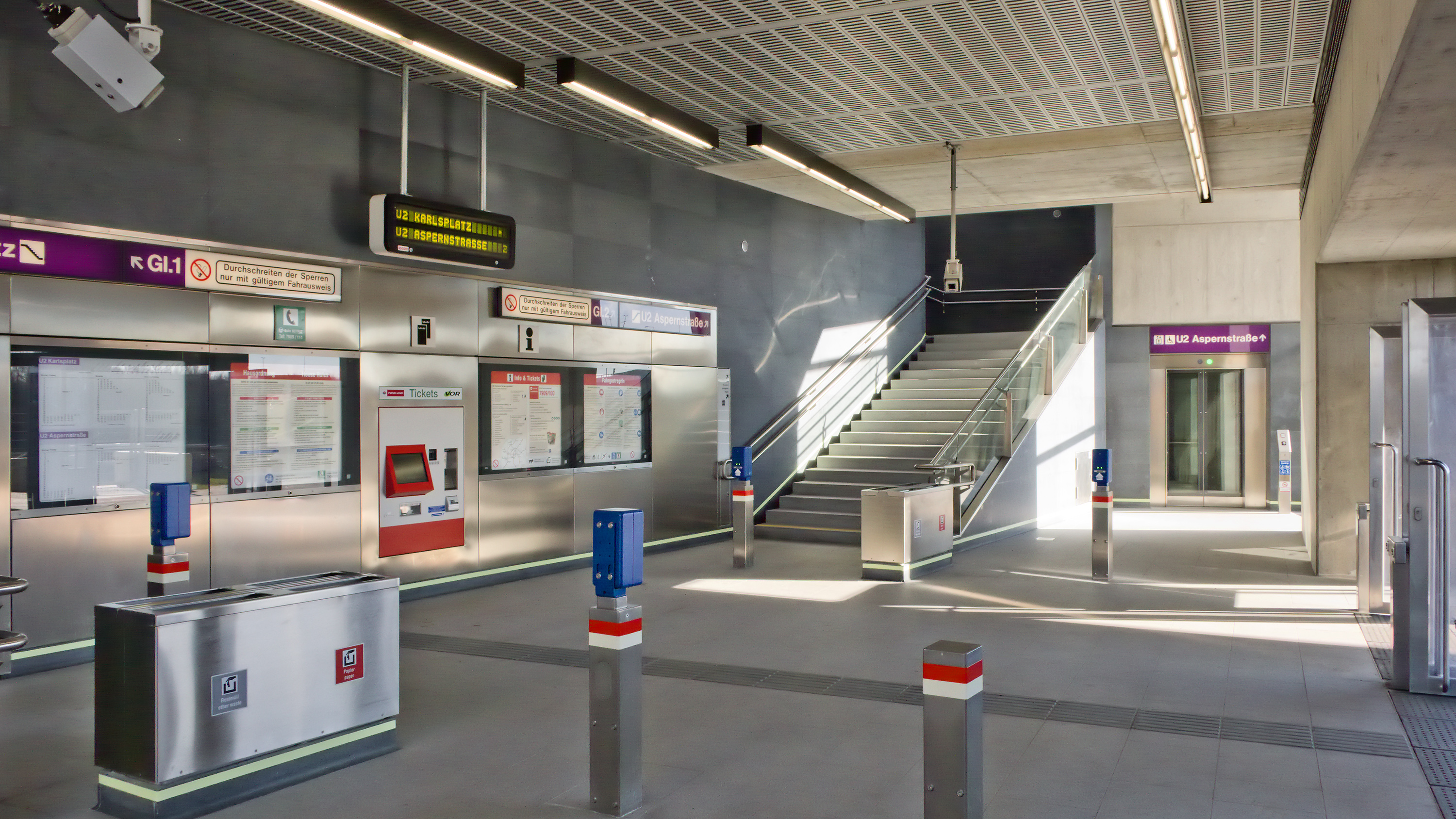
The interior

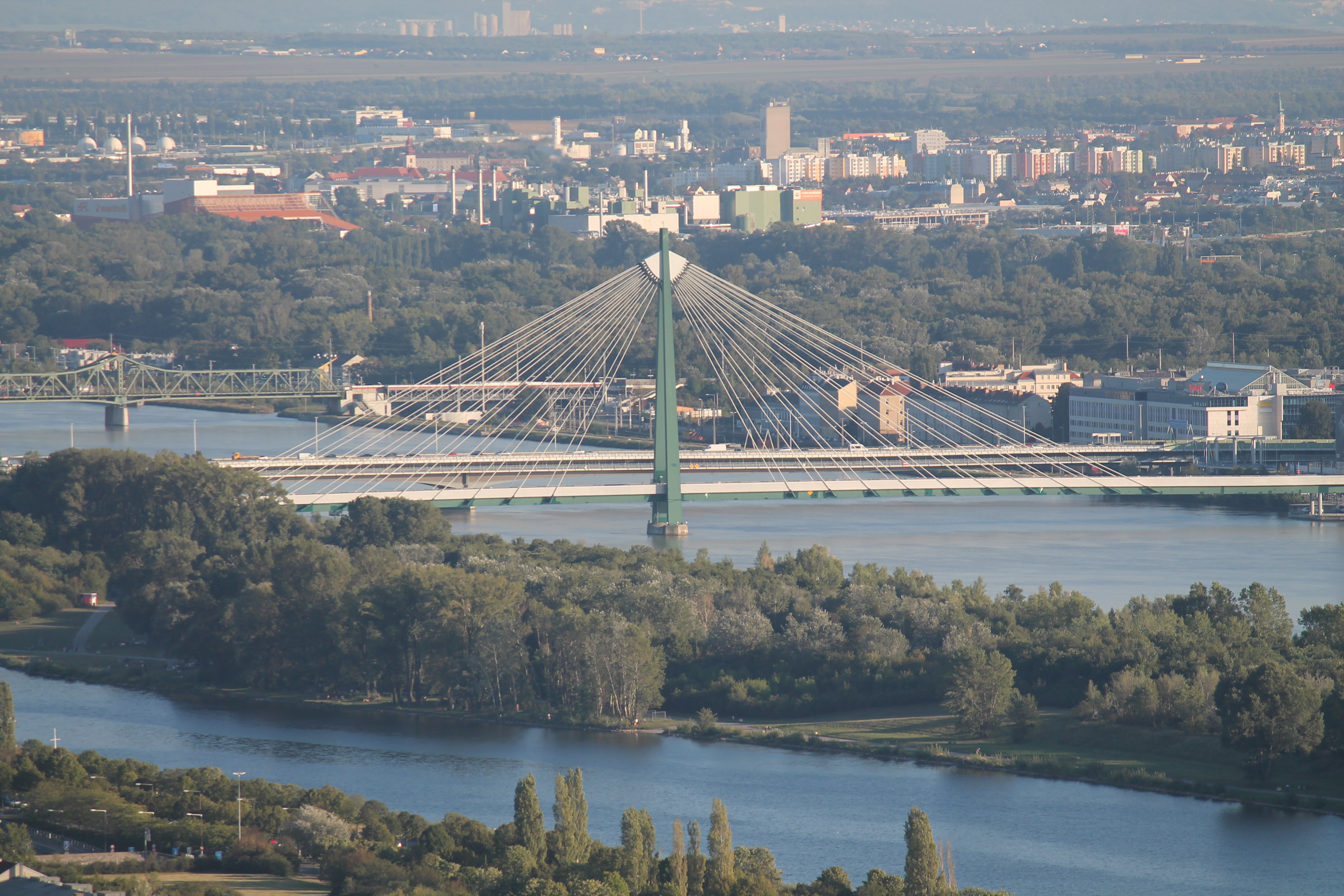
The Donaustadtbrücke

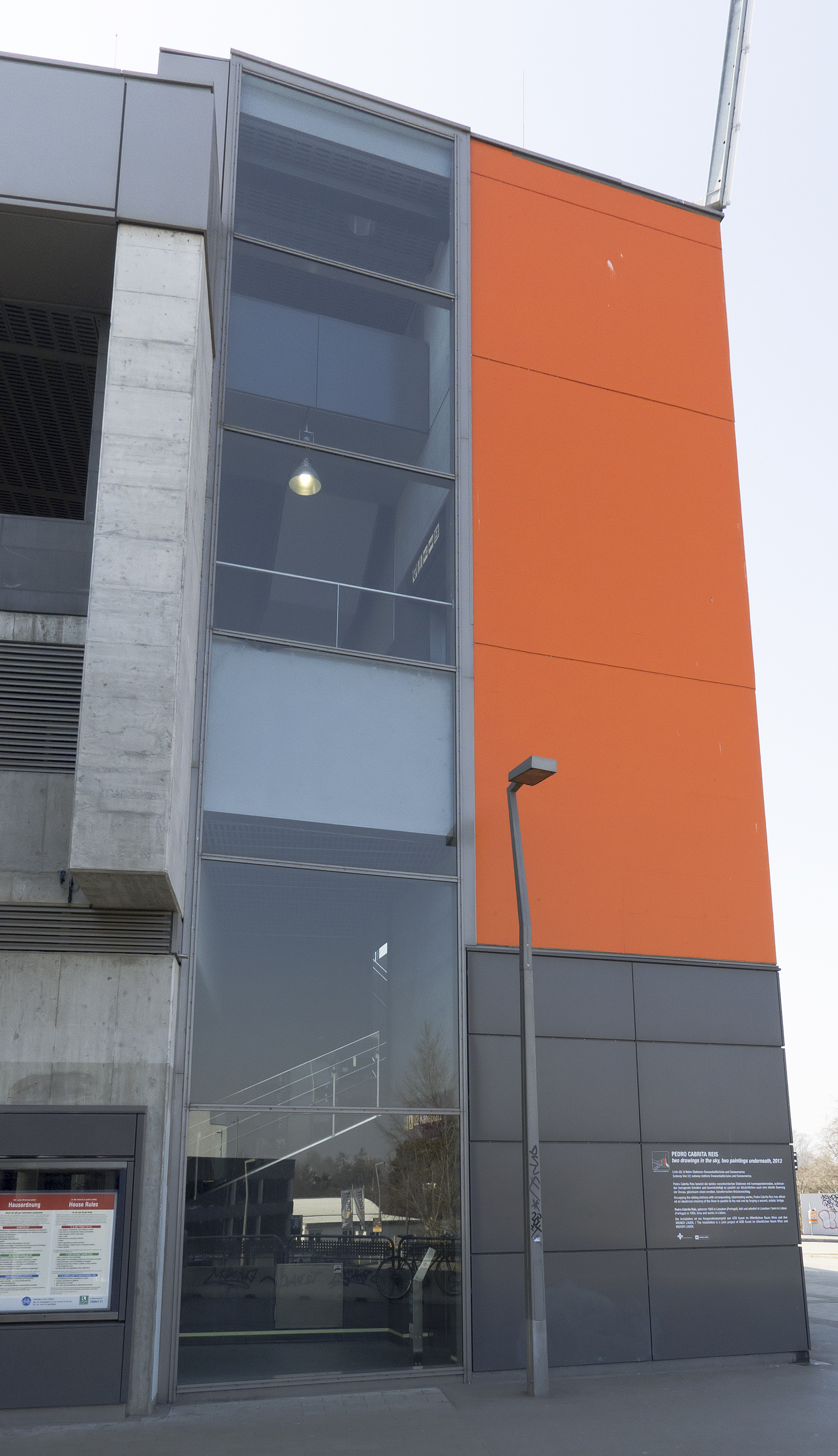
Public art by Pedro Cabrita Reis

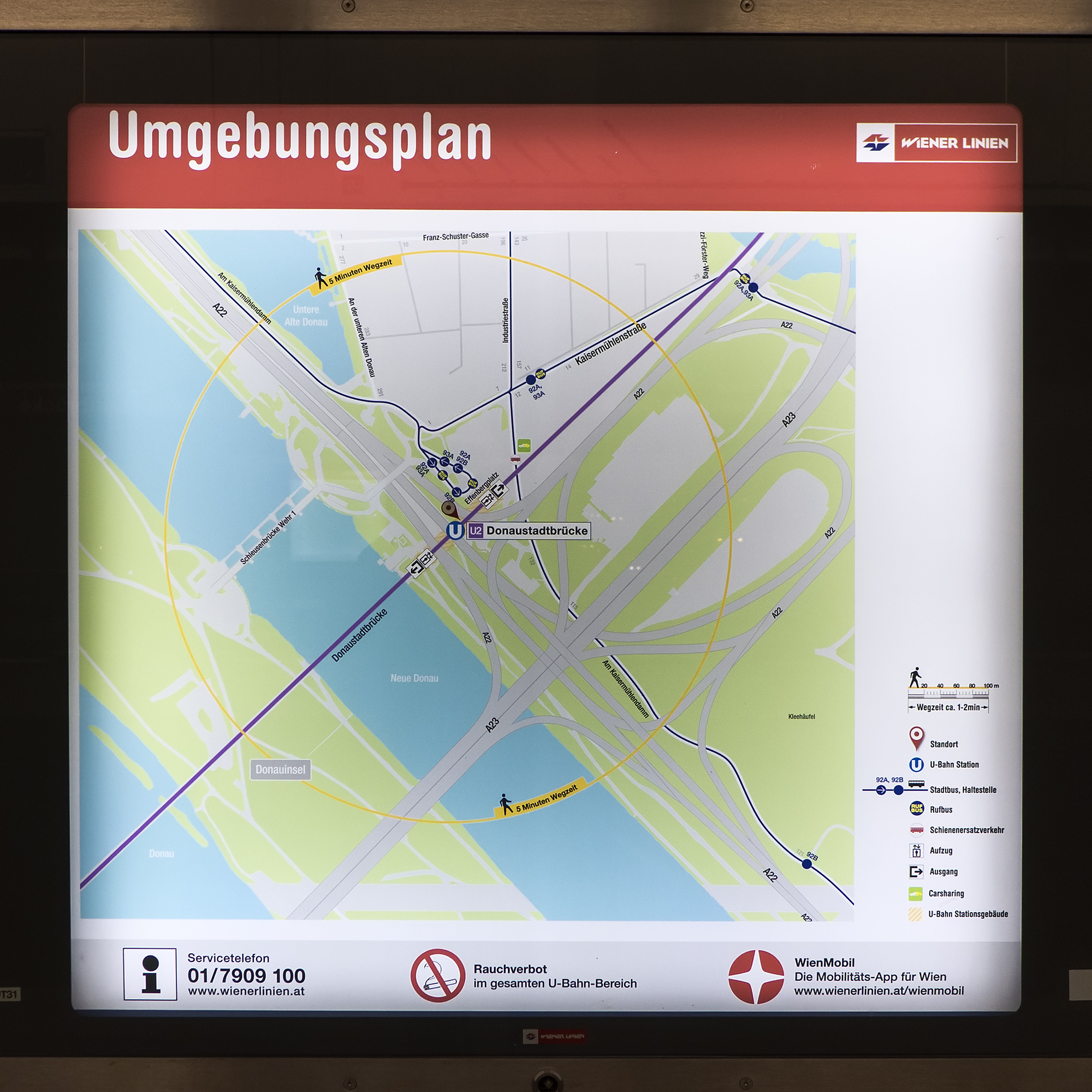
Map of the surrounding area
