= Messe-Prater station =

Vienna U-Bahn station

Messe-Prater
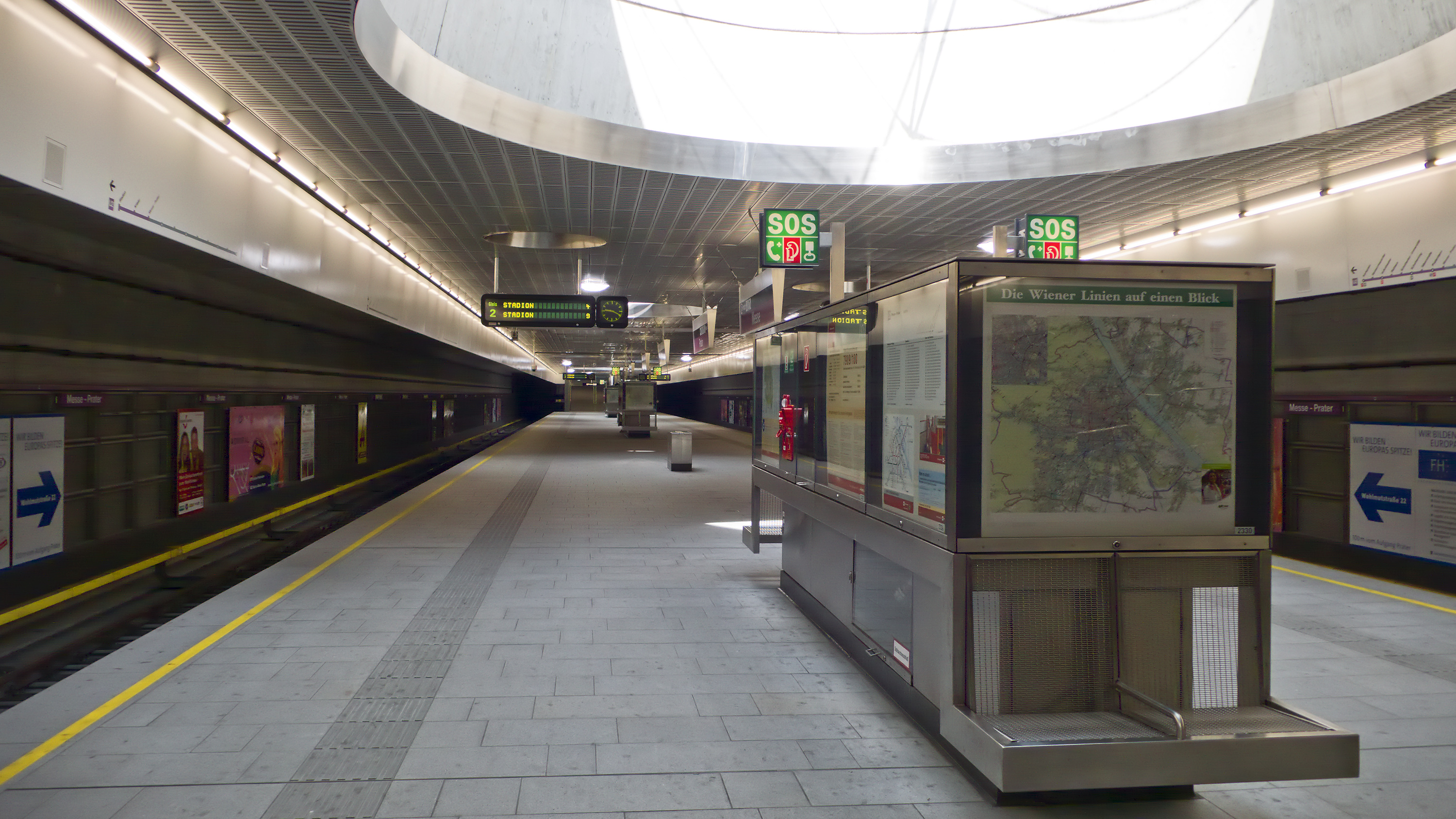

General information
- Location: Leopoldstadt, Vienna; Austria
- Coordinates: 48.2179°N 16.4056°E

History
- Opened: 2008

Services
Preceding station	Wiener Linien	Following station
Praterstern toward Karlsplatz	U2	Krieau toward Seestadt
Location

Messe-Prater is a station on the U2 of the Vienna U-Bahn. It is located in Leopoldstadt, Vienna's 2nd district. The station opened in May 2008 as part of the second extension of the U2.

== About ==
The station takes its name from the Messe Wien exhibition and congress centre and the nearby Prater. It is the last subterranean station on the line heading eastwards.
