= Krieau station =

Vienna U-Bahn station

Krieau
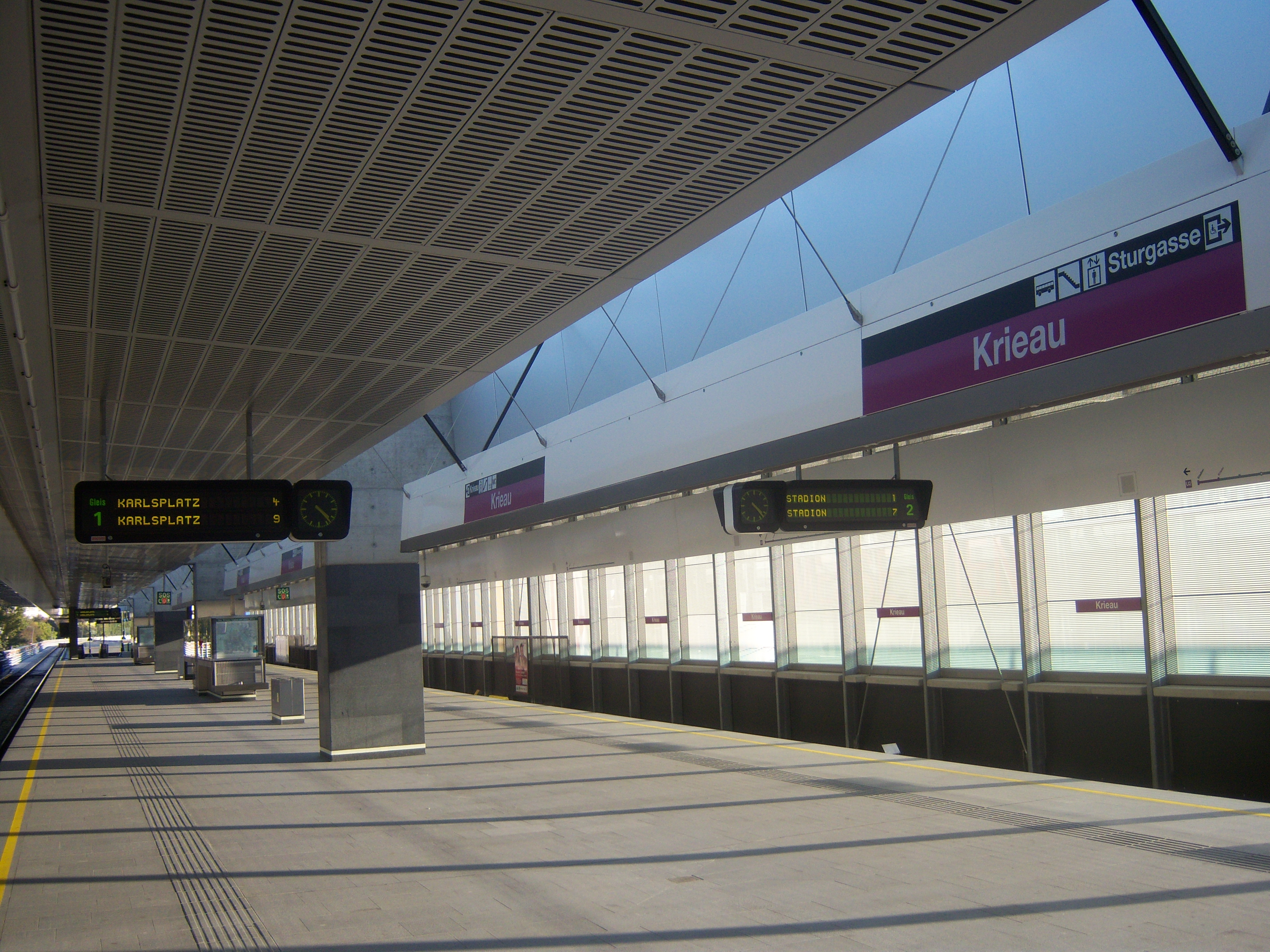

General information
- Location: Leopoldstadt, Vienna; Austria
- Coordinates: 48.2147°N 16.4137°E
- Bus routes: 82A

History
- Opened: 2008

Services
Preceding station	Wiener Linien	Following station
Messe-Prater toward Karlsplatz	U2	Stadion toward Seestadt
Location

Krieau is a metro station on the U2 of the Vienna U-Bahn. It is located in Leopoldstadt, Vienna's 2nd district. The station opened in May 2008 as part of the eastern extension of the U2. It serves the Messe Wien and the University of Economics and Business. Station was originally to be named Trabrennstraße, but the planned name was changed in 2006, two years before the station opened.

== About ==
The station was opened on 10 May 2008 as part of the second phase of the U2 extension from Schottenring. It was originally going to be named Trabrennstraße. The station is an elevated structure featuring an island platform and is equipped with lifts. It serves the new campus of the University of Economics and Business, which was built in 2009.

The station connects to the bus line 82A.

== Artwork ==
In October 2013, the French graffiti artist Honet was commissioned by Wiener Linien and KÖR Kunst im öffentlichen Raum (Public Art Vienna) to create an artwork on 14 concrete pillars of the station's elevated metro track. His work titled Totem Modern shows the faces of cartoon superheroes and sci-fi characters of the 1970s, reflecting the "erstwhile function of columns as historically and religiously charged objects from a present-day point of view" turning them into "cult objects".

Honet was followed in April 2014 by the Brazilian graffiti artist Speto who created an artwork titled 3 Brothers dedicated to the Villas-Bôas brothers on another 14 concrete pillars of the metro track. Honoring the brothers' legacy as champions for the indigenous population of the Amazon basin, Speto adorned the subway pillars with characters from Brazilian mythology like Boitatá, Iara or Boto and tribal pattern designs employing graphic styles of the Brazilian Literatura de Cordel.

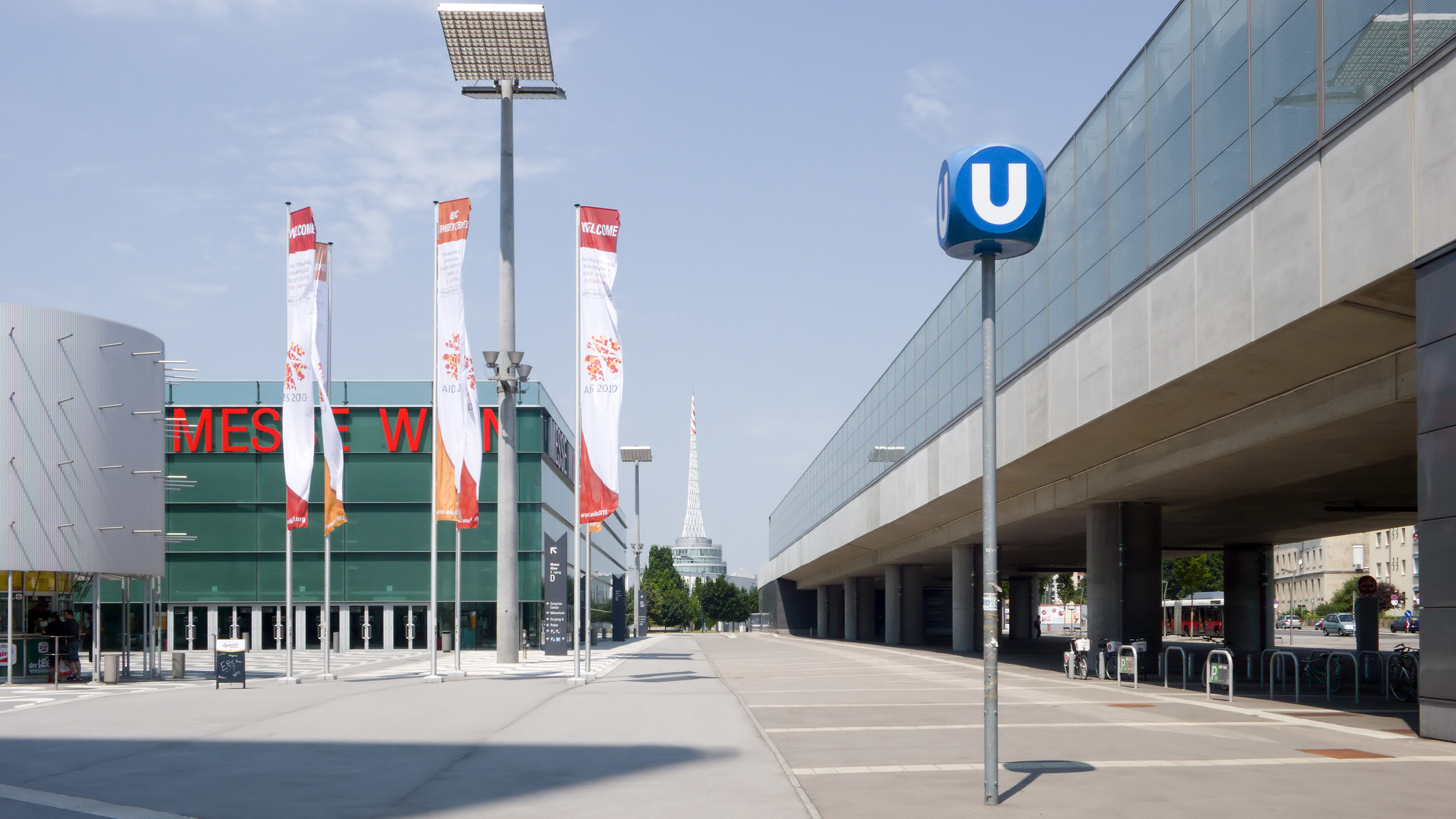
Outside the station

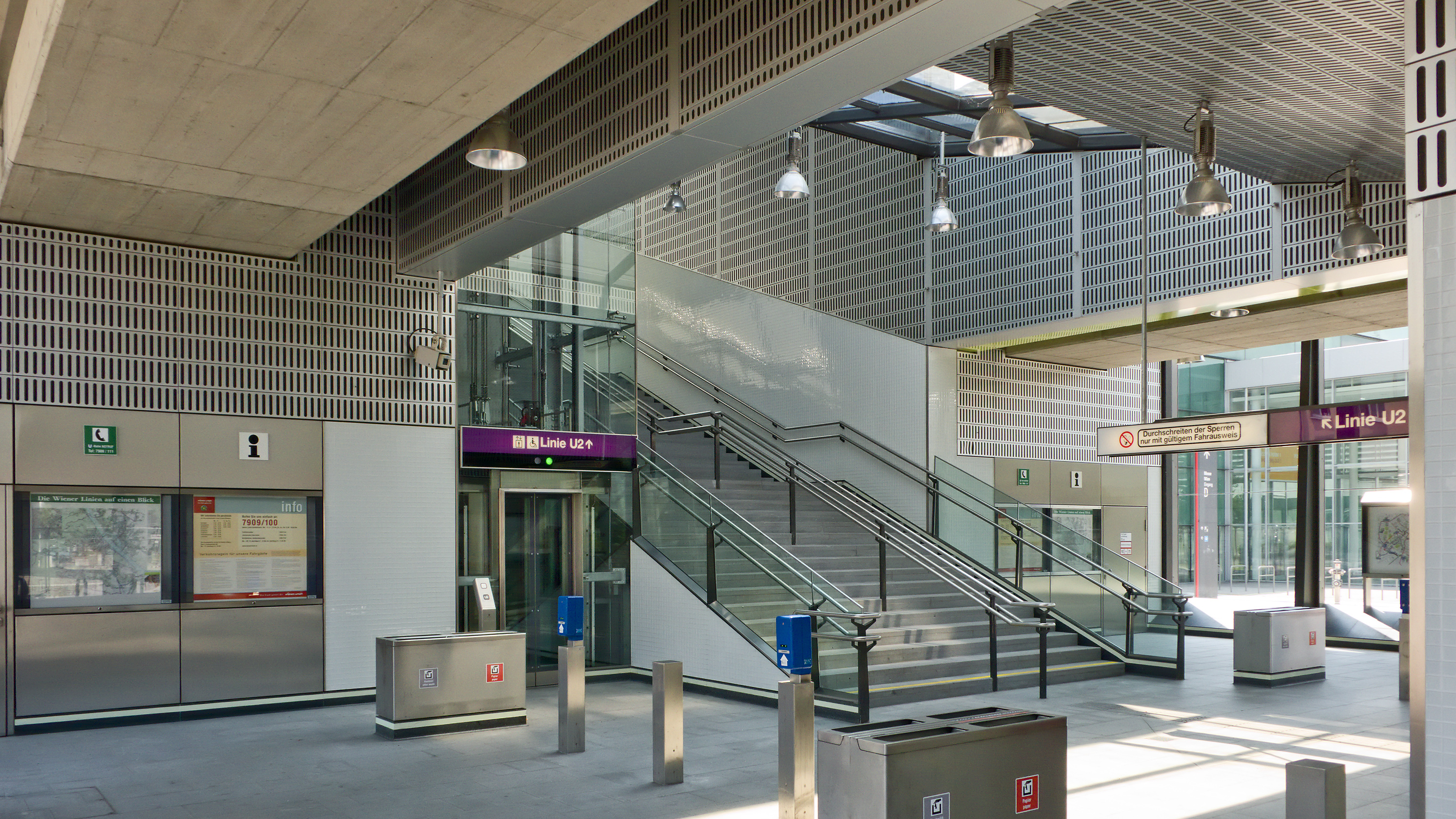
Interior

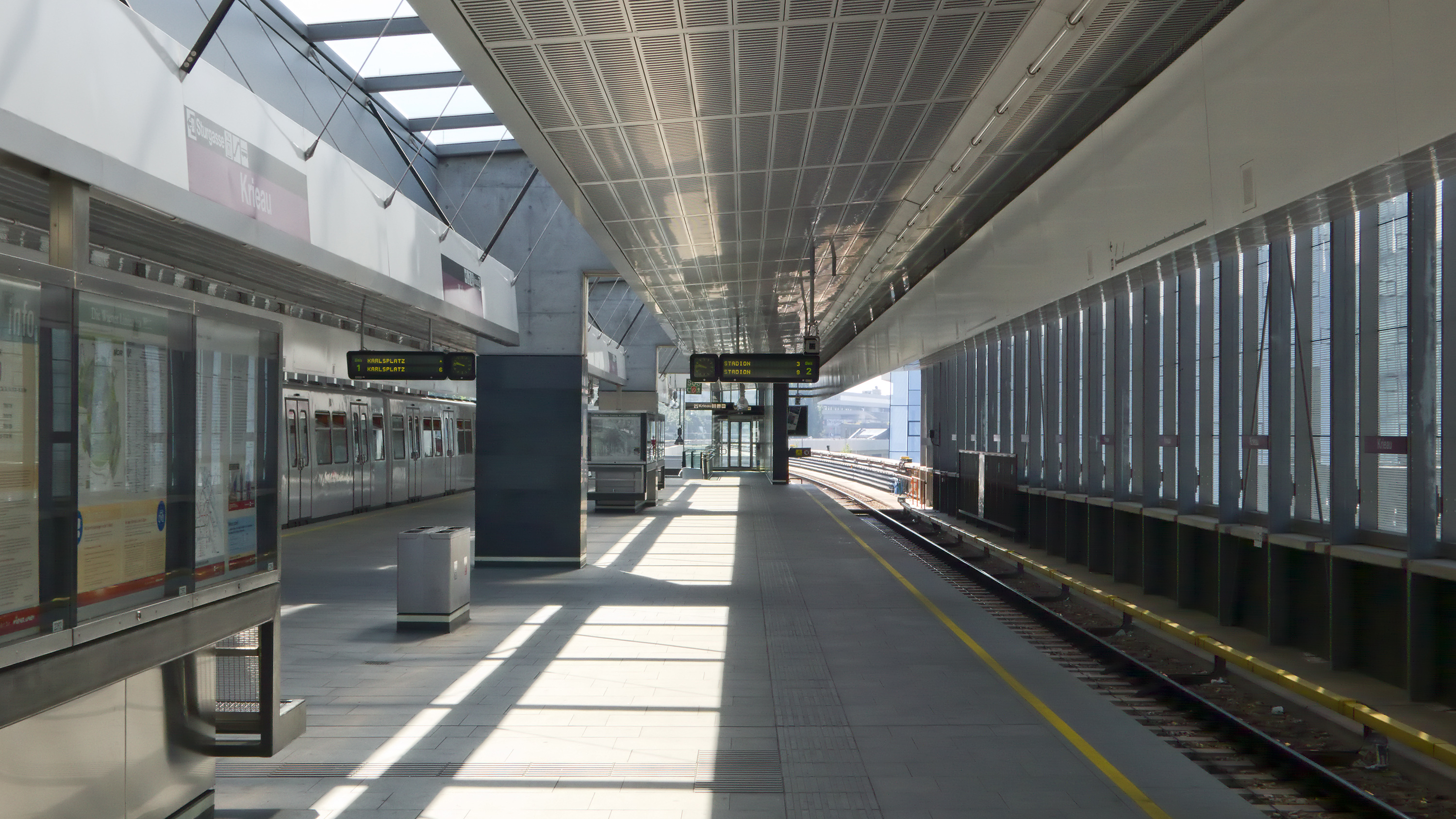
The platform

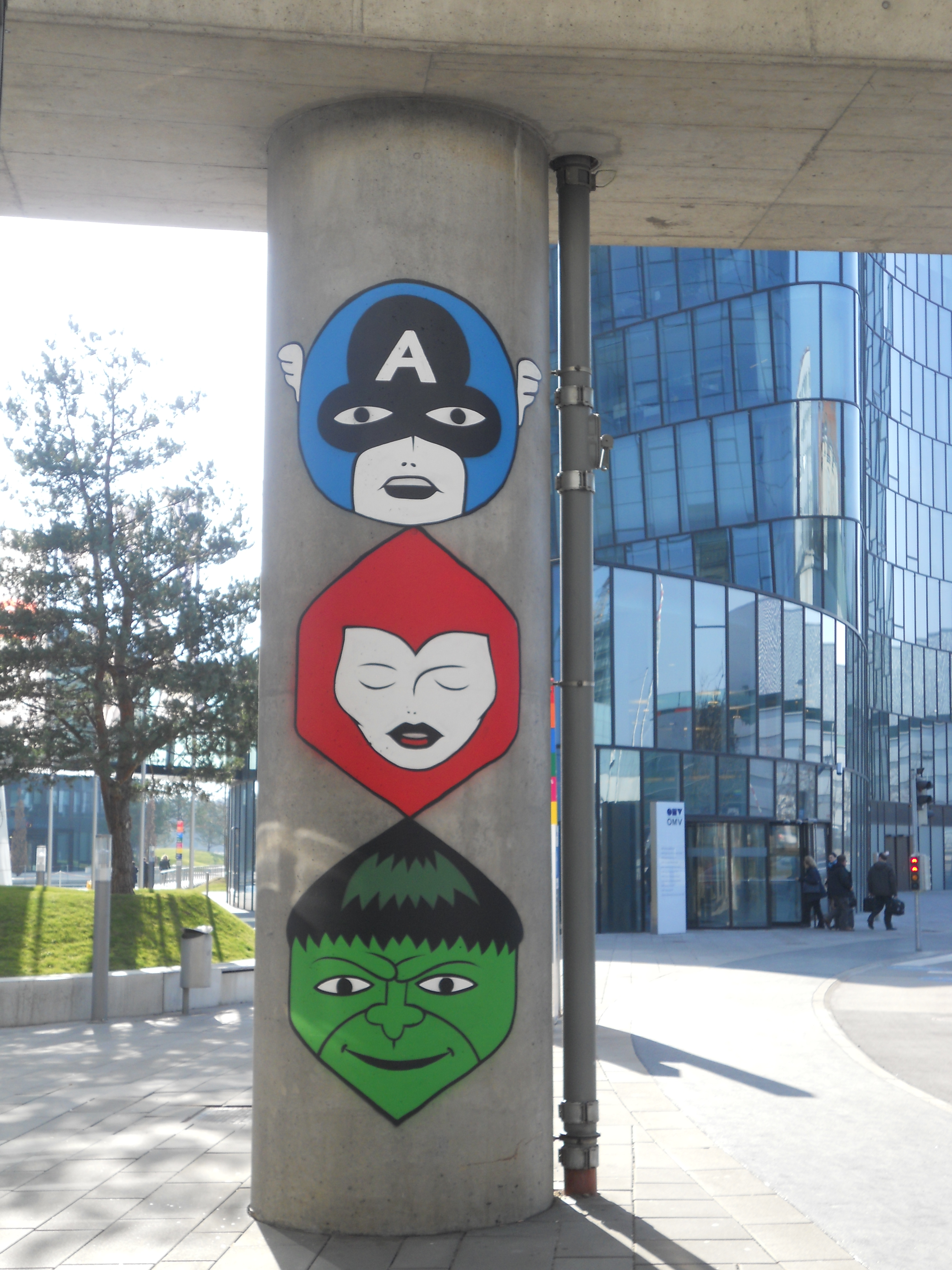
Column of Totem Modern

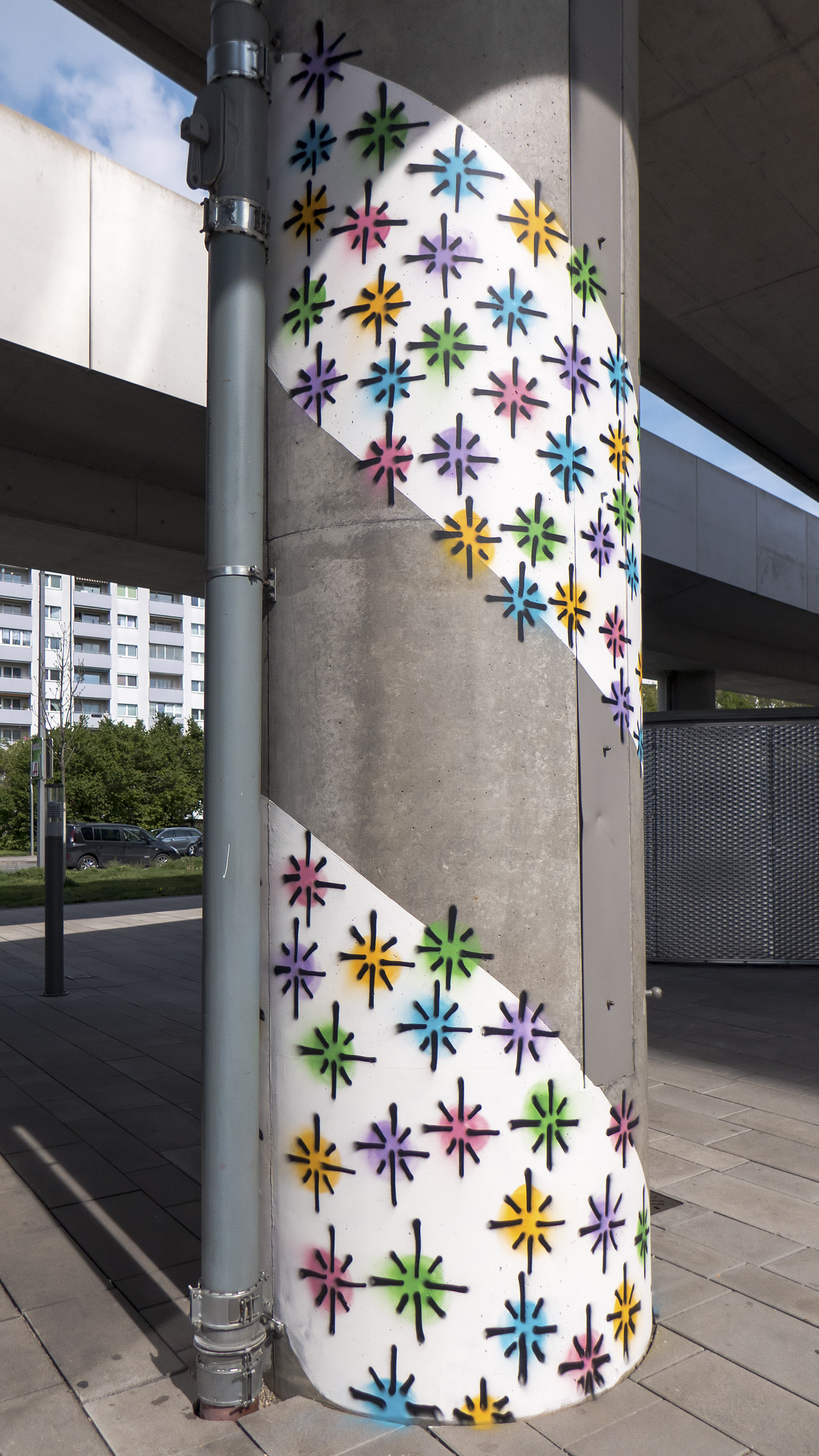
Pattern design by Honet

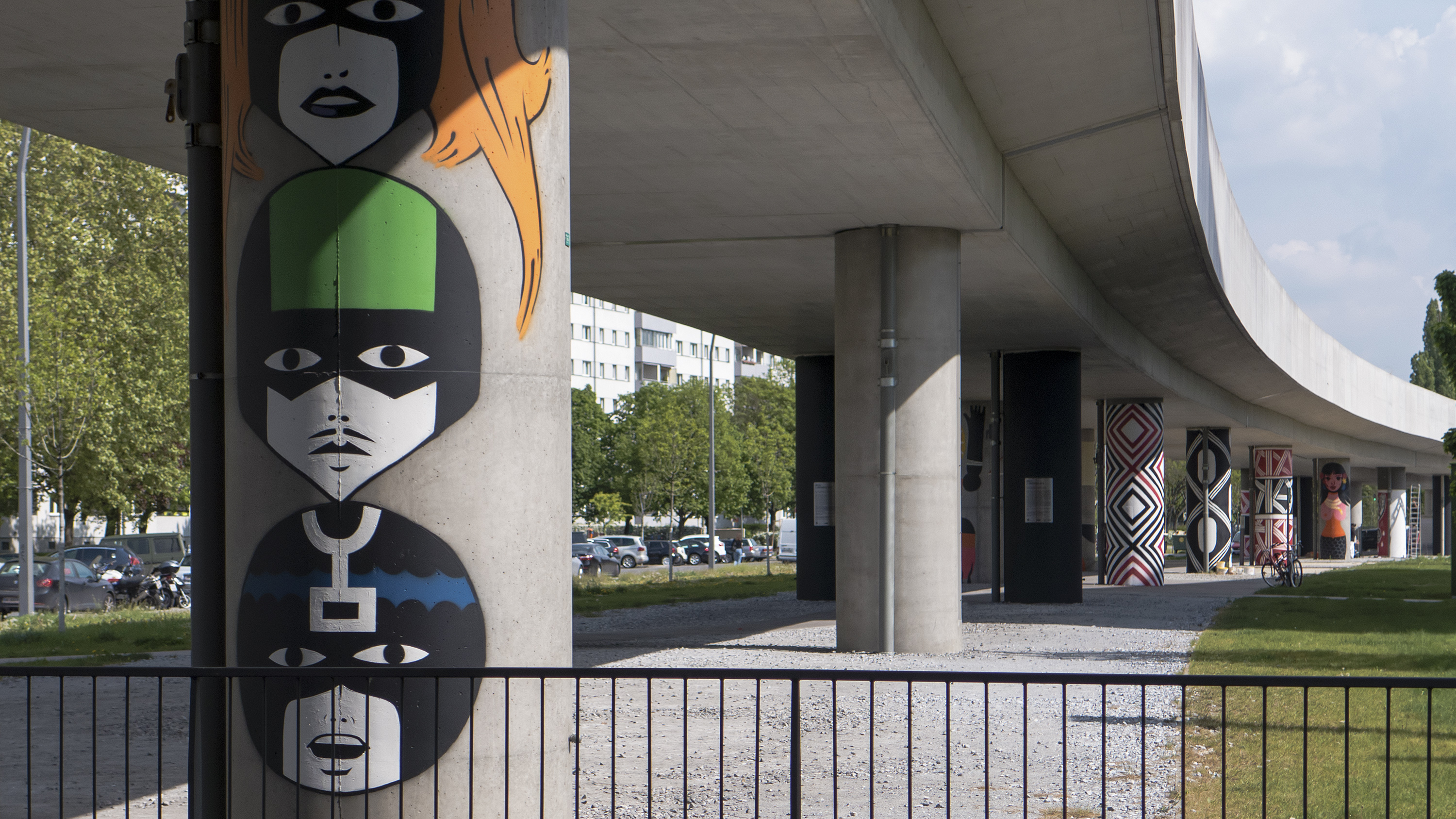
Honet (left) and Speto (rear)

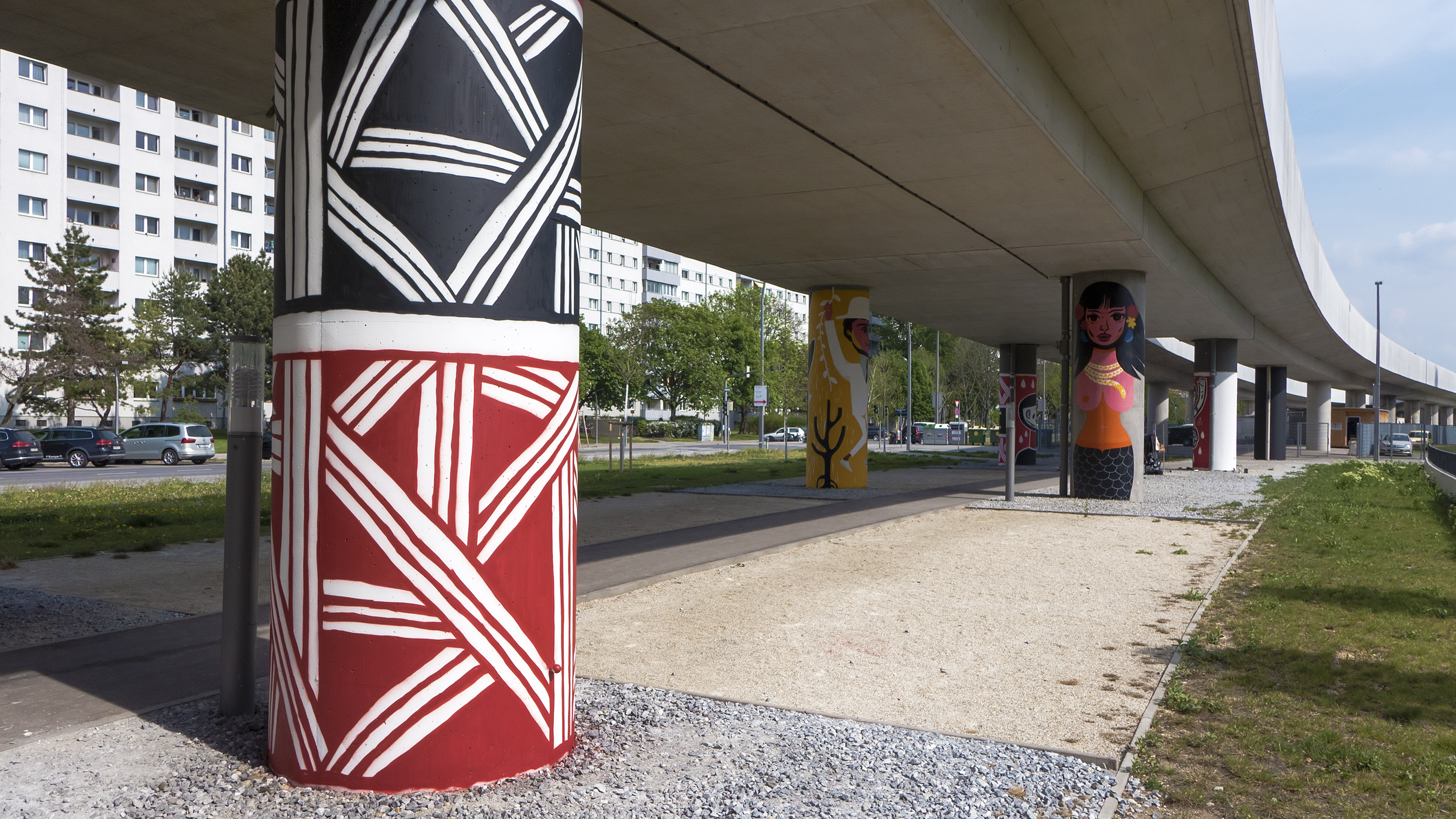
3 Brothers

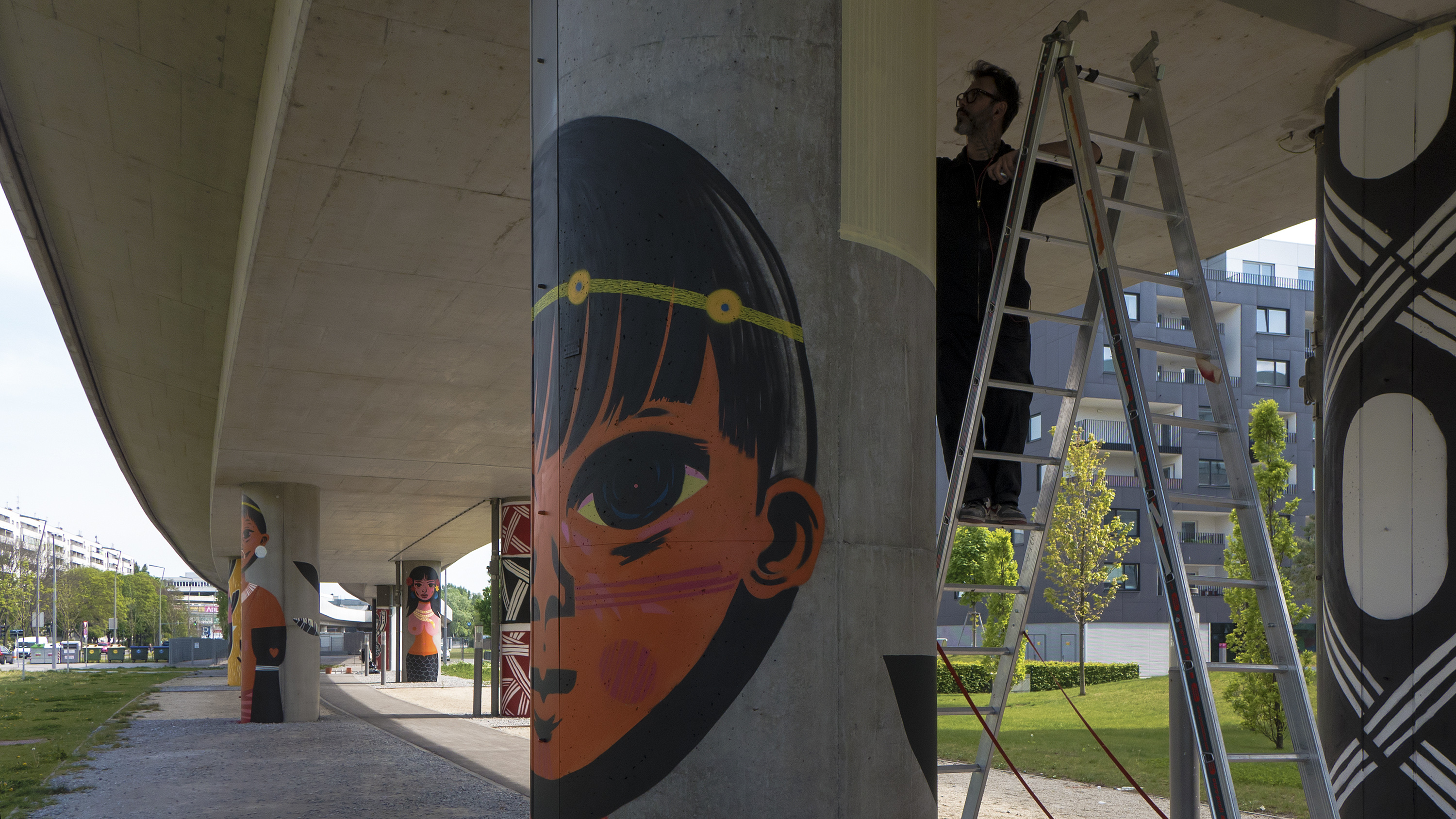
Speto working on the painting of a Matsés child

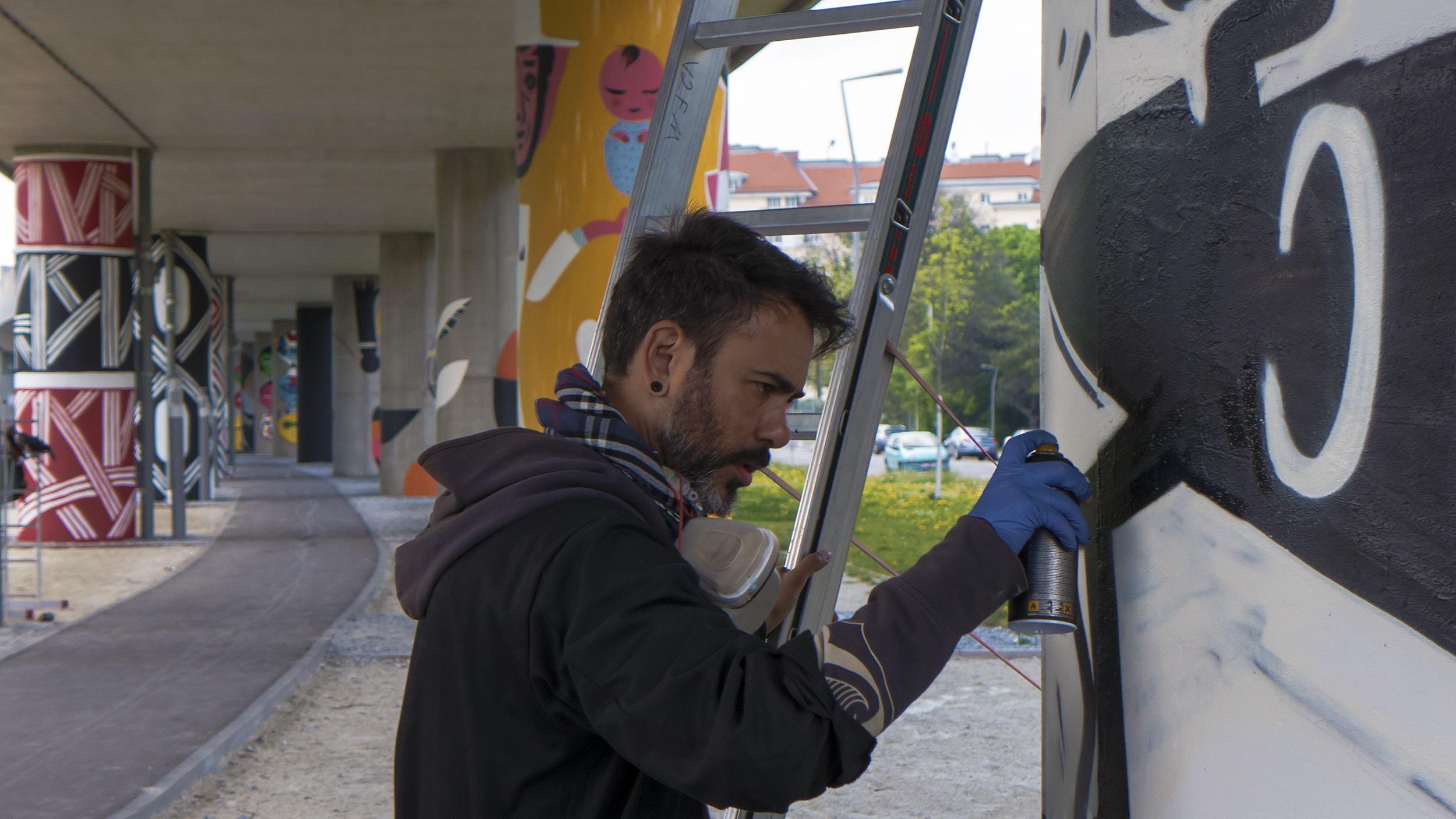
Speto spray painting details

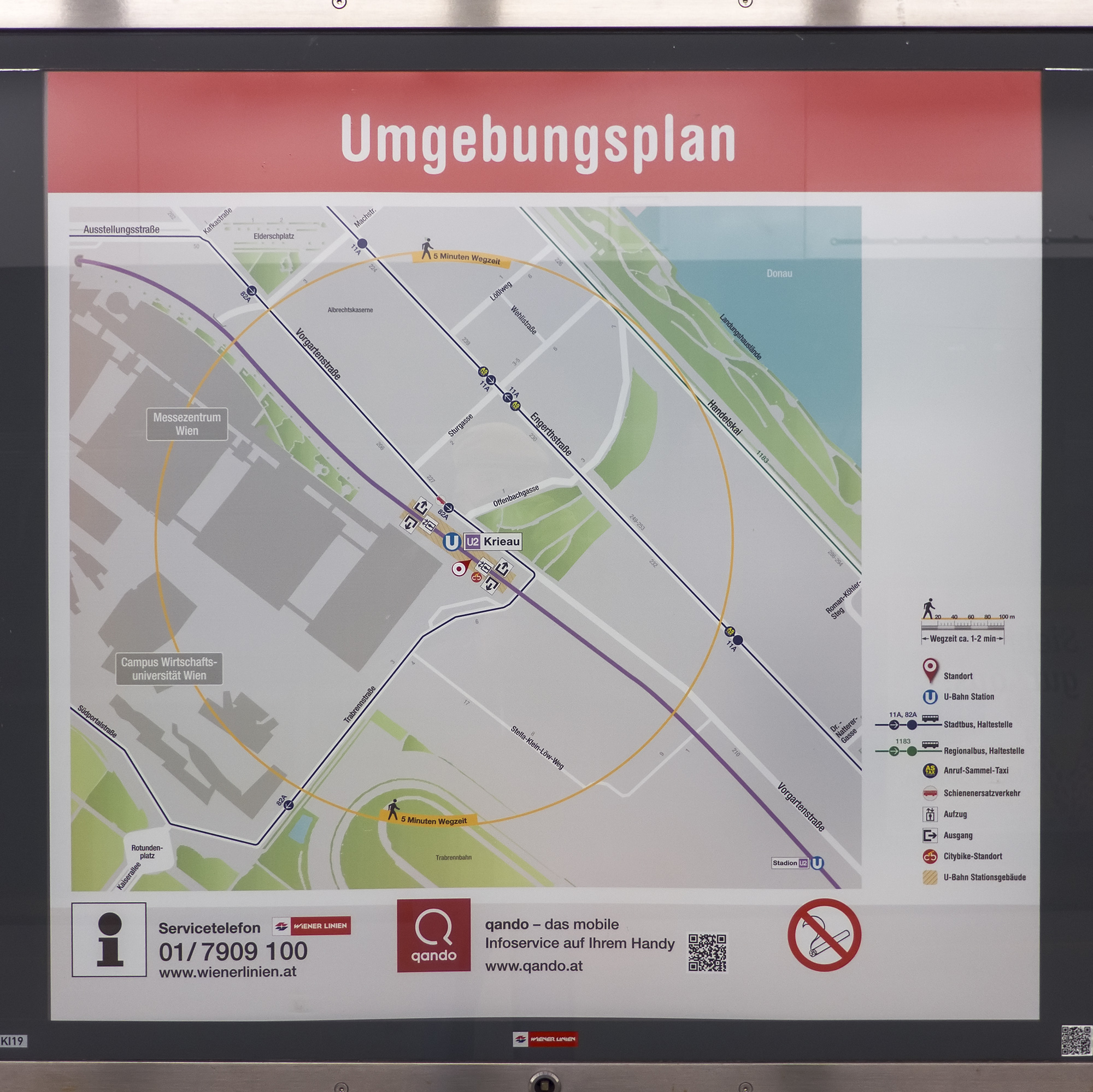
Map of the surrounding area
