= Donaumarina station =

Vienna U-Bahn station

Donaumarina
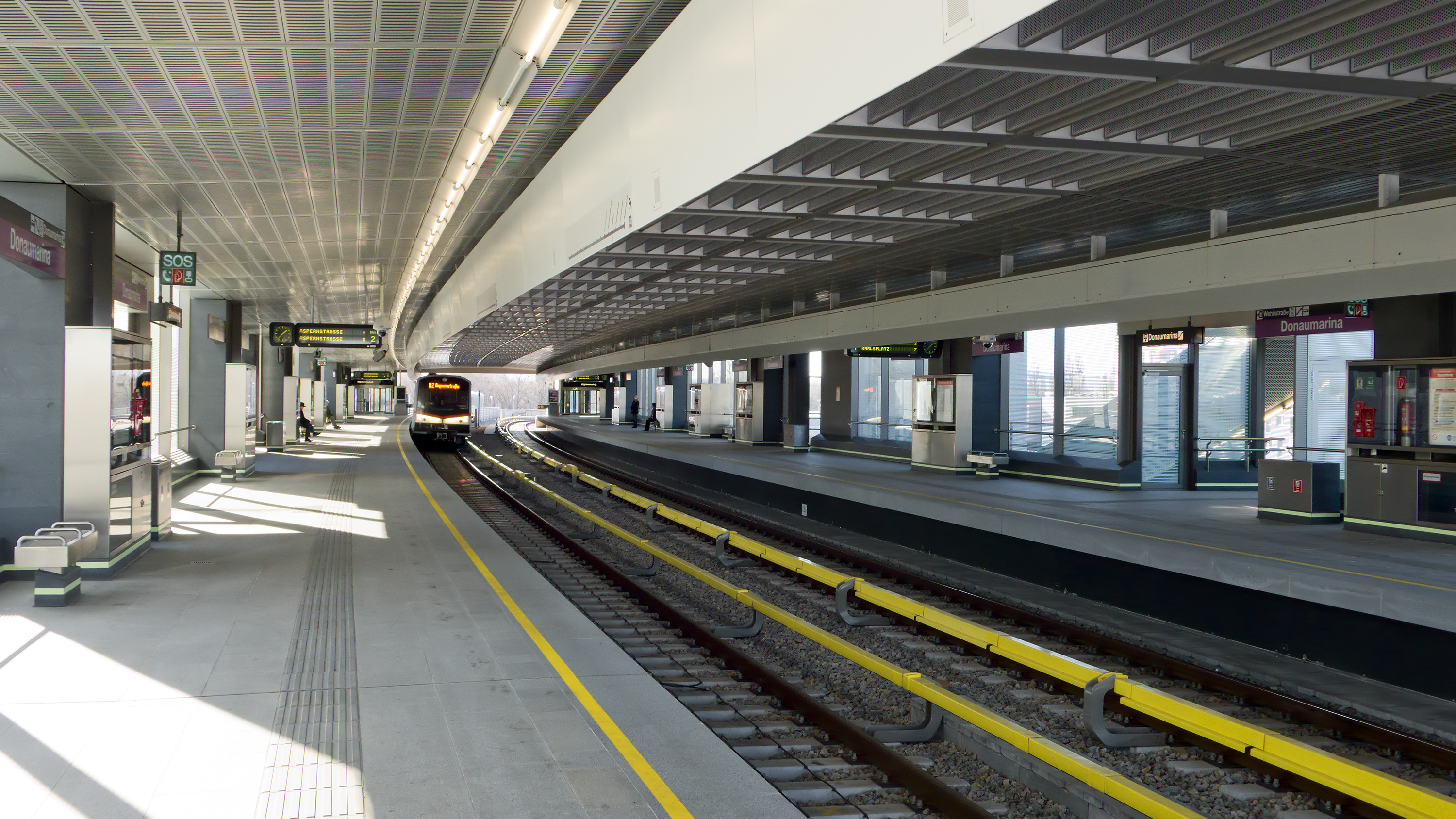

General information
- Location: Leopoldstadt, Vienna; Austria
- Coordinates: 48.2065°N 16.4317°E
- Connections: 77A, 79A, 79B

History
- Opened: 2 October 2010

Services
Preceding station	Wiener Linien	Following station
Stadion toward Karlsplatz	U2	Donaustadtbrücke toward Seestadt
Location

Donaumarina is a station on the U2 of the Vienna U-Bahn. It is located in Leopoldstadt, the 2nd district of Vienna. The station was opened in 2010 as part of the third expansion of the U2, which extended to line eastwards between Stadion and Aspernstraße.

== About ==
Donaumarina station, opened on 2 October 2010, is the first station on the newly extended section of the U2 line between Stadion and Aspernstraße. Located on the right bank of the Danube, the station sits above the Handelskai and is the final U2 stop on the west side of the river. From there, the line crosses the Danube via the Donaustadtbrücke, a bridge used exclusively by the U-Bahn. The station is named after the nearby Marina Wien boat harbor and features two tracks, each served by a side platform. One exit leads to the Danube riverbank, while the second access leads to Wehlistraße, where the headquarters of the Austrian Trade Union Federation is located.

The station is served by the Wiener Linien bus lines 77A, 79A, and 79B.

The Wiener Waterfront around the Donaumarina station is an area along the river being developed with residential, commercial, and recreational spaces, including the Marina Tower, which will be Austria's tallest residential building at the time of its completion.

== Art ==
In 2013, Portuguese artist Pedro Cabrita Reis created an installation at the station, painting part of the north wall in orange-red and white concrete paint and adding a light rod about 10 meters high. A similar design was also applied at the neighboring Donaustadtbrücke station. According to the artist, the work represents "an ideal crossing of the Danube – a second, artistic kind of bridge".

== Gallery ==
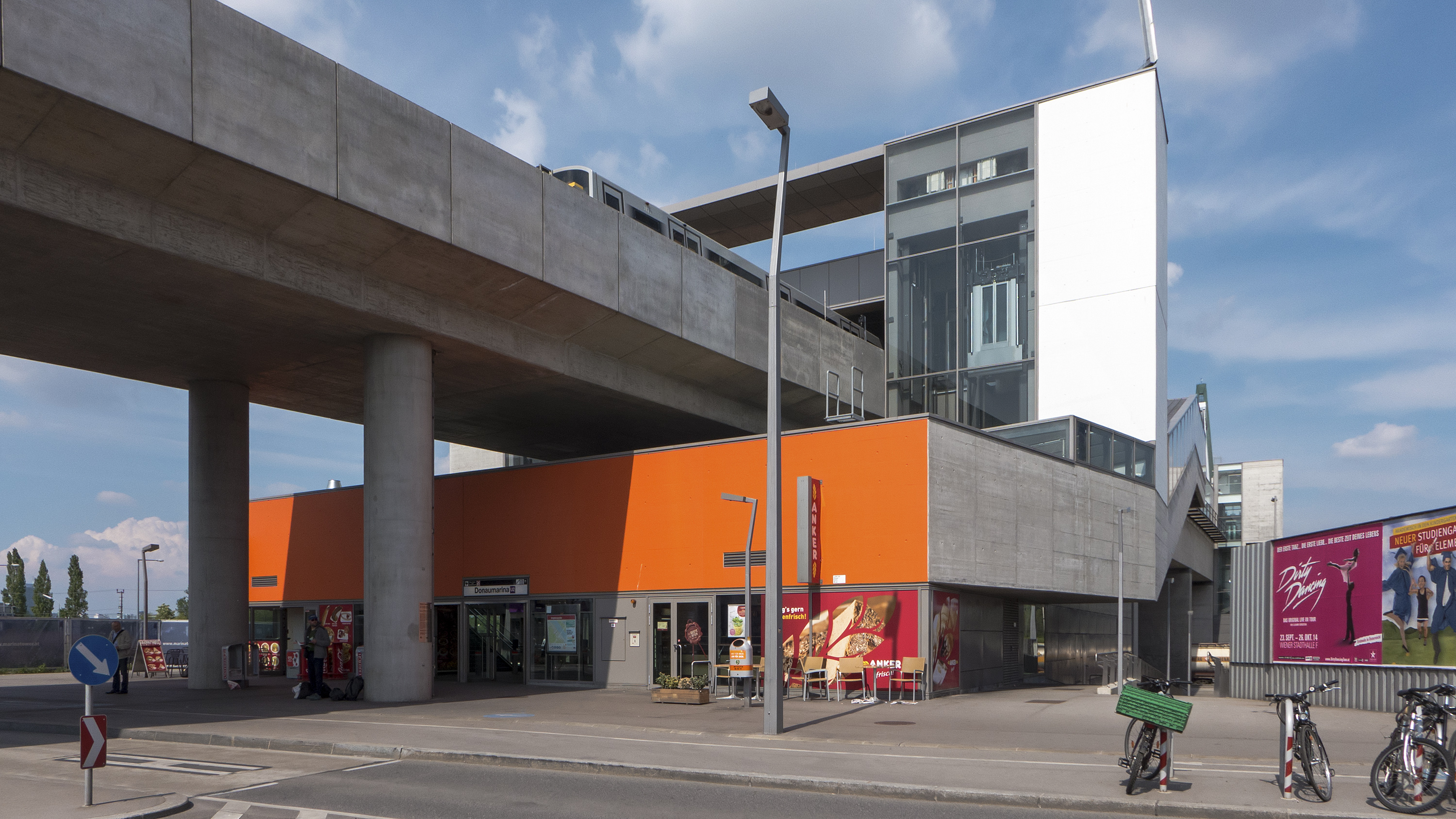
The station

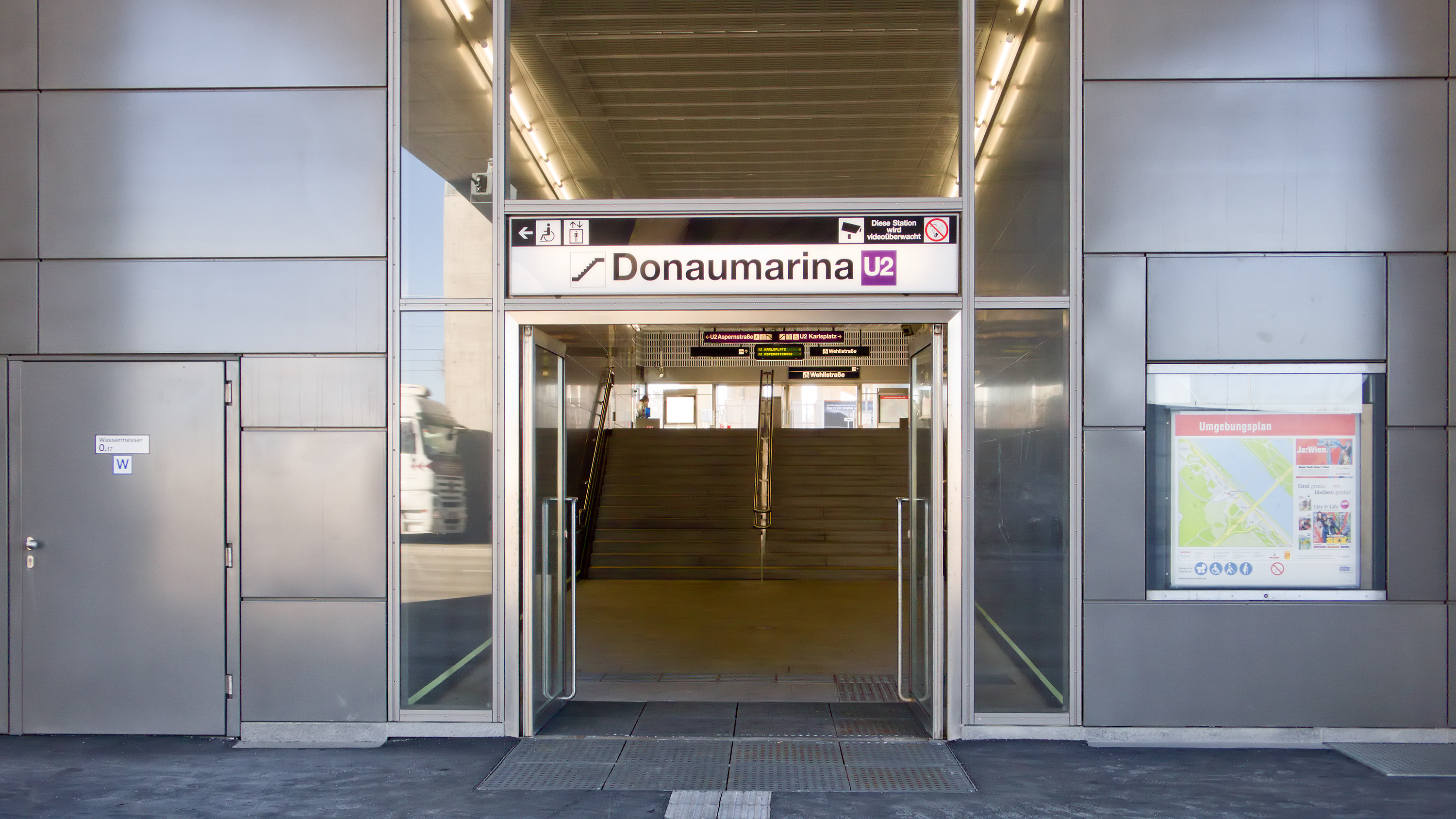
An entrance to the station

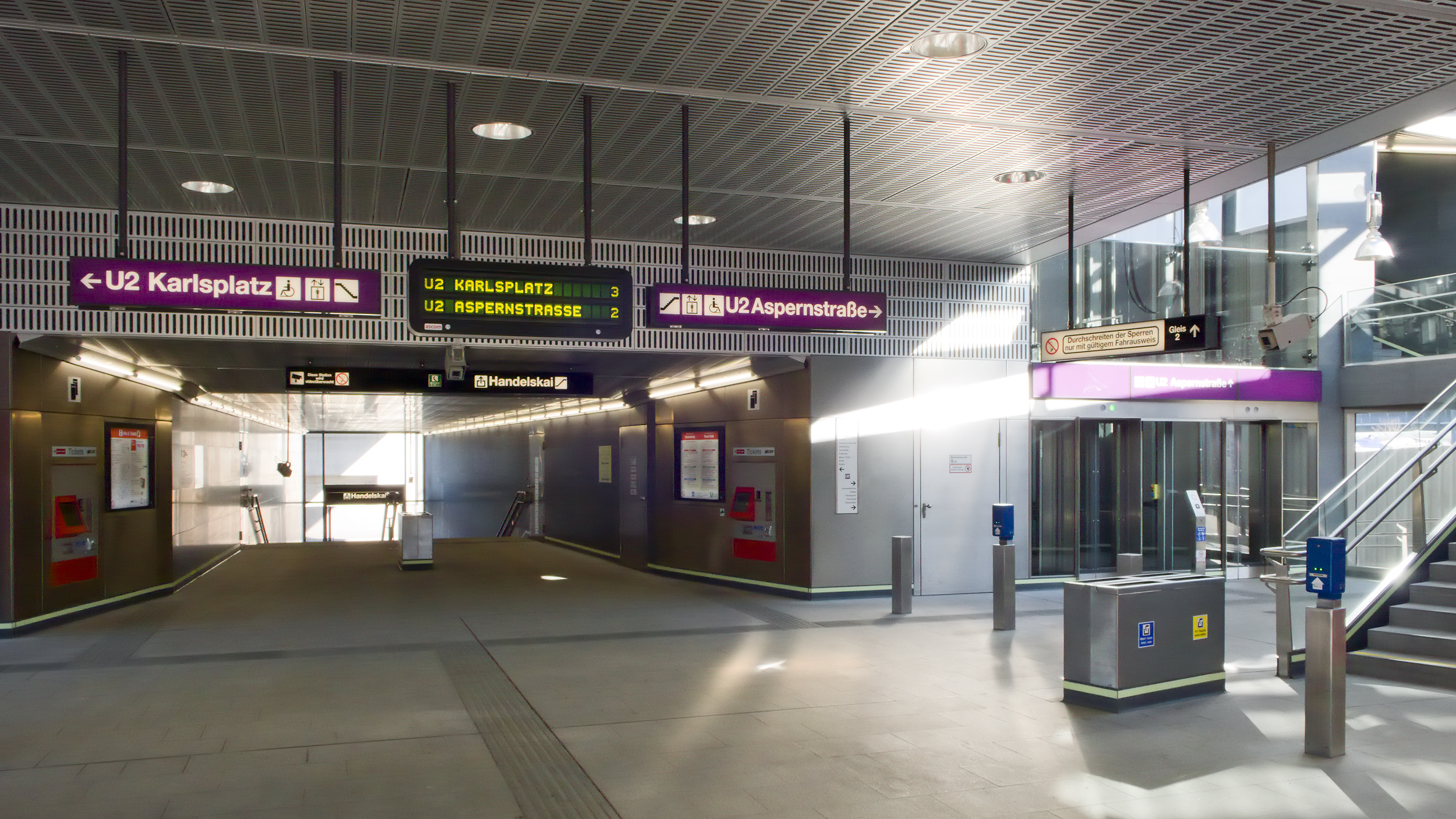
The interior

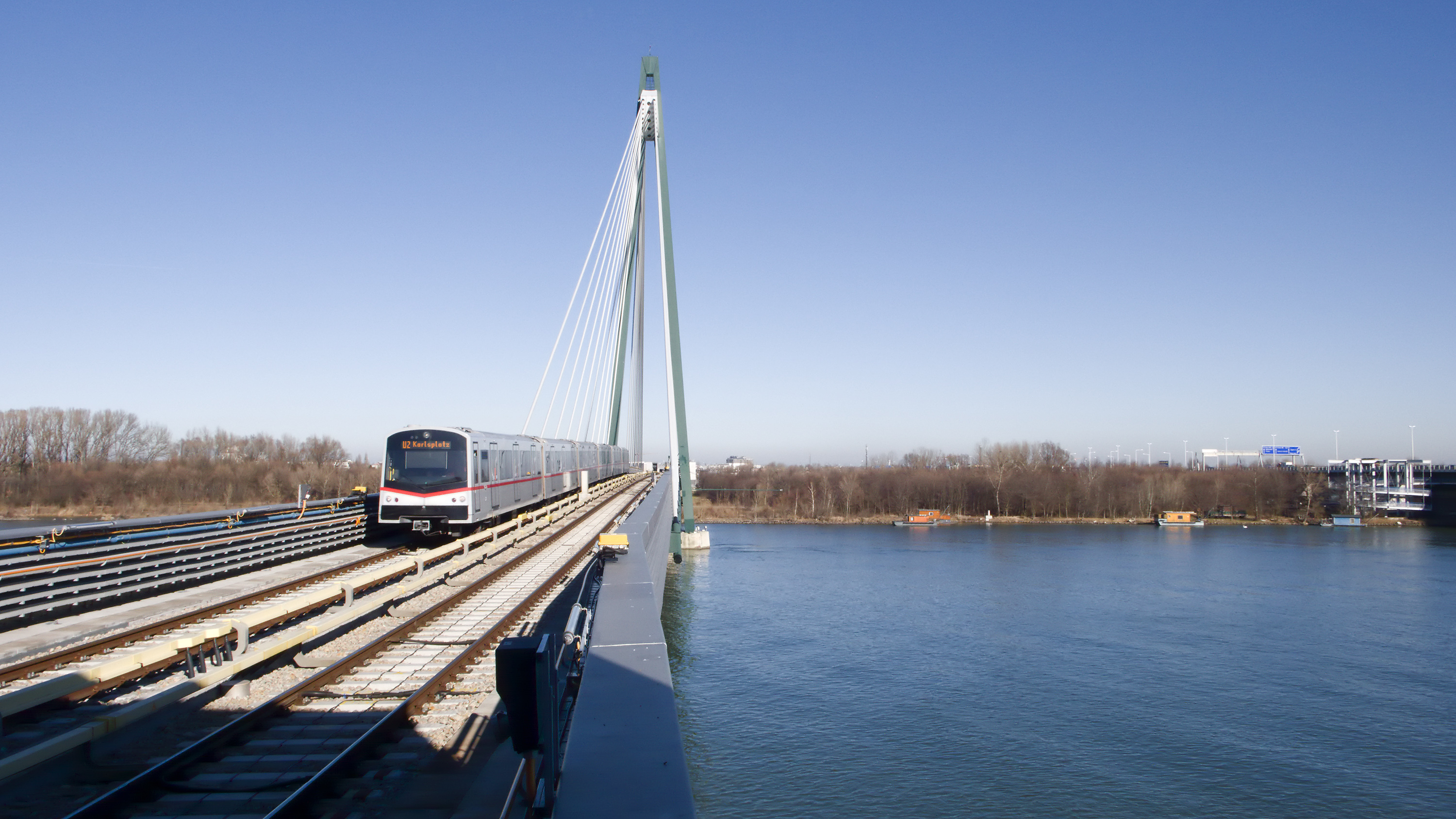
The U-Bahn crossing the Donaustadtbrücke

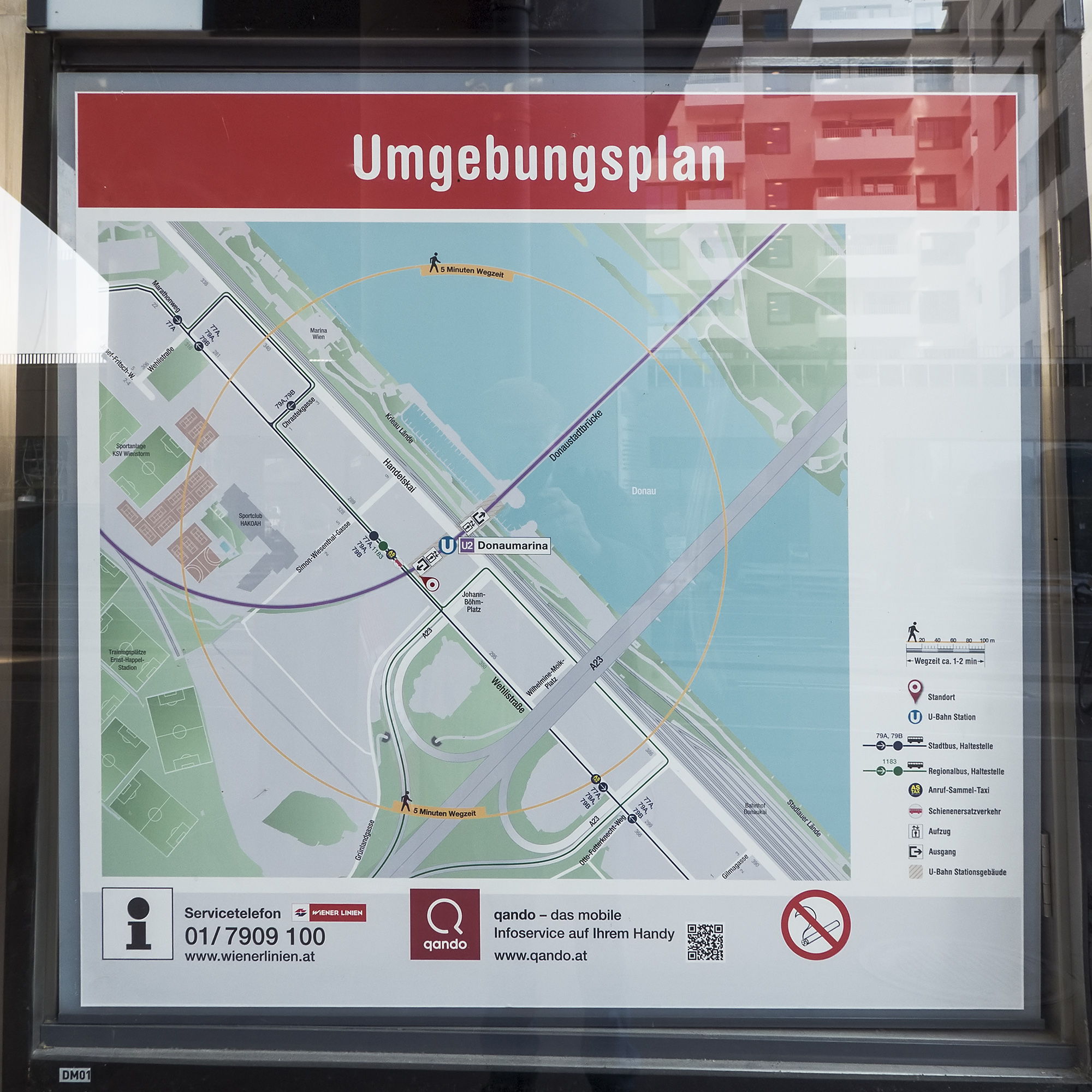
Map of the surrounding area
