= Stadion station =

Vienna U-Bahn station

Stadion
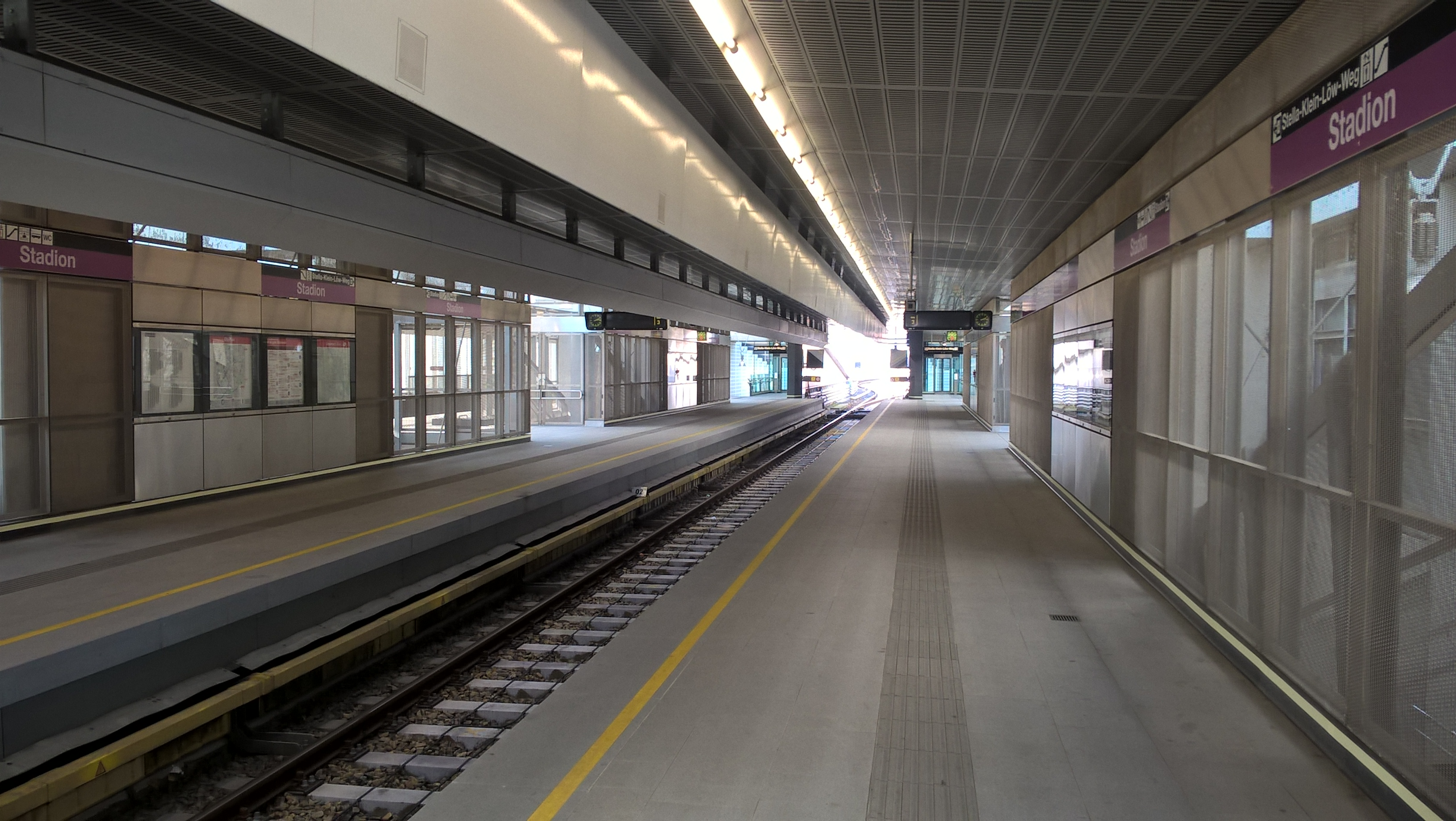

General information
- Location: Leopoldstadt, Vienna; Austria
- Coordinates: 48.2106°N 16.4204°E
- Bus routes: 11A, 77A

History
- Opened: 2008

Services
Preceding station	Wiener Linien	Following station
Krieau toward Karlsplatz	U2	Donaumarina toward Seestadt
Location

Stadion is a metro station on the U2 of the Vienna U-Bahn. It is located in Leopoldstadt, Vienna's 2nd district. The station opened in May 2008 as part of the eastern extension of the U2.

The station serves the Ernst-Happel-Stadion, the largest stadium in Austria and home of the Austria national football team, as well as the Stadion Center shopping mall.

== About ==
The station was opened on 10 May 2008 as part of the second phase of the U2 extension from Schottenring, becoming the line's terminus before the opening of Aspernstraße in 2010. It was inaugurated in time for the 2008 Euros, during which the Stadion hosted seven matches. During the tournament, a crowd control system - also intended for other major events - was used for the first time in Vienna. It ensured that only as many passengers were allowed onto the platforms as could be accommodated by the next arriving train.

It is designed as a three-track elevated station with two island platforms and exits at both ends. To better manage passenger flow during major events, each platform is equipped with four additional exits, which are opened as needed. The extra track allows for the easy deployment of supplementary trains, making boarding and alighting as smooth as possible for the thousands of visitors.

The station connects to the bus lines 11A and 77A, as well as international long-distance bus lines and the airport bus. It features multiple exits, including one leading to the Stadion Center and another to the Ernst-Happel-Stadion.

== Gallery ==
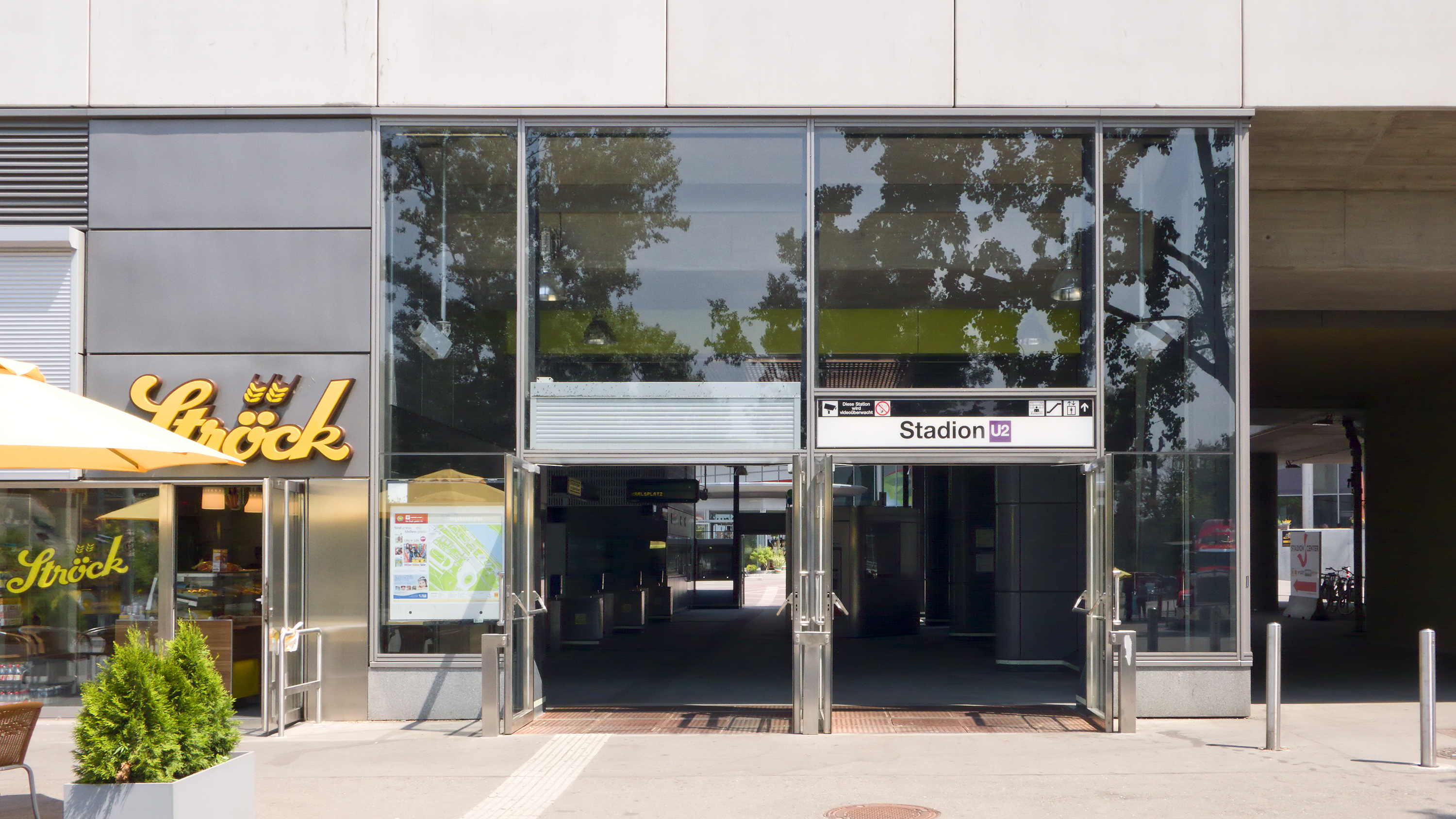
An entrance to the station

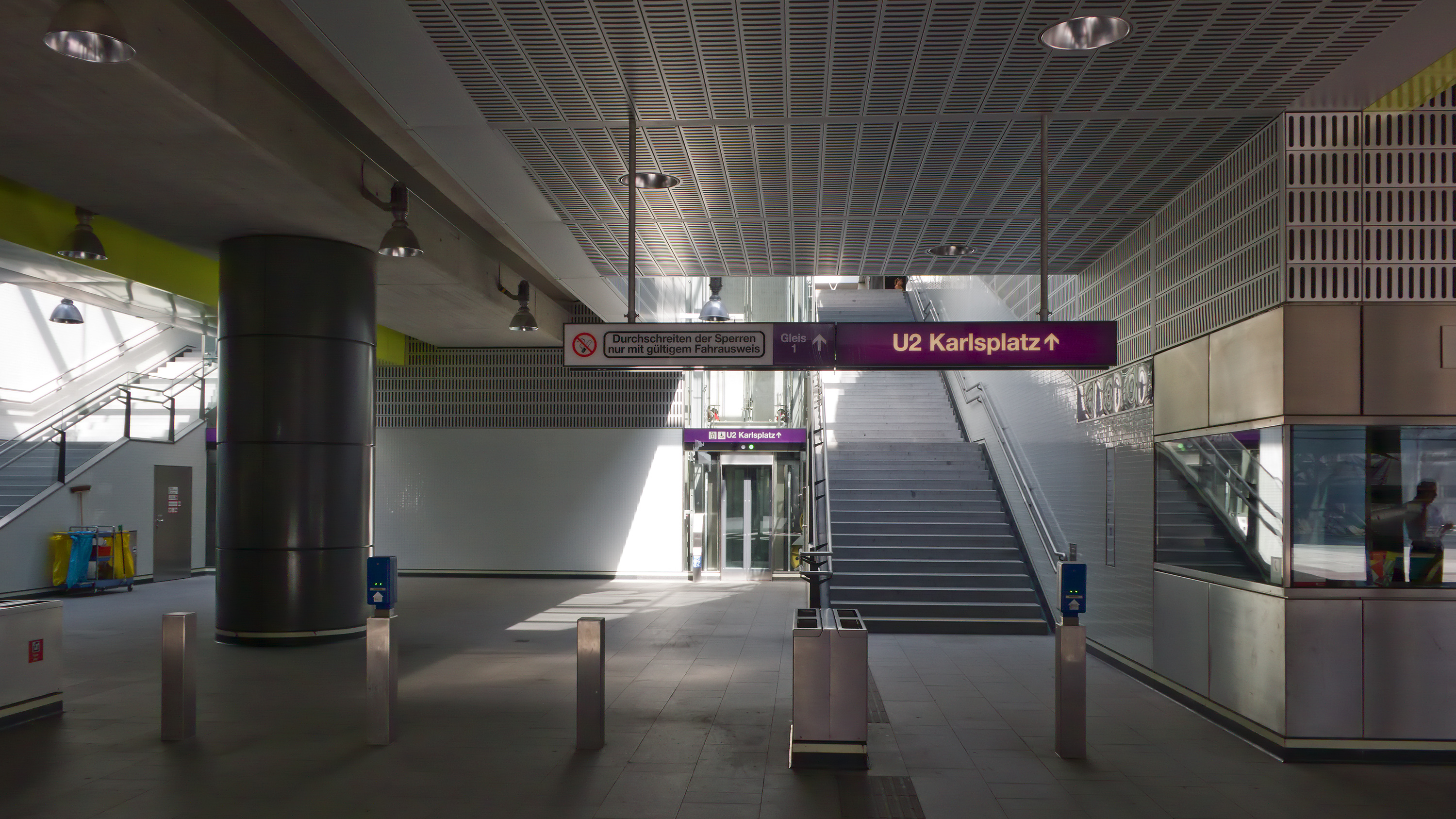
The Interior

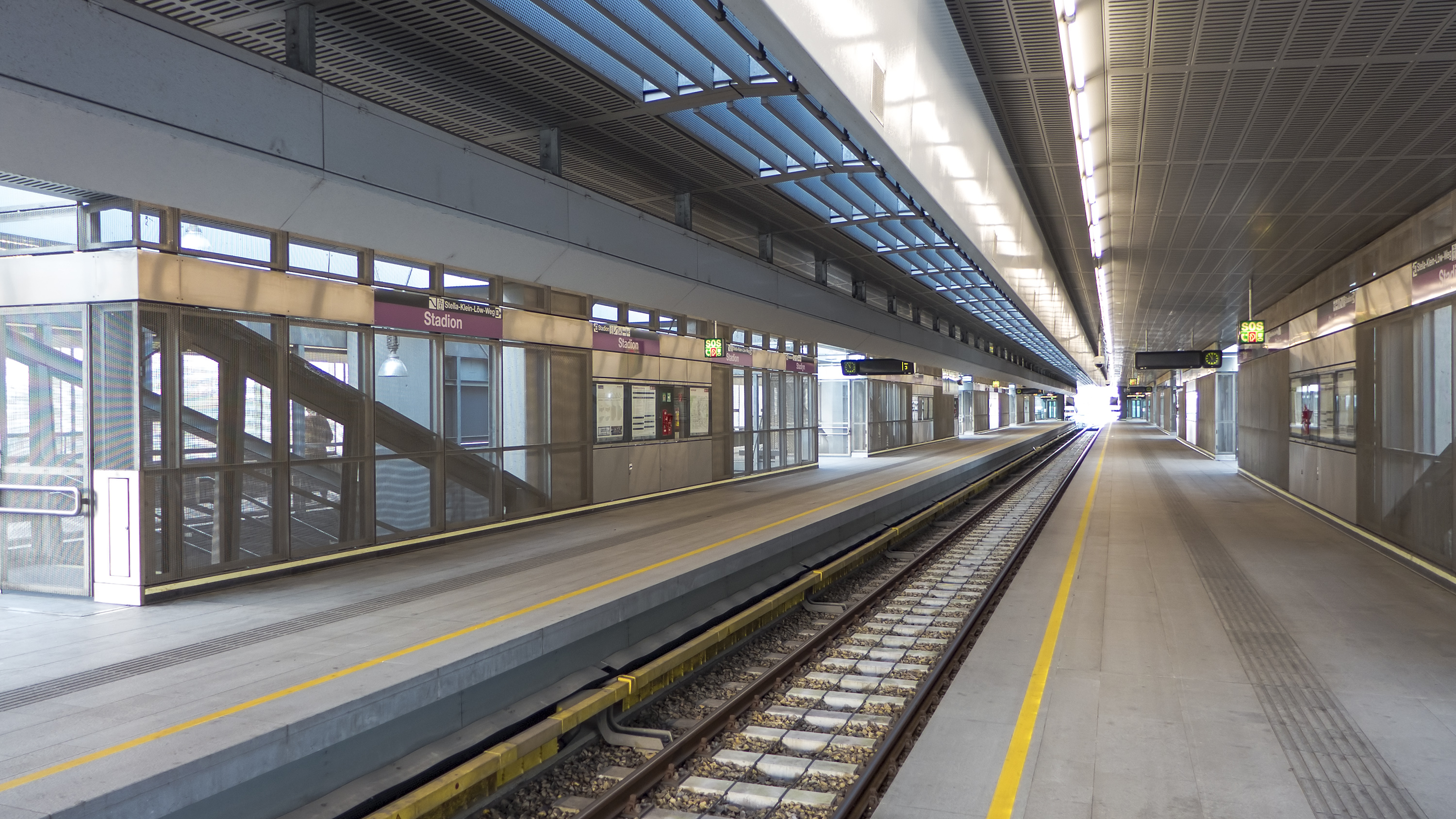
The platform

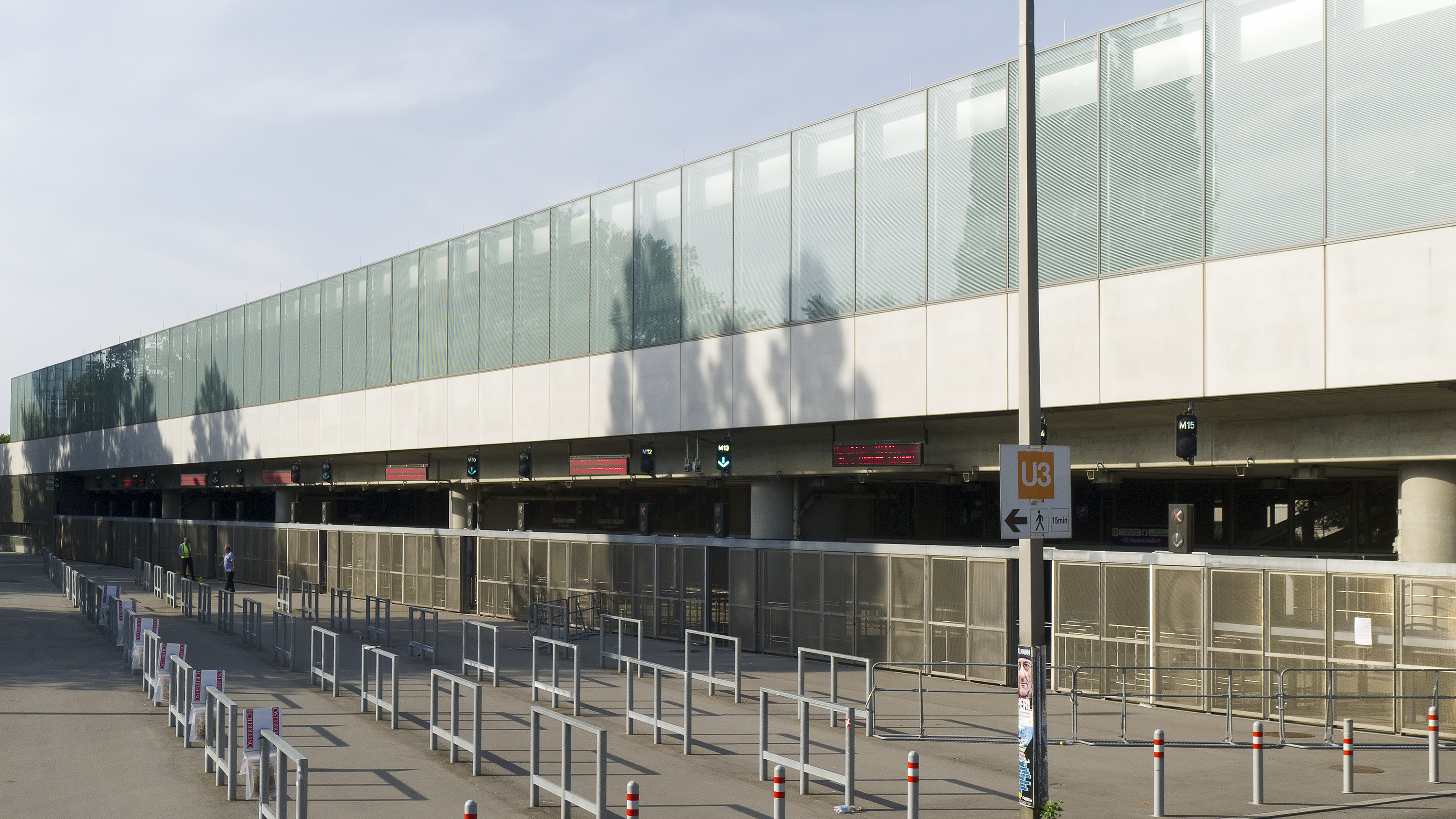
Open event entrances

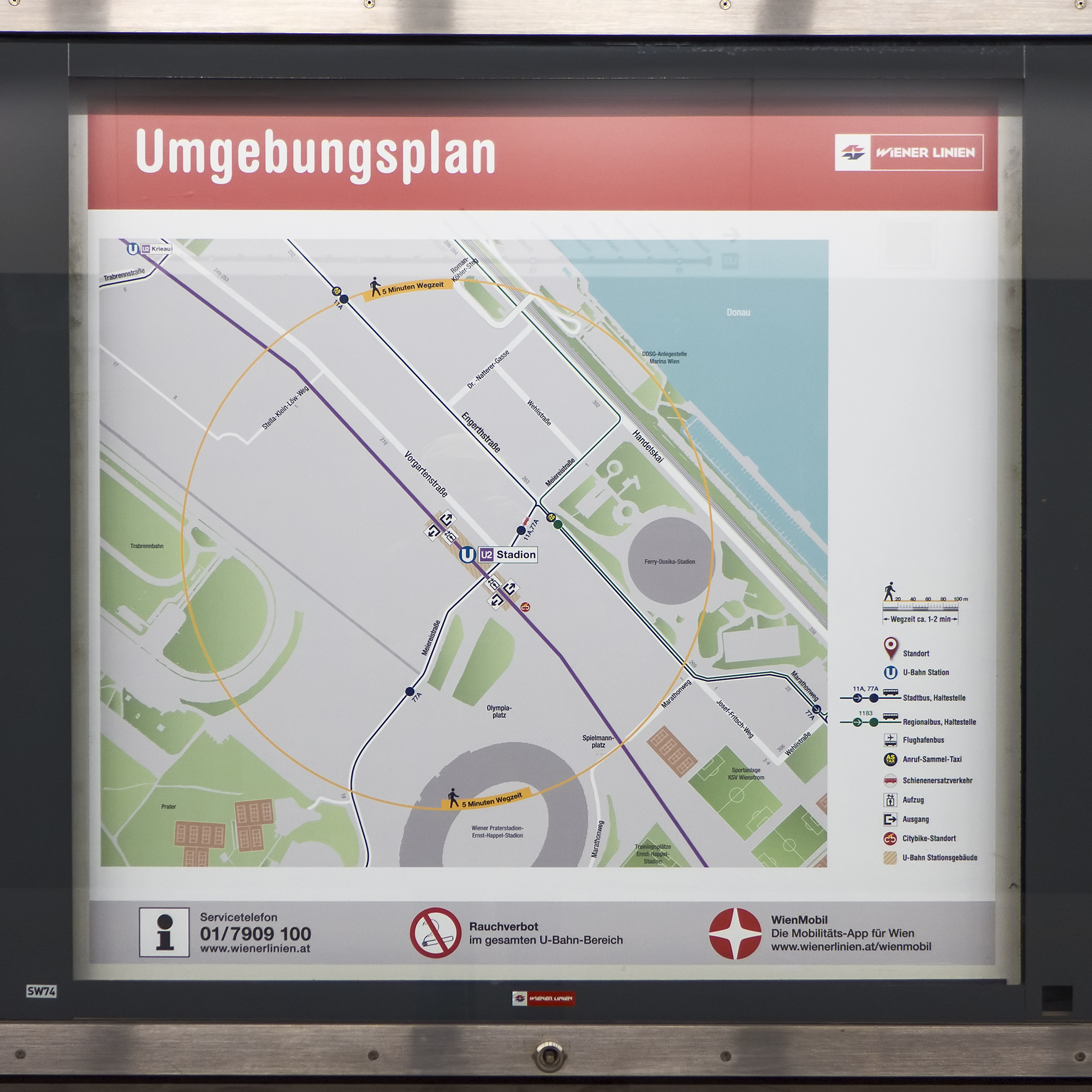
Map of the surrounding area
