= List of Vienna U-Bahn stations =

System map of Vienna U-Bahn network (2024)

There are 99 stations in the Vienna U-Bahn metro system in Vienna, Austria. The Vienna U-Bahn network consists of five lines operating on 78.5 kilometres (48.8 mi) of route.

== Legend ==
- Boldface: Terminus station

== List ==
Station	Photo	Lines	Opened	Character	Notes
Aderklaaer Straße	Aderklaaer Straße	U1 (Vienna U-Bahn)	2 September 2006	At-grade	
Alaudagasse	Alaudagasse	U1 (Vienna U-Bahn)	2 September 2017	Underground	
Alser Straße	Alser Straße	U6 (Vienna U-Bahn)	7 October 1989	Elevated	Historic Otto Wagner station retained
Alte Donau	Alte Donau	U1 (Vienna U-Bahn)	3 September 1982	Elevated	
Alterlaa	Alterlaa	U6 (Vienna U-Bahn)	15 April 1995	Elevated	
Altes Landgut	Altes Landgut	U1 (Vienna U-Bahn)	2 September 2017	Underground	
Am Schöpfwerk	Am Schöpfwerk	U6 (Vienna U-Bahn)	15 April 1995	Elevated	
Aspern Nord	Aspern Nord	U2 (Vienna U-Bahn)	5 October 2013	At-grade	
Aspernstraße	Aspernstraße	U2 (Vienna U-Bahn)	2 October 2010	Elevated	
Bahnhof Meidling	Bahnhof Meidling	U6 (Vienna U-Bahn)	7 October 1989	Underground	Transfers: Name changed from Philadelphiabrücke in 2013
Braunschweiggasse	Braunschweiggasse	U4 (Vienna U-Bahn)	20 December 1981	In trench	
Burggasse-Stadthalle	Burggasse-Stadthalle	U6 (Vienna U-Bahn)	7 October 1989	In trench	Otto Wagner’s design partially retained; Platforms in open-cut trench
Donauinsel	Donauinsel	U1 (Vienna U-Bahn)	3 September 1982	Elevated	Station is on lower level of Reichsbrücke
Donaumarina	Donaumarina	U2 (Vienna U-Bahn)	2 October 2010	Elevated	
Donauspital	Donauspital	U2 (Vienna U-Bahn)	2 October 2010	Elevated	
Donaustadtbrücke	Donaustadtbrücke	U2 (Vienna U-Bahn)	2 October 2010	Elevated	
Dresdner Straße	Dresdner Straße	U6 (Vienna U-Bahn)	4 May 1996	Underground	
Enkplatz	Enkplatz	U3 (Vienna U-Bahn)	2 December 2000	Underground	
Erdberg	Erdberg	U3 (Vienna U-Bahn)	6 April 1991	At-grade	Central control and maintenance facility; track branch to U2
Erlaaer Straße	Erlaaer Straße	U6 (Vienna U-Bahn)	15 April 1995	Elevated	
**Floridsdorf**	Floridsdorf	U6 (Vienna U-Bahn)	4 May 1996	Underground	Transfers: First station on this site dated to 1897; current station is a rebuilding of an S-Bahn terminus
Friedensbrücke	Friedensbrücke	U4 (Vienna U-Bahn)	8 May 1976	At-grade	Otto Wagner's station design is partially retained; From 1978 until 1991, station was terminus of the Stadtbahn and later the U6 line
Gasometer	Gasometer	U3 (Vienna U-Bahn)	2 December 2000	Underground	
Großfeldsiedlung	Großfeldsiedlung	U1 (Vienna U-Bahn)	2 September 2006	Underground	
Gumpendorfer Straße	Gumpendorfer Straße	U6 (Vienna U-Bahn)	7 October 1989	Elevated	Historic 1898 Otto Wagner station retained
Handelskai	Handelskai	U6 (Vienna U-Bahn)	4 May 1996	Elevated	Transfers:
Hardeggasse	Hardeggasse	U2 (Vienna U-Bahn)	2 October 2010	Elevated	
Hausfeldstraße	Hausfeldstraße	U2 (Vienna U-Bahn)	5 October 2013	Elevated	
**Heiligenstadt**	Heiligenstadt	U4 (Vienna U-Bahn)	8 May 1976	At-grade	Transfers: Until 1989 terminus of Stadtbahn line G; Otto Wagner's station design is partially retained; Until 1996 terminus of U6
Herrengasse	Herrengasse	U3 (Vienna U-Bahn)	6 April 1991	Underground	Remains of ancient city walls
Hietzing	Hietzing	U4 (Vienna U-Bahn)	31 August 1981	In trench	Otto Wagner's 1899 Hofpavillon Stadtbahn station, for the use of the Imperial family, is at one end of the inward-bound platform
**Hütteldorf**	Hütteldorf	U4 (Vienna U-Bahn)	20 December 1981	At-grade	Transfers: Was the Hütteldorf-Hacking station on the Stadtbahn (opened 1898); Otto Wagner's station design is partially retained
Hütteldorfer Straße	Hütteldorfer Straße	U3 (Vienna U-Bahn)	5 December 1998	Underground	
Jägerstraße	Jägerstraße	U6 (Vienna U-Bahn)	4 May 1996	Underground	
Johnstraße	Johnstraße	U3 (Vienna U-Bahn)	3 September 1994	Underground	
Josefstädter Straße	Josefstädter Straße	U6 (Vienna U-Bahn)	7 October 1989	Elevated	Historic 1898 Otto Wagner station retained
Kagran	Kagran	U1 (Vienna U-Bahn)	3 September 1982	Elevated	Name changed from Zentrum Kagran ("Kagran Centre") to avoid confusion
Kagraner Platz	Kagraner Platz	U1 (Vienna U-Bahn)	2 September 2006	Underground	
Kaisermühlen-VIC	Kaisermühlen-VIC	U1 (Vienna U-Bahn)	3 September 1982	Elevated	
Kardinal-Nagl-Platz	Kardinal-Nagl-Platz	U3 (Vienna U-Bahn)	6 April 1991	Underground	
**Karlsplatz**	Karlsplatz	U1 (Vienna U-Bahn) U2 (Vienna U-Bahn) U4 (Vienna U-Bahn)	25 February 1978	Underground	Transfers: U4 station on the site of 1898 Stadtbahn station and incorporating parts of it; U2 portion of station opened 30 August 1980; Complex design because River Wien flows underground between the U2 and U4 platforms; has more escalators than any other station in system
Kendlerstraße	Kendlerstraße	U3 (Vienna U-Bahn)	5 December 1998	Underground	
Keplerplatz	Keplerplatz	U1 (Vienna U-Bahn)	25 February 1978	Underground	
Kettenbrückengasse	Kettenbrückengasse	U4 (Vienna U-Bahn)	26 October 1980	In trench	Otto Wagner's station design is partially retained
Krieau	Krieau	U2 (Vienna U-Bahn)	10 May 2008	Elevated	Until 2006, station was to be named Trabrennstraße
Längenfeldgasse	Längenfeldgasse	U4 (Vienna U-Bahn) U6 (Vienna U-Bahn)	7 October 1989	Underground	Station was originally not part of the U4 line, and didn't open until U6 line opened
Landstraße	Landstraße	U3 (Vienna U-Bahn) U4 (Vienna U-Bahn)	15 August 1978	Underground	Transfers (via Wien Mitte railway station): CAT: U4 station was an 1899 Stadtbahn station; U3 portion of station opened 6 April 1991
**Leopoldau**	Leopoldau	U1 (Vienna U-Bahn)	2 September 2006	Underground	Transfers:
Lina-Loos-Platz	Lina-Loos-Platz	U2 (Vienna U-Bahn)	19 January 2026	Elevated	Previously named An den Alten Schanzen and Oberes Hausfeld
Margaretengürtel	Margaretengürtel	U4 (Vienna U-Bahn)	26 October 1980	In trench	Otto Wagner's station design is partially retained
Meidling Hauptstraße	Meidling Hauptstraße	U4 (Vienna U-Bahn)	26 October 1980	Underground	Extra-wide platform used to accommodate a third track for terminus of Stadtbahn lines G/GD from 1980 to 1985
Messe-Prater	Messe-Prater	U2 (Vienna U-Bahn)	10 May 2008	Underground	
Michelbeuern-AKH	Michelbeuern-AKH	U6 (Vienna U-Bahn)	7 October 1989	At-grade	Location of railyard since 1898
Museumsquartier	Museumsquartier	U2 (Vienna U-Bahn)	30 August 1980	Underground	Station features public art; Opened in 1965 as Mariahilfer Straße on the U-Straßenbahn underground tramway
Nestroyplatz	Nestroyplatz	U1 (Vienna U-Bahn)	24 November 1979	Underground	
Neubaugasse	Neubaugasse	U3 (Vienna U-Bahn)	4 September 1993	Underground stacked platforms	U2 station under construction, opening planned for 2028
Neue Donau	Neue Donau	U6 (Vienna U-Bahn)	4 May 1996	Elevated	
Neulaa	Neulaa	U1 (Vienna U-Bahn)	2 September 2017	At-grade	
Niederhofstraße	Niederhofstraße	U6 (Vienna U-Bahn)	7 October 1989	Underground	
Nußdorfer Straße	Nußdorfer Straße	U6 (Vienna U-Bahn)	7 October 1989	Elevated	Historic Otto Wagner station retained
**Oberlaa**	Oberlaa	U1 (Vienna U-Bahn)	2 September 2017	At-grade	
Ober St. Veit	Ober St. Veit	U4 (Vienna U-Bahn)	20 December 1981	In trench	Otto Wagner's station design is partially retained
**Ottakring**	Ottakring	U3 (Vienna U-Bahn)	5 December 1998	Elevated	Transfers:
Perfektastraße	Perfektastraße	U6 (Vienna U-Bahn)	15 April 1995	Elevated	
Pilgramgasse	Pilgramgasse	U4 (Vienna U-Bahn)	26 October 1980	In trench	Otto Wagner's station design is partially retained; U2 station in tunnel under construction, opening planned for 2028
Praterstern	Praterstern	U1 (Vienna U-Bahn) U2 (Vienna U-Bahn)	28 February 1981	Underground	Transfers: Originally built with branch-off of Line U1A planned; U2 line was built instead
Rathaus	Rathaus	U2 (Vienna U-Bahn)	30 August 1980	Underground	Station opened in 1965 as Friedrich-Schmidt-Platz on the U-Straßenbahn underground tramway; New U2 station under construction, opening planned for 2028. Present station serviced by U5 from 2026 on.
Rennbahnweg	Rennbahnweg	U1 (Vienna U-Bahn)	2 September 2006	Elevated	
Reumannplatz	Reumannplatz	U1 (Vienna U-Bahn)	25 February 1978	Underground	
Rochusgasse	Rochusgasse	U3 (Vienna U-Bahn)	6 April 1991	Underground	
Roßauer Lände	Roßauer Lände	U4 (Vienna U-Bahn)	3 April 1978	In trench	Otto Wagner's station design is partially retained
Schlachthausgasse	Schlachthausgasse	U3 (Vienna U-Bahn)	6 April 1991	Underground	
Schottenring	Schottenring	U2 (Vienna U-Bahn) U4 (Vienna U-Bahn)	3 April 1978	Underground	The part of station that connects to U4 was converted from 1901 Stadtbahn station; Station is located under the Donaukanal; Current iteration of U2 station opened 10 May 2008; it was the 1980 terminus for U2, but with different platform layout
Schottentor	Schottentor	U2 (Vienna U-Bahn)	30 August 1980	Underground	
Schwedenplatz	Schwedenplatz	U1 (Vienna U-Bahn) U4 (Vienna U-Bahn)	15 August 1978	Underground	Formerly Stadtbahn station (1901); Remnants of the ancient city walls visible
Schweglerstraße	Schweglerstraße	U3 (Vienna U-Bahn)	3 September 1994	Underground	Station features public art
Schönbrunn	Schönbrunn	U4 (Vienna U-Bahn)	31 August 1981	In trench	Otto Wagner's station design is largely retained
**Seestadt**	Seestadt	U2 (Vienna U-Bahn)	5 October 2013	Elevated	
**Siebenhirten**	Siebenhirten	U6 (Vienna U-Bahn)	15 April 1995	Elevated	
**Simmering**	Simmering	U3 (Vienna U-Bahn)	2 December 2000	Underground	Transfers:
Spittelau	Spittelau	U4 (Vienna U-Bahn) U6 (Vienna U-Bahn)	7 October 1995	At-grade (U4); Elevated (U6)	Transfers: Station is a recent creation and had no previous Stadtbahn or U-Bahn service
Stadion	Stadion	U2 (Vienna U-Bahn)	10 May 2008	Elevated	3 tracks, 2 symmetrical inside platforms
Stadlau	Stadlau	U2 (Vienna U-Bahn)	2 October 2010	Elevated	Transfers:
Stadtpark	Stadtpark	U4 (Vienna U-Bahn)	15 August 1978	In trench	Landmark building by Otto Wagner, opened 30 July 1899, is retained as part of the station; Station is in open cut within the park
Stephansplatz	Stephansplatz	U1 (Vienna U-Bahn) U3 (Vienna U-Bahn)	18 November 1978	Underground stacked platforms (U3)	Vergilius Chapel is within the station; U3 portion of the station opened 6 April 1991
Stubentor	Stubentor	U3 (Vienna U-Bahn)	6 April 1991	Underground stacked platforms	Remains of ancient city walls
Südtiroler Platz-Hauptbahnhof	Südtiroler Platz-Hauptbahnhof	U1 (Vienna U-Bahn)	25 February 1978	Underground	Transfers:
Taborstraße	Taborstraße	U2 (Vienna U-Bahn)	10 May 2008	Underground	
Taubstummengasse	Taubstummengasse	U1 (Vienna U-Bahn)	25 February 1978	Underground	
Thaliastraße	Thaliastraße	U6 (Vienna U-Bahn)	7 October 1989	Elevated	First opened in 1980 as a Stadtbahn station
Troststraße	Troststraße	U1 (Vienna U-Bahn)	2 September 2017	Underground	
Tscherttegasse	Tscherttegasse	U6 (Vienna U-Bahn)	15 April 1995	At-grade	
Unter St. Veit	Unter St. Veit	U4 (Vienna U-Bahn)	20 December 1981	In trench	
Volkstheater	Volkstheater	U2 (Vienna U-Bahn) U3 (Vienna U-Bahn)	30 August 1980	Underground	Station opened in 1965 as Burggasse on the U-Straßenbahn underground tramway; U3 portion of station opened 6 April 1991; Station features public art
Vorgartenstraße	Vorgartenstraße	U1 (Vienna U-Bahn)	3 September 1982	Underground	Connection to Donaudampfschiffahrtsgesellschaft
Währinger Straße-Volksoper	Währinger Straße-Volksoper	U6 (Vienna U-Bahn)	7 October 1989	Elevated	Historic Otto Wagner station retained
Westbahnhof	Westbahnhof	U3 (Vienna U-Bahn) U6 (Vienna U-Bahn)	7 October 1989	Underground	Transfers: U6 station, opened 1989, was an 1898 Stadtbahn station; U3 station portion opened 4 September 1994; Public art in parts of passageways
Zieglergasse	Zieglergasse	U3 (Vienna U-Bahn)	4 September 1993	Underground stacked platforms	
Zippererstraße	Zippererstraße	U3 (Vienna U-Bahn)	2 December 2000	Underground	

=== Future stations ===
Station	Photo	Lines	Opened	Character	Notes
Frankhplatz		U5 (Vienna U-Bahn)		Underground	Station under construction, opening planned for 2026
Matzleinsdorfer Platz		U2 (Vienna U-Bahn)		Underground	Transfers: Station under construction, opening planned for 2028
Reinprechtsdorfer Straße		U2 (Vienna U-Bahn)		Underground	Station under construction, opening planned for 2028

=== Closed stations ===
Station	Photo	Lines	Opened	Character	Notes
Lerchenfelder Straße		U2 (Vienna U-Bahn)	30 August 1980	Underground	Station opened in 1965 on the U-Straßenbahn underground tramway; Closed in 2003 due to low distance to neighbouring stations
