= Am Schöpfwerk station =

Vienna U-Bahn station

Am Schöpfwerk
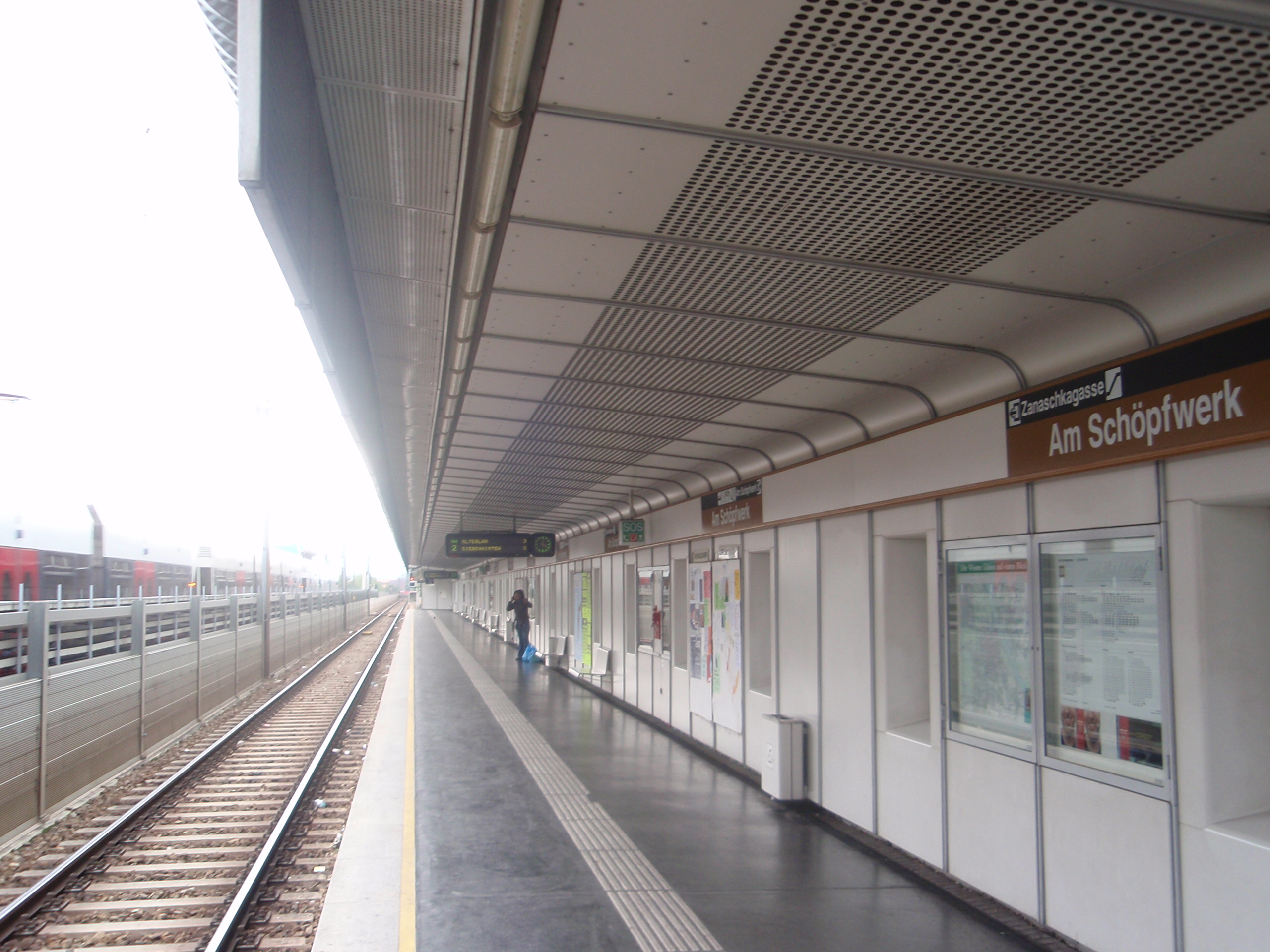

General information
- Location: Meidling, Vienna; Austria
- Coordinates: 48.1607°N 16.3242°E
- System: Vienna U-Bahn rapid transit station

History
- Opened: 15 April 1995

Services
Preceding station	Wiener Linien	Following station
Tscherttegasse toward Floridsdorf	U6	Alterlaa toward Siebenhirten
Location

Am Schöpfwerk is a station on U6 of the Vienna U-Bahn. It is located in the Meidling District. It opened on 15 April 1995 as part of the section between Philadelphiabrücke and Siebenhirten.
