= Alterlaa station =

Vienna U-Bahn station

Alterlaa
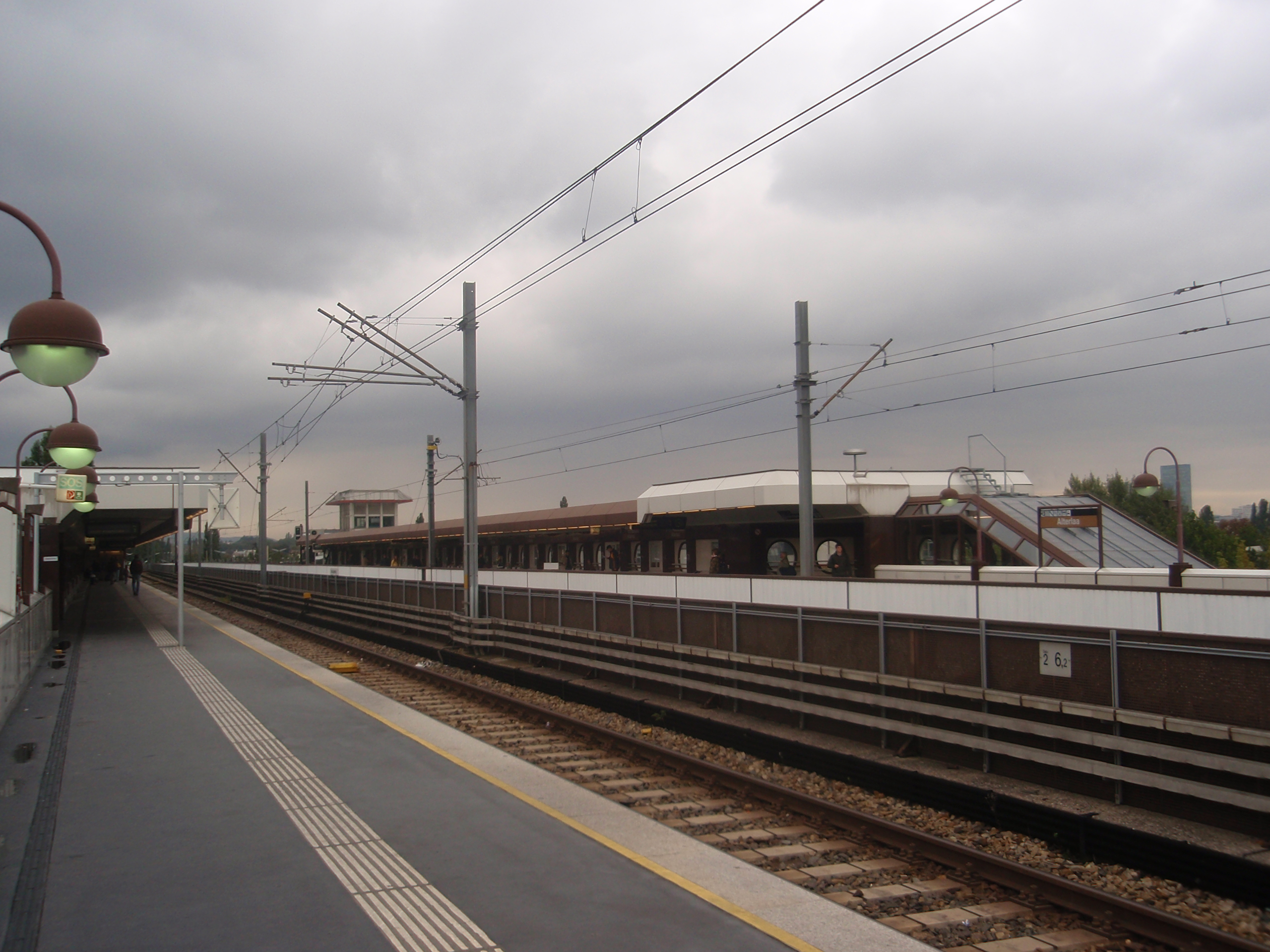

General information
- Location: Liesing, Vienna; Austria
- Coordinates: 48.1505°N 16.3169°E
- System: Vienna U-Bahn rapid transit station

History
- Opened: 15 April 1995

Services
Preceding station	Wiener Linien	Following station
Am Schöpfwerk toward Floridsdorf	U6	Erlaaer Straße toward Siebenhirten
Location

Alterlaa is a station on U6 of the Vienna U-Bahn. It is located in the Liesing District. It opened on 15 April 1995 as part of the section between Bahnhof Meidling (formerly Philadelphiabrücke) and Siebenhirten. It lies near the Alterlaa housing development, constructed from 1975 to 1986.
