= Erlaaer Straße station =

Vienna U-Bahn station

Erlaaer Straße
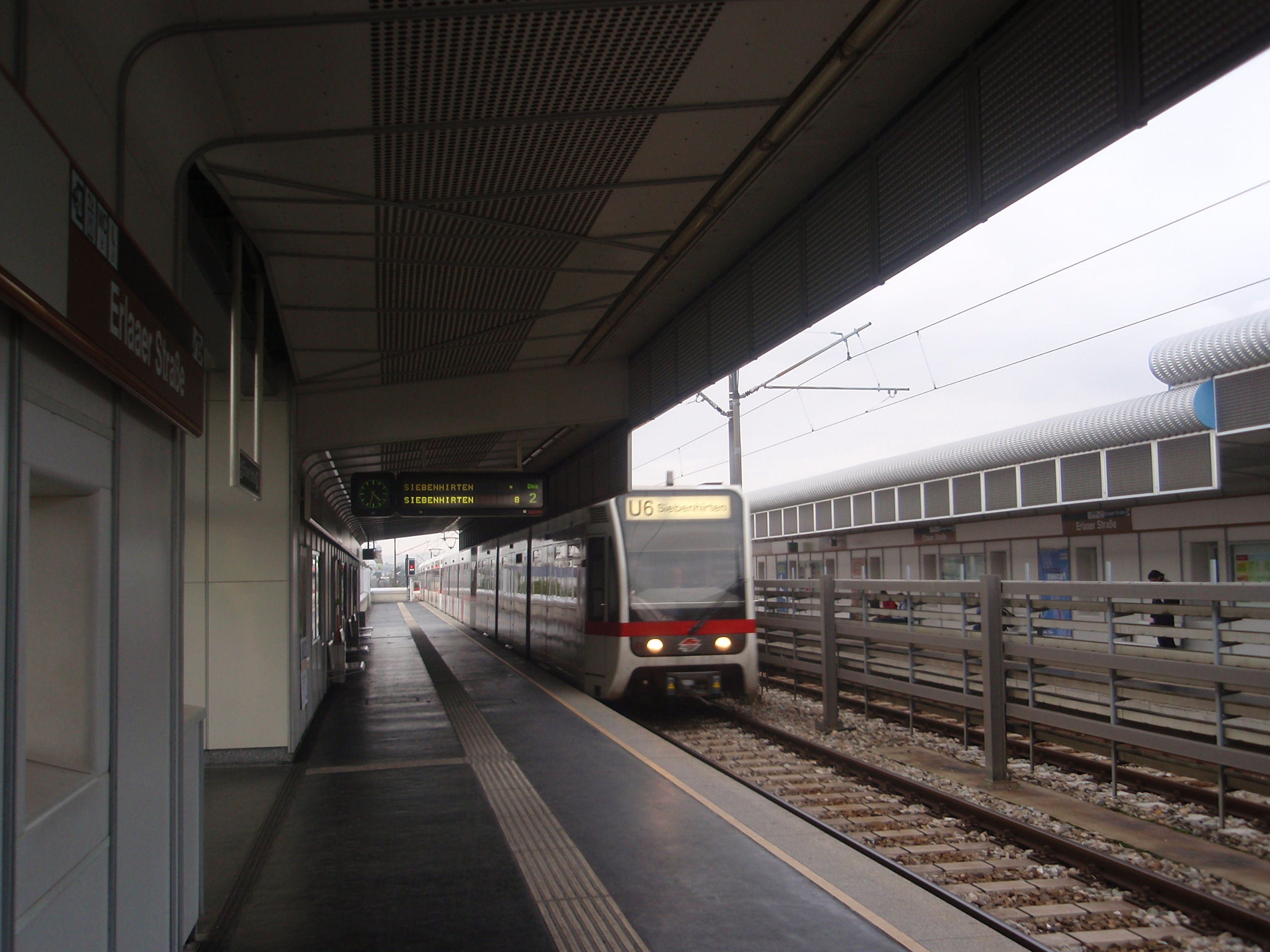

General information
- Location: Liesing, Vienna; Austria
- Coordinates: 48.1421°N 16.3165°E
- System: Vienna U-Bahn rapid transit station

History
- Opened: 15 April 1995

Services
Preceding station	Wiener Linien	Following station
Alterlaa toward Floridsdorf	U6	Perfektastraße toward Siebenhirten
Location

Erlaaer Straße is a station on U6 of the Vienna U-Bahn. It is located in the Liesing District. It opened on 15 April 1995 as part of the section between Philadelphiabrücke and Siebenhirten.

In the architecture of all new stations of the U6 south branch, a new forming technology of aluminum trapezoidal sheeting was used, which allowed the construction of differently shaped arches. Particularly striking are the elevator towers rounded at the top, designed by Johann Georg Gsteu.
