= Spittelau station =

Vienna U-Bahn station

Spittelau
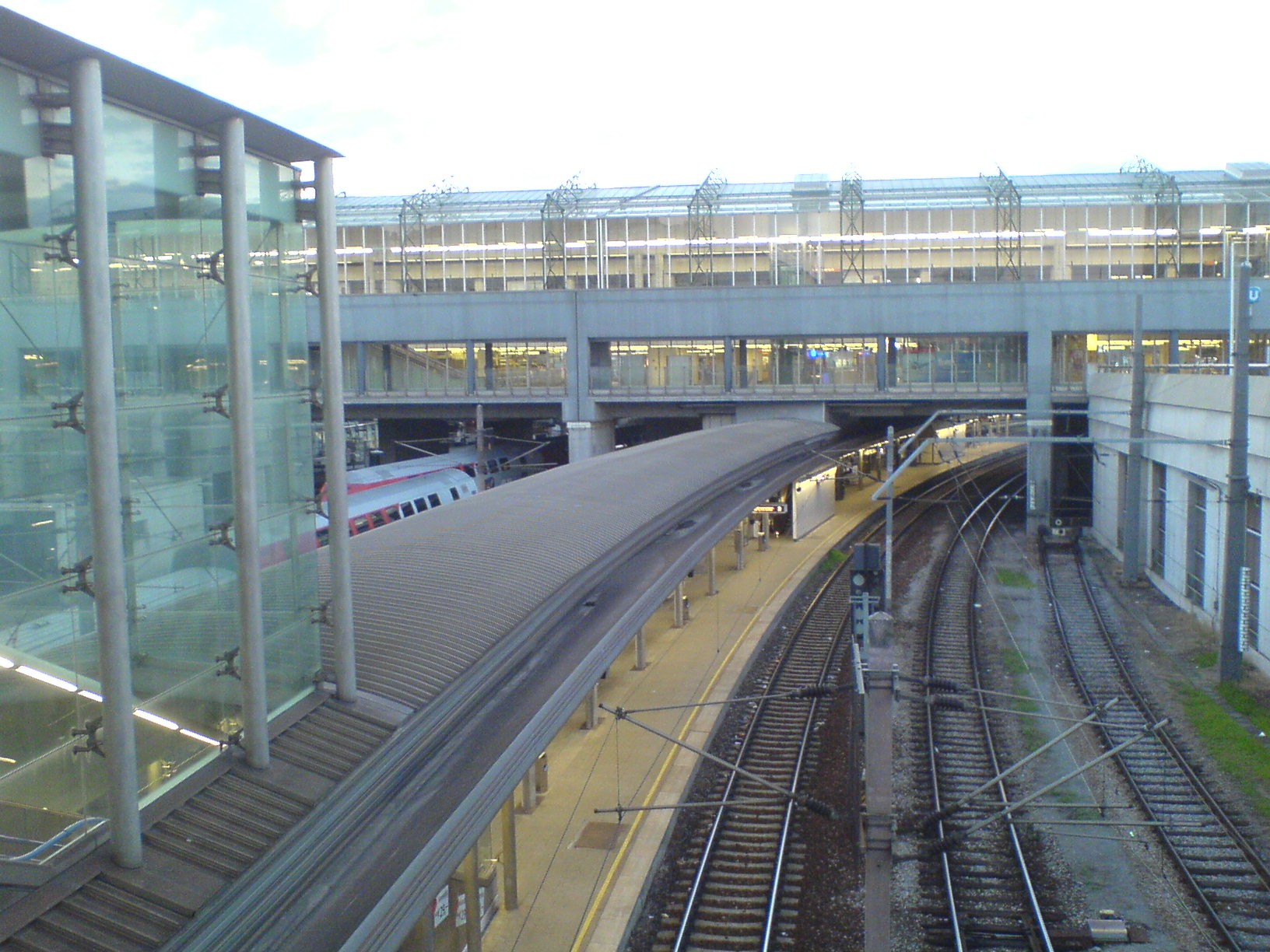

General information
- Location: Alsergrund, Vienna; Austria
- Coordinates: 48.2356°N 16.3580°E
- Lines: (Interchange); P+R

History
- Opened: 1995

Services
Preceding station	Wiener Linien	Following station
Friedensbrücke toward Hütteldorf	U4	Heiligenstadt Terminus
Jägerstraße toward Floridsdorf	U6	Nußdorfer Straße toward Siebenhirten
Location

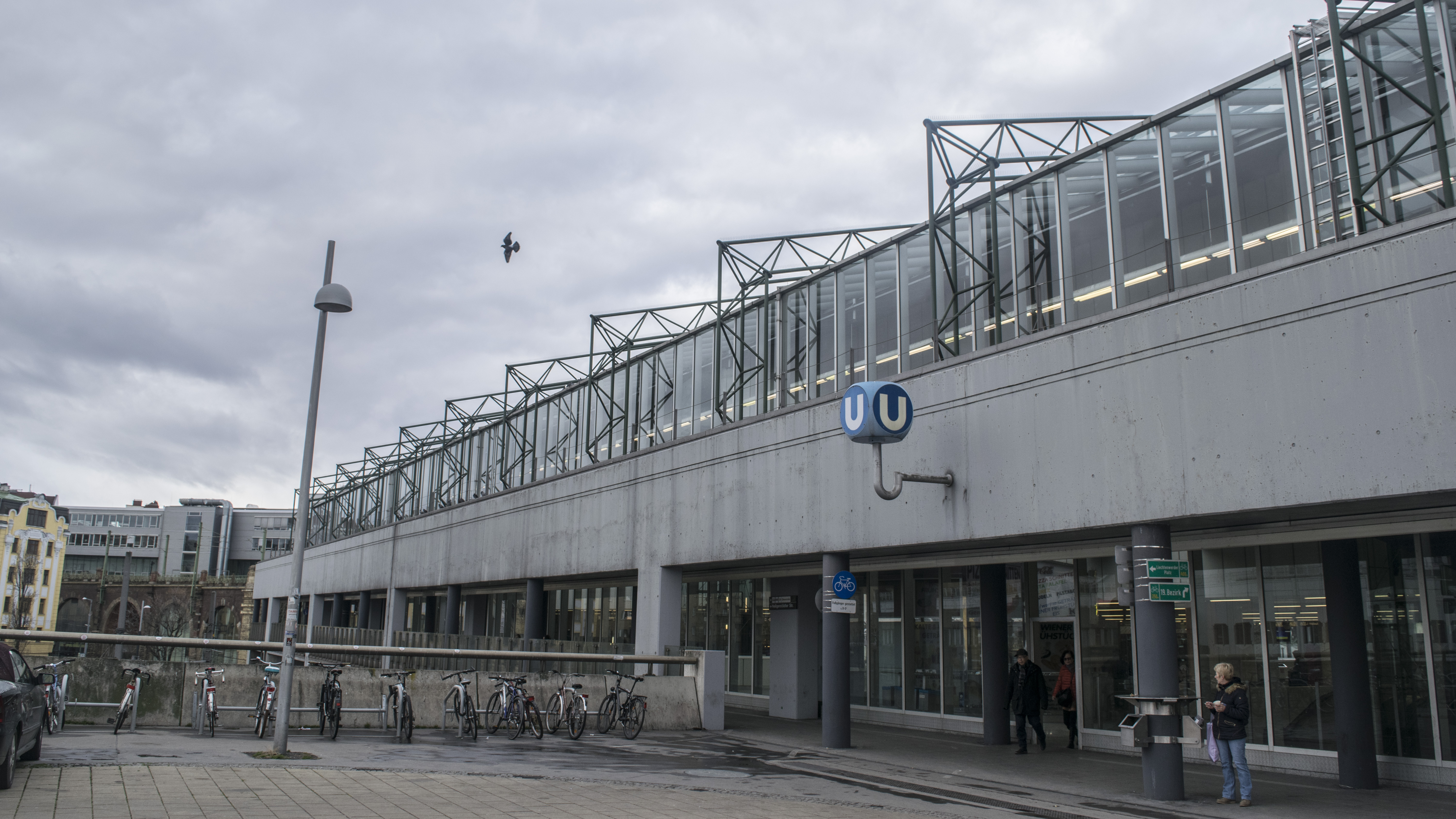
Top level of the Spittelau transit center, located near the trash burning furnace in Vienna, Austria.

Spittelau is a station on U4 and U6 of the Vienna U-Bahn. It combines with Wien Spittelau railway station, which is operated by the Austrian Federal Railways (ÖBB), to form a multistorey interchange station.

The U4 platforms at Spittelau, along with the ÖBB platforms served by regional trains and by line S40 of the Vienna S-Bahn, are at ground level. Above these platforms, and crossing them at right angles, are the U6 platforms.

The whole interchange station complex is located in the Alsergrund District. The U-Bahn station opened in 1995.
