= Perfektastraße station =

Vienna U-Bahn station

Perfektastraße
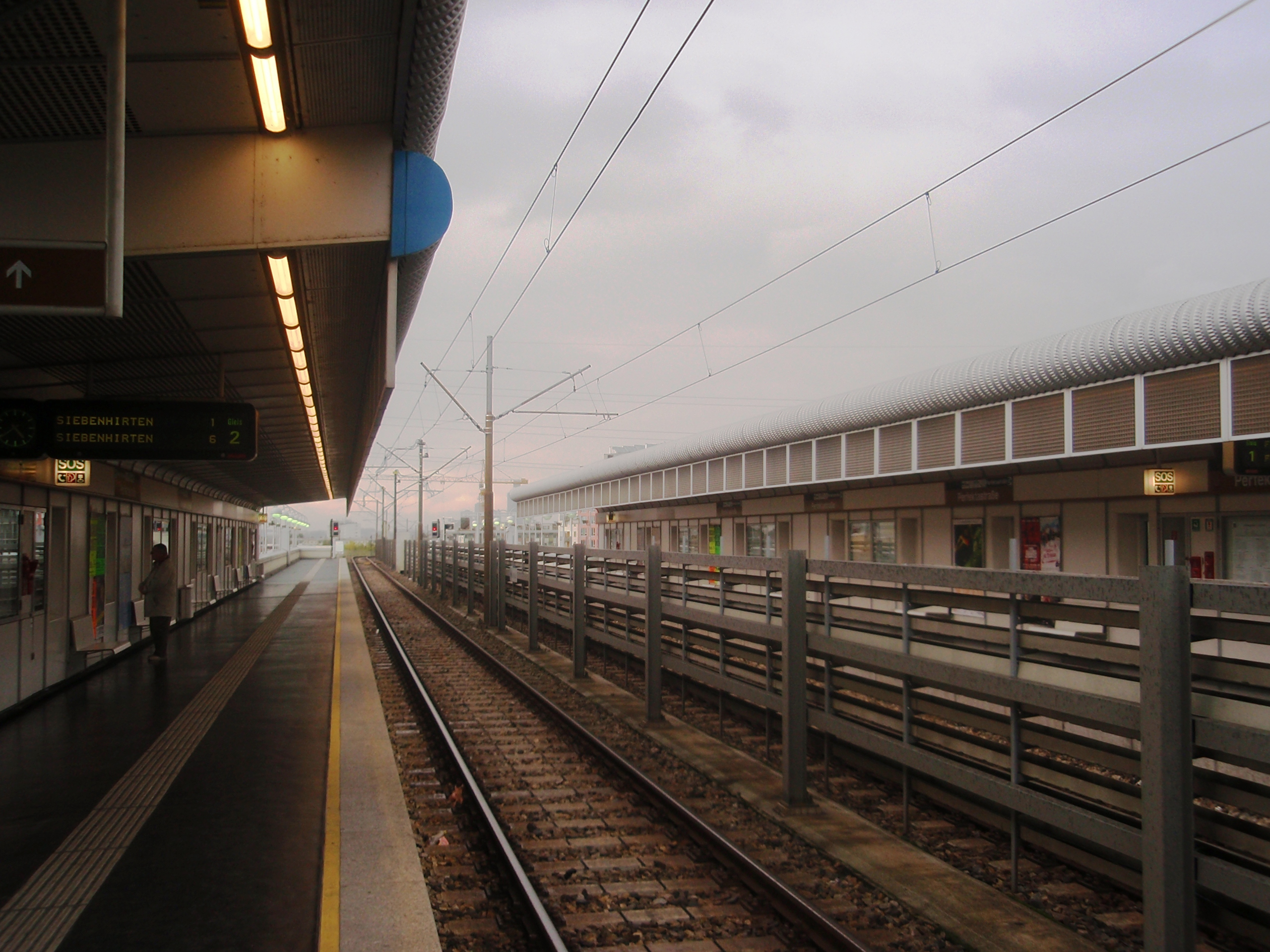

General information
- Location: Liesing, Vienna; Austria
- Coordinates: 48°8′12″N 16°18′48″E
- System: Vienna U-Bahn rapid transit station
- Line: P+R

History
- Opened: 15 April 1995

Services
Preceding station	Wiener Linien	Following station
Erlaaer Straße toward Floridsdorf	U6	Siebenhirten Terminus
Location

Perfektastraße is a station on U6 of the Vienna U-Bahn. It is located in the Liesing District. It opened on 15 April 1995 as part of the section between Philadelphiabrücke and Siebenhirten.
