= Josefstädter Straße station =

Vienna U-Bahn station

Josefstädter Straße
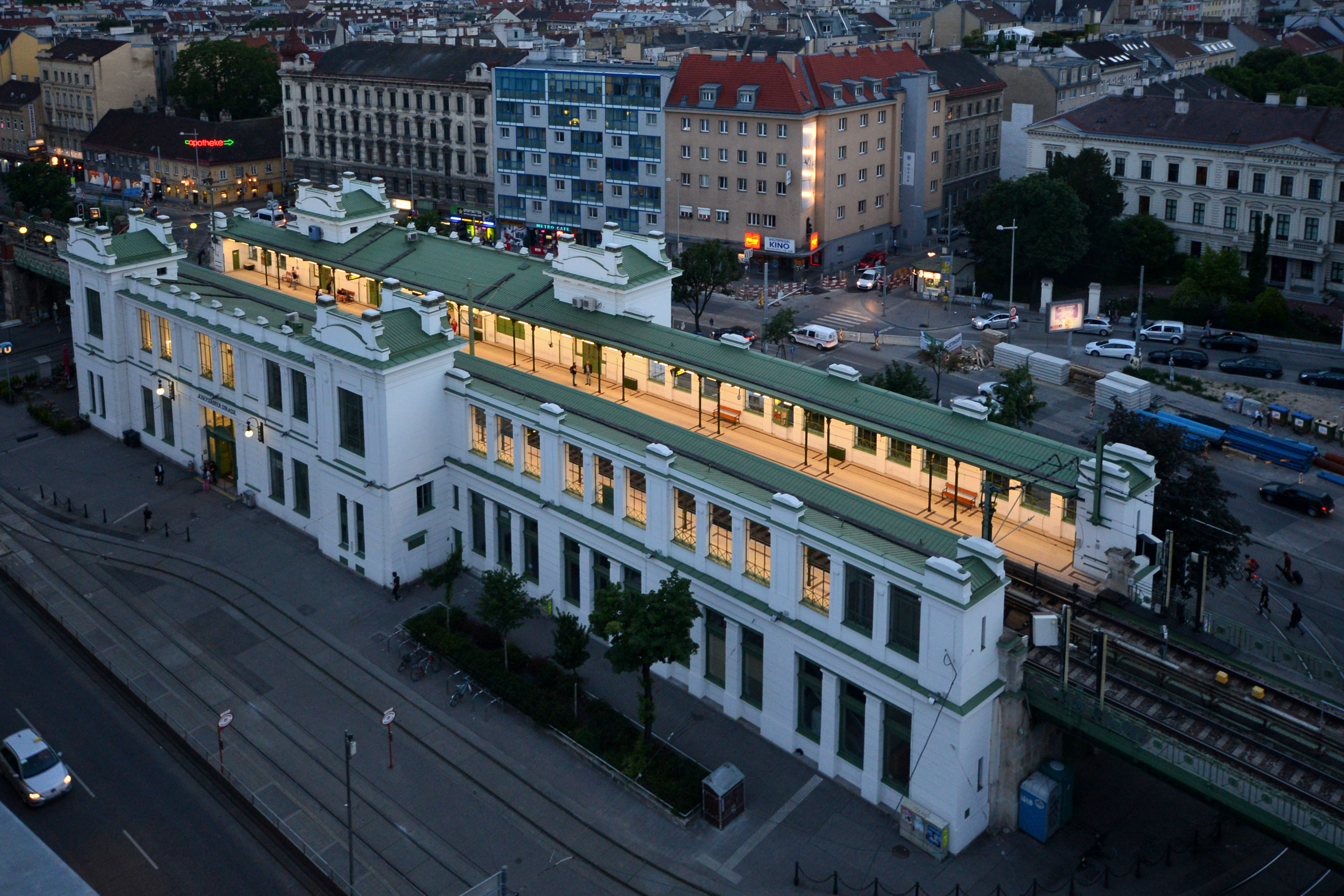

General information
- Location: Josefstadt, Vienna; Austria
- Coordinates: 48.2115°N 16.3392°E

History
- Opened: 7 October 1989

Services
Preceding station	Wiener Linien	Following station
Alser Straße toward Floridsdorf	U6	Thaliastraße toward Siebenhirten
Location

Josefstädter Straße is a station on U6 of the Vienna U-Bahn. It is located in the Josefstadt District. It opened in 1989.
