= Michelbeuern-AKH station =

Vienna U-Bahn station

Michelbeuern-AKH
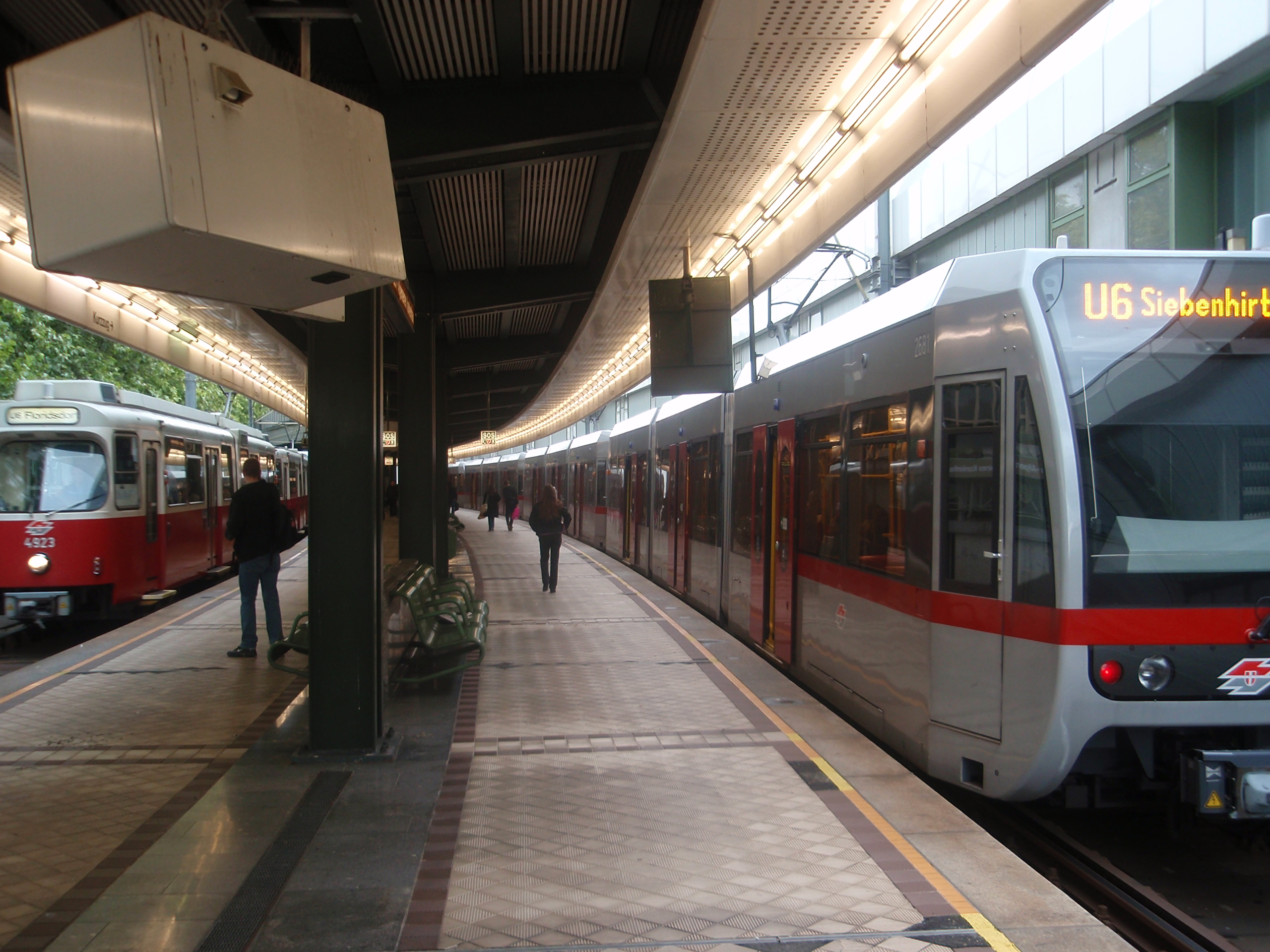

General information
- Location: Alsergrund, Vienna; Austria
- Coordinates: 48.2213°N 16.3442°E

History
- Opened: 7 October 1989

Services
Preceding station	Wiener Linien	Following station
Währinger Straße-Volksoper toward Floridsdorf	U6	Alser Straße toward Siebenhirten
Location

Michelbeuern-AKH is a station on U6 of the Vienna U-Bahn. It is located in the Alsergrund District and is the station that serves the Vienna General Hospital (AKH). It opened in 1989. Passengers can change to the tram line 42.
