= Währinger Straße-Volksoper station =

Vienna U-Bahn station

Währinger Straße-Volksoper
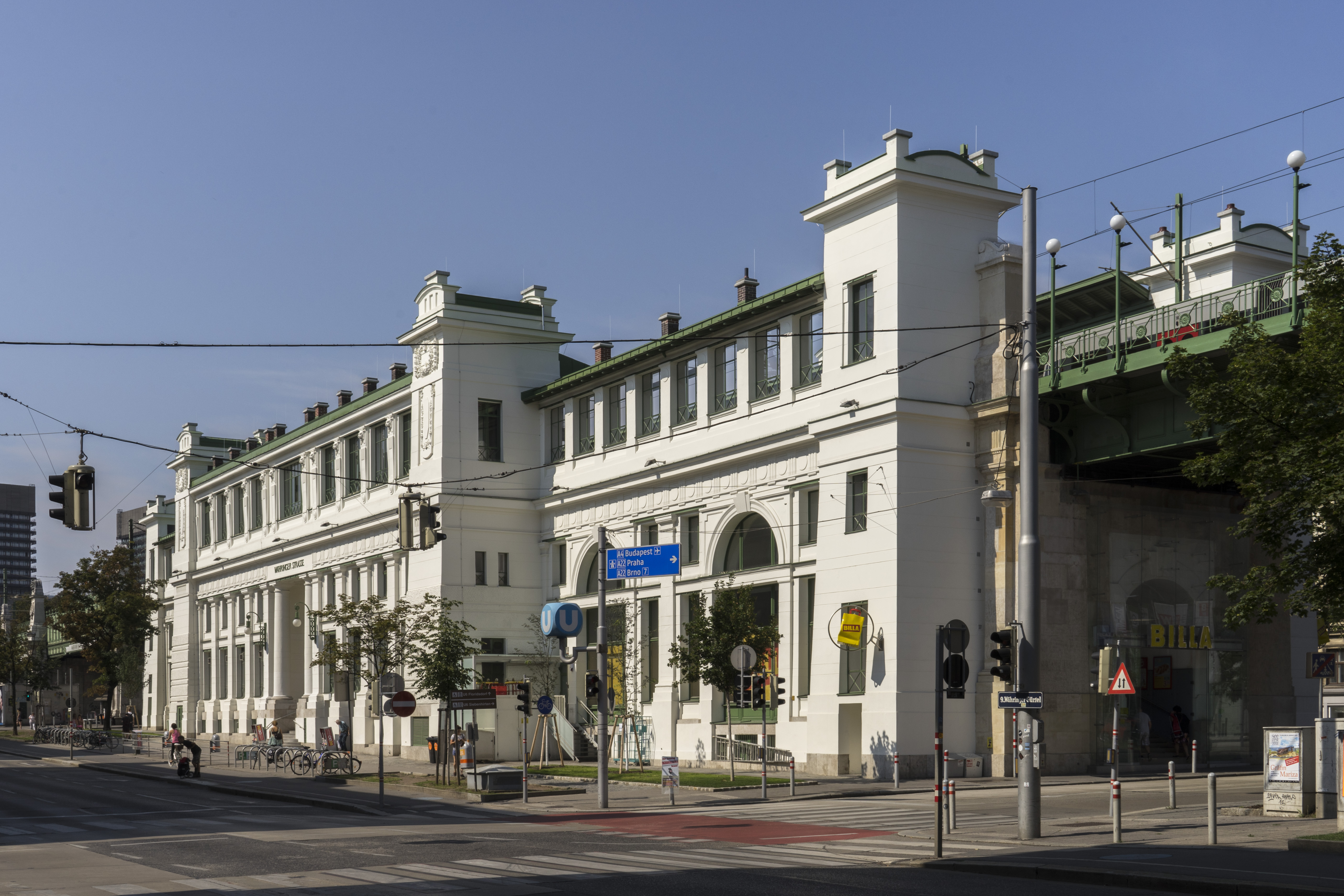

General information
- Location: Alsergrund, Vienna; Austria
- Coordinates: 48.2255°N 16.3495°E

History
- Opened: 7 October 1989

Services
Preceding station	Wiener Linien	Following station
Nußdorfer Straße toward Floridsdorf	U6	Michelbeuern-AKH toward Siebenhirten
Location

Währinger Straße-Volksoper is a station on U6 of the Vienna U-Bahn. It is located in the Alsergrund District. It opened in 1989.
