= Dresdner Straße station =

Vienna U-Bahn station

Dresdner Straße
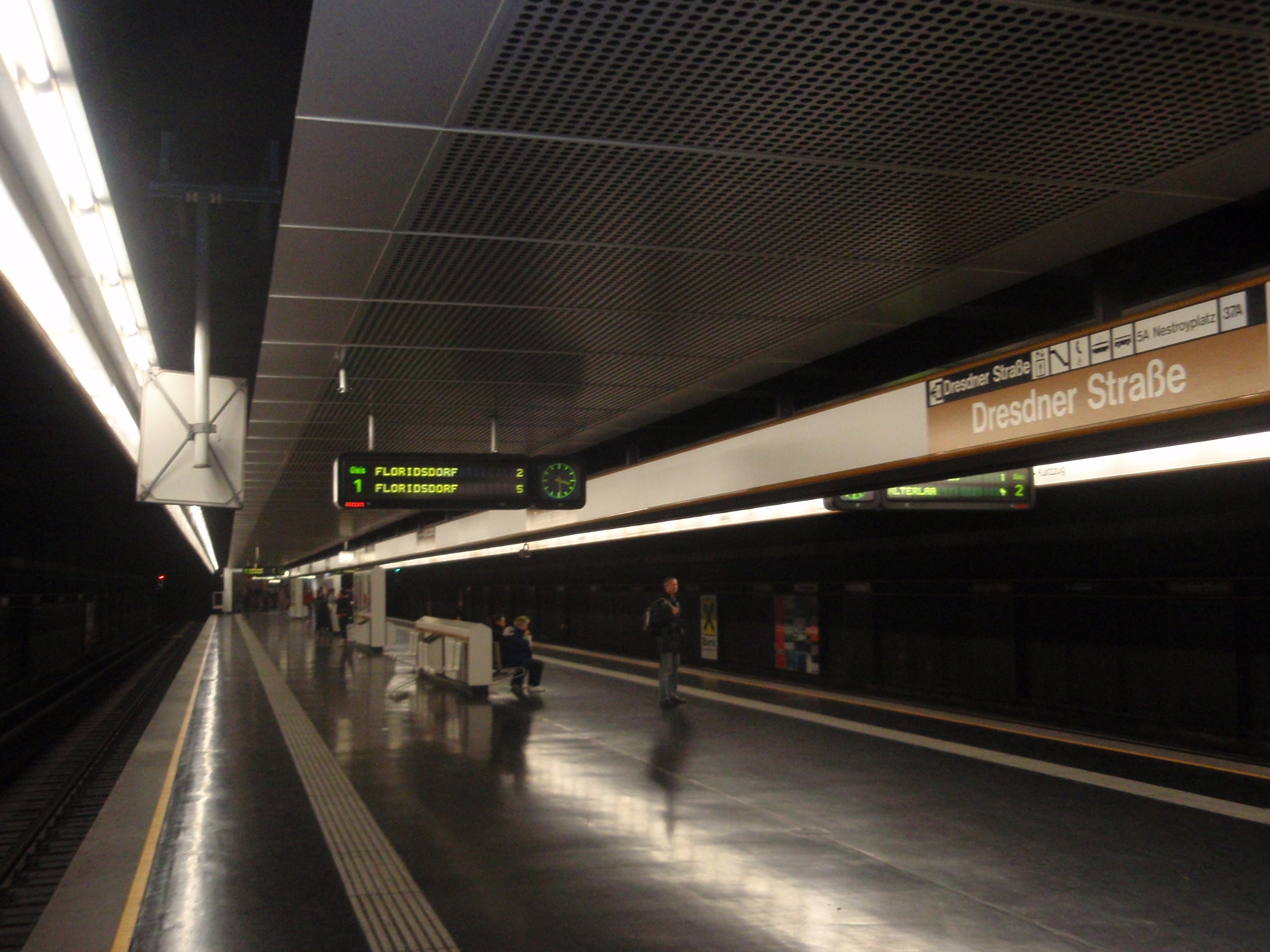

General information
- Location: Brigittenau, Vienna; Austria
- Coordinates: 48.2368°N 16.3792°E

History
- Opened: 1996

Services
Preceding station	Wiener Linien	Following station
Handelskai toward Floridsdorf	U6	Jägerstraße toward Siebenhirten
Location

Dresdner Straße is a station on U6 of the Vienna U-Bahn. It is located in the Brigittenau District. It opened in 1996.
