= Gumpendorfer Straße station =

Vienna U-Bahn station

Gumpendorfer Straße
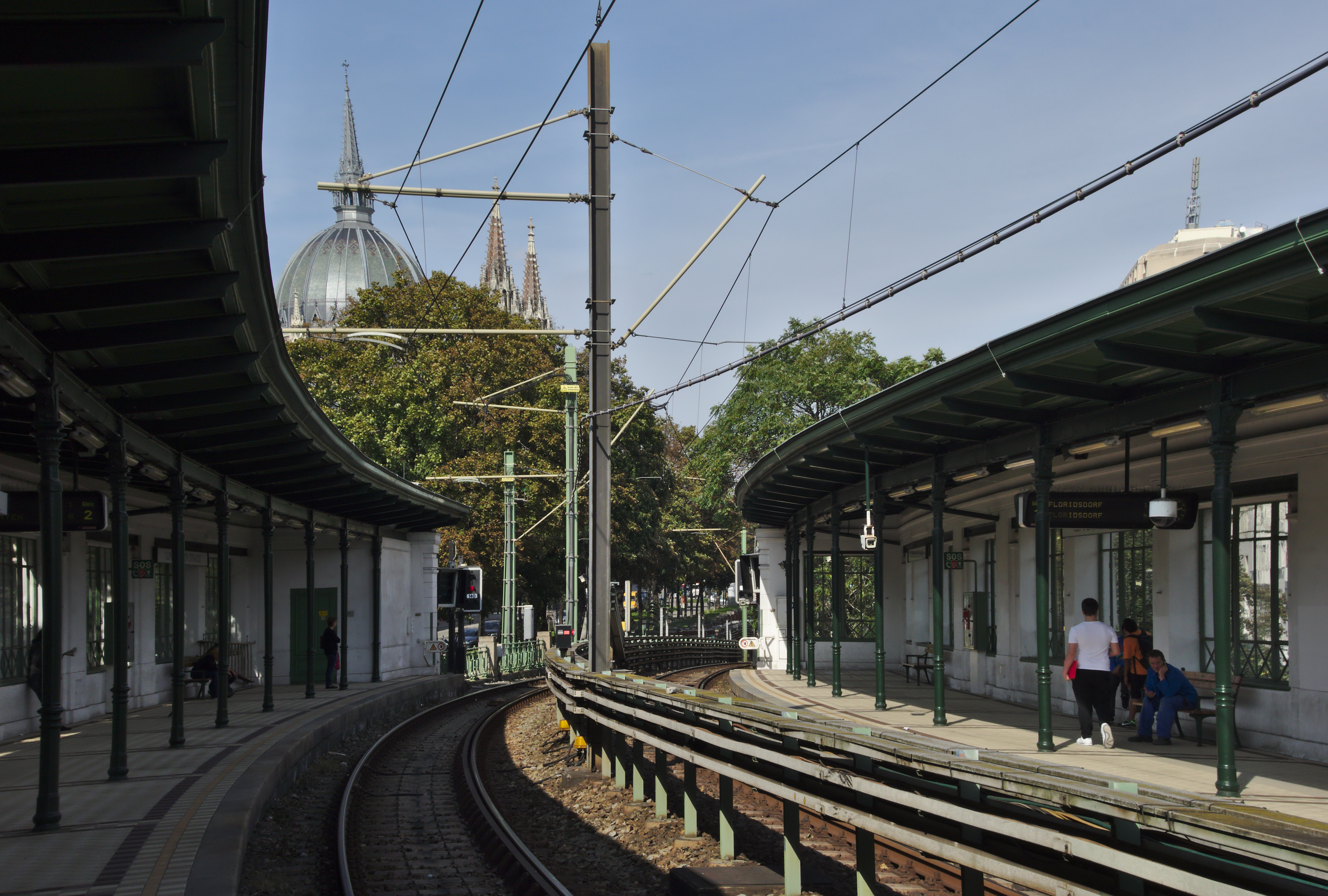

General information
- Location: Mariahilf, Vienna; Austria
- Coordinates: 48.1909°N 16.3375°E
- System: Vienna U-Bahn rapid transit station

History
- Opened: 7 October 1989

Services
Preceding station	Wiener Linien	Following station
Westbahnhof toward Floridsdorf	U6	Längenfeldgasse toward Siebenhirten
Location

Gumpendorfer Straße is a station on U6 of the Vienna U-Bahn. It is located in the Mariahilf District. It opened in 1989.
