= Tscherttegasse station =

Vienna U-Bahn station

Tscherttegasse
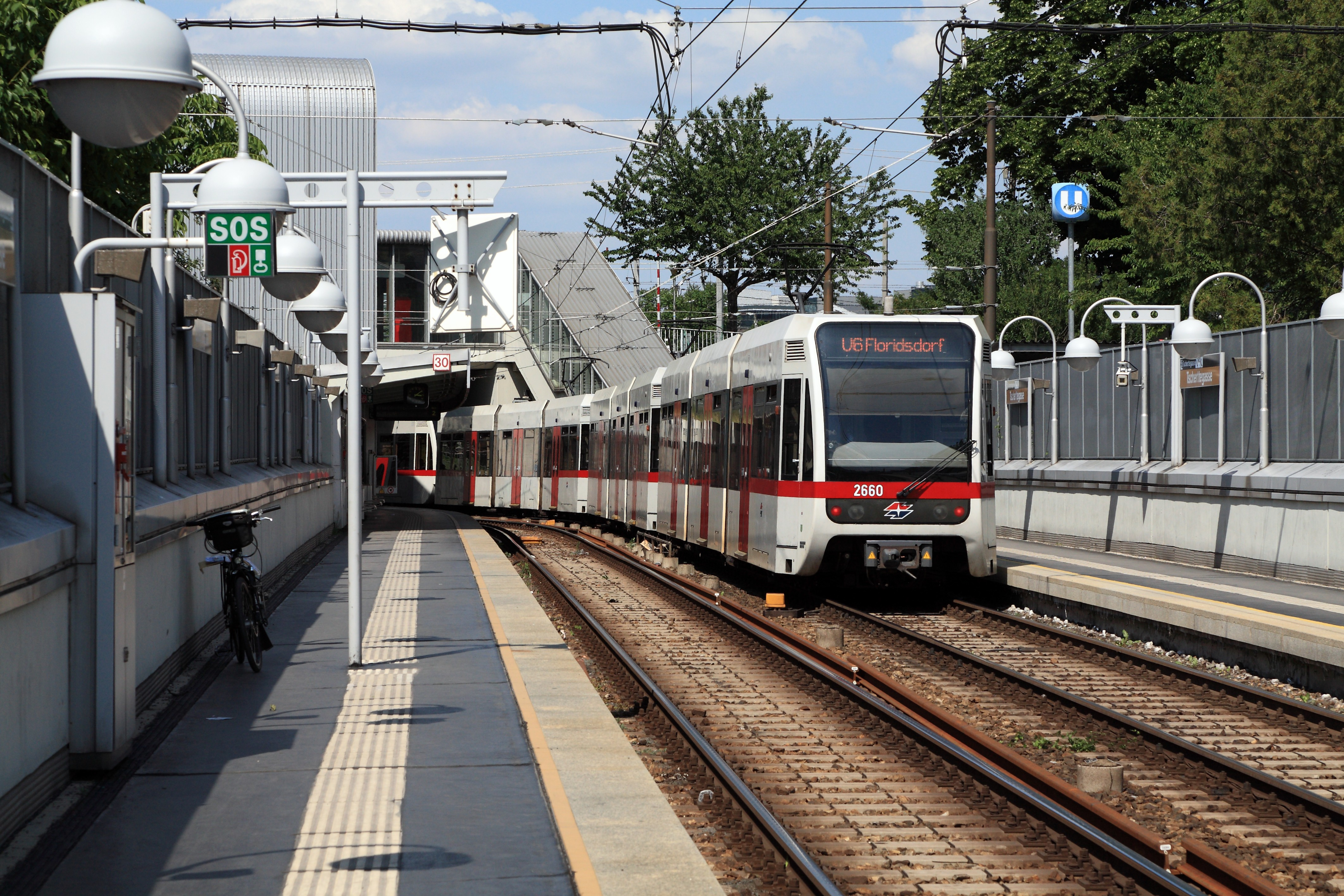

General information
- Location: Meidling, Vienna; Austria
- Coordinates: 48.1651°N 16.3279°E
- System: Vienna U-Bahn rapid transit station

History
- Opened: 15 April 1995

Services
Preceding station	Wiener Linien	Following station
Bahnhof Meidling toward Floridsdorf	U6	Am Schöpfwerk toward Siebenhirten
Location

Tscherttegasse is a station on U6 of the Vienna U-Bahn. It is located in the Meidling District. It opened on 15 April 1995 as part of the extension of the line from Philadelphiabrücke to Siebenhirten.

The station is located at the ground level and has two side platforms. There is one exit from the station.

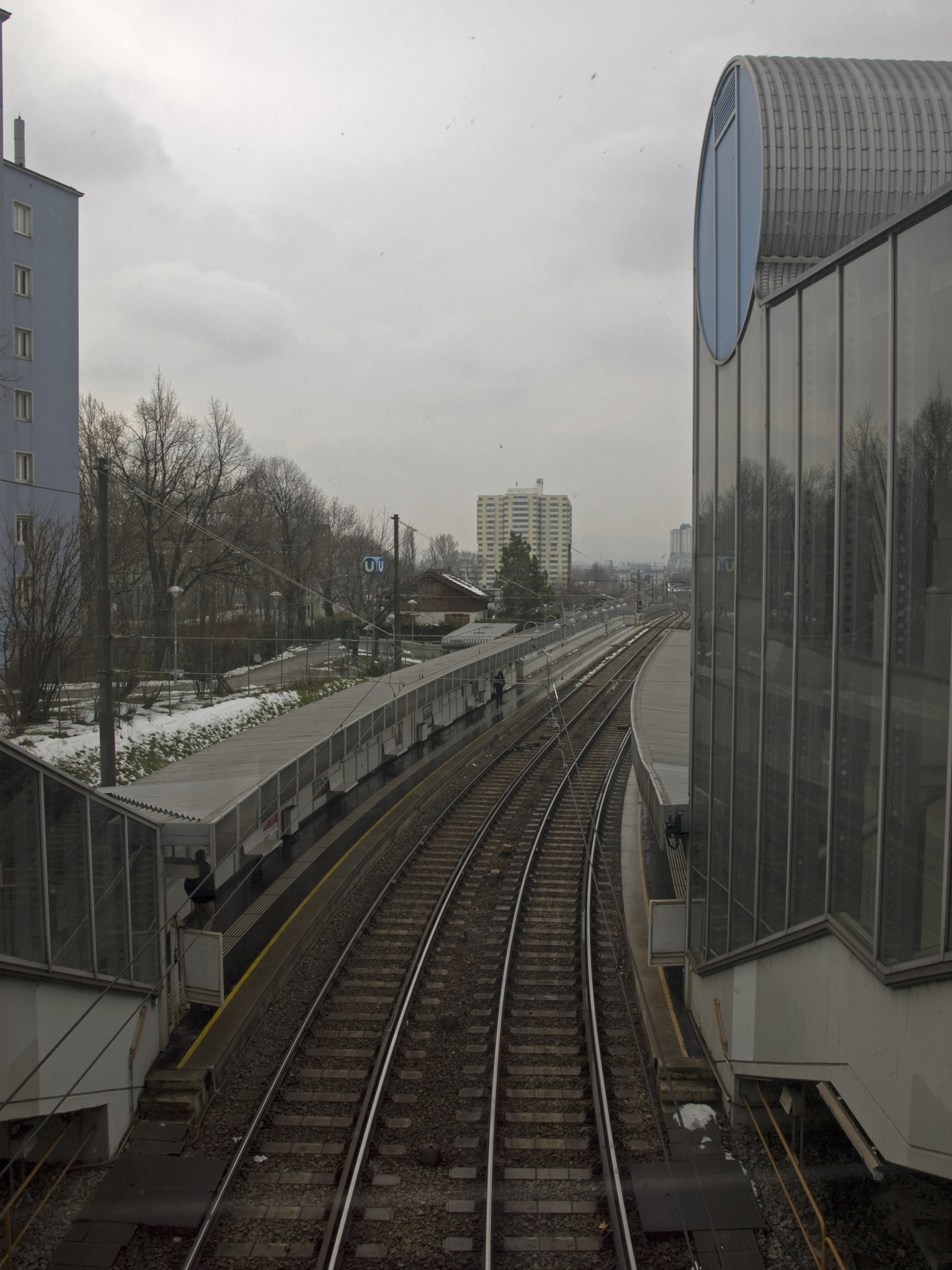
The station from above
