= Nußdorfer Straße station =

Vienna U-Bahn station

Nußdorfer Straße
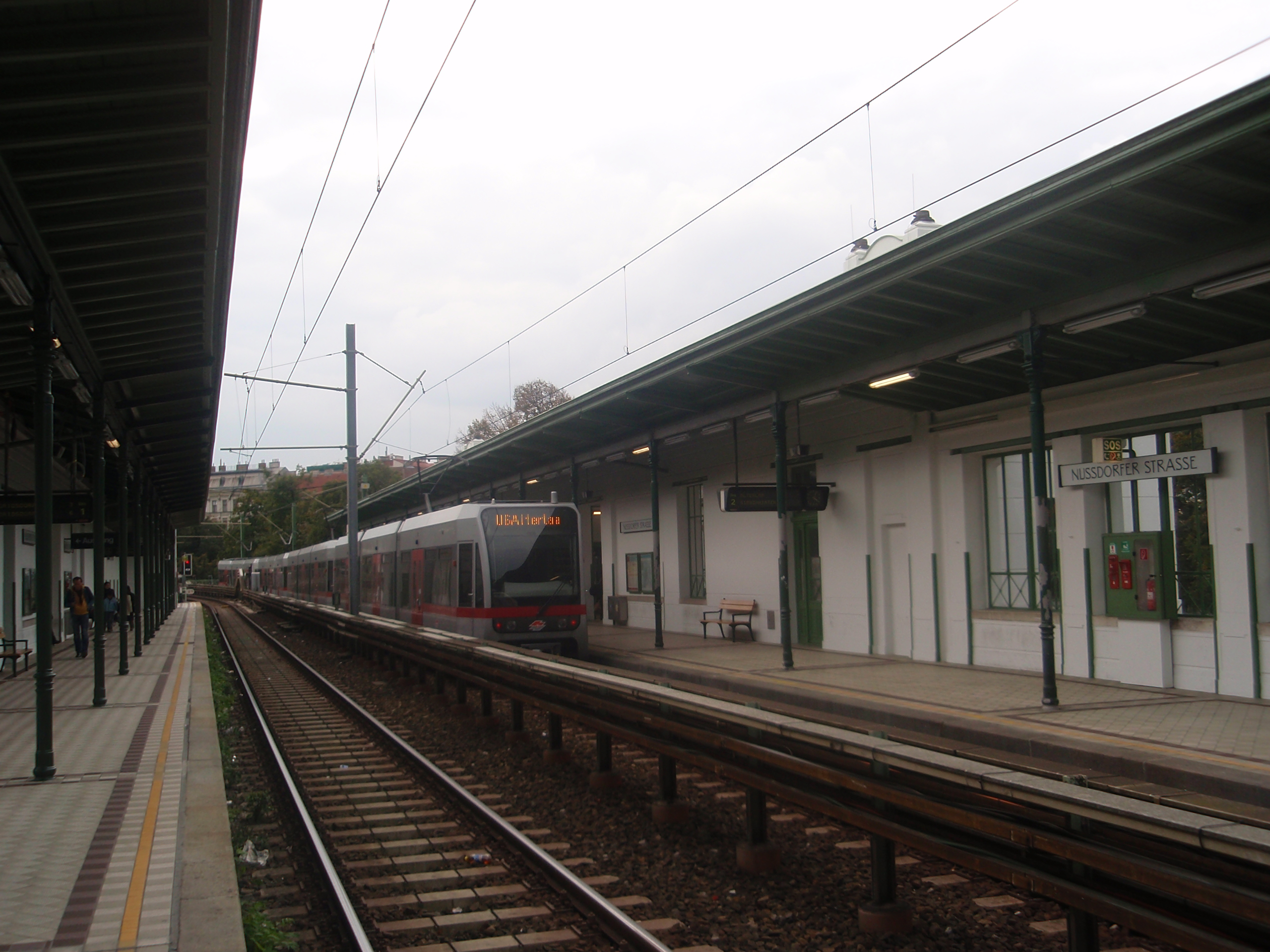

General information
- Location: Alsergrund, Vienna; Austria
- Coordinates: 48.2313°N 16.3524°E

History
- Opened: 7 October 1989

Services
Preceding station	Wiener Linien	Following station
Spittelau toward Floridsdorf	U6	Währinger Straße-Volksoper toward Siebenhirten
Location

Nußdorfer Straße is a station on U6 of the Vienna U-Bahn. It is located in the Alsergrund District. It opened in 1989.
