= Handelskai station =

Vienna U-Bahn station

Handelskai
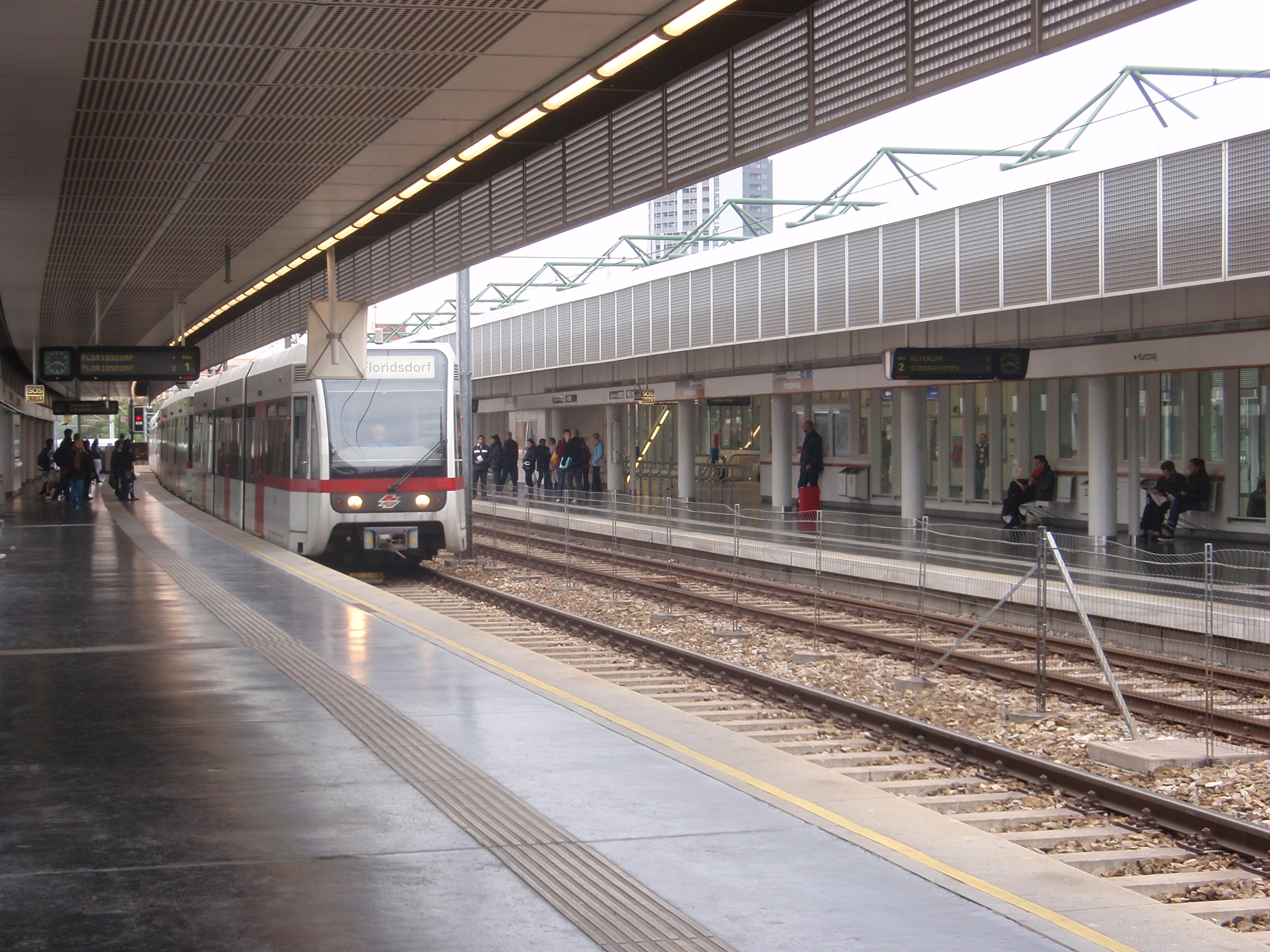

General information
- Location: Brigittenau, Vienna; Austria
- Coordinates: 48.2419°N 16.3855°E
- Lines: (Interchange); (Interchange)

History
- Opened: 1996

Services
Preceding station	Wiener Linien	Following station
Neue Donau toward Floridsdorf	U6	Dresdner Straße toward Siebenhirten
Location

Handelskai is a station on U6 of the Vienna U-Bahn. It combines with Wien Handelskai railway station, which is operated by the Austrian Federal Railways (ÖBB), to form a multistorey interchange station.

The U6 platforms at Handelskai are at a high level, alongside the ÖBB platforms served by regional trains and by Vienna S-Bahn lines S1, S2, S3 and S7.

Below these platforms, and at right angles to them, are the street level platforms of the Wien Handelskai terminus of line S45.

The whole interchange station complex is located in the Brigittenau District. The U-Bahn station opened in 1996.
