= Längenfeldgasse station =

Vienna U-Bahn station

Längenfeldgasse
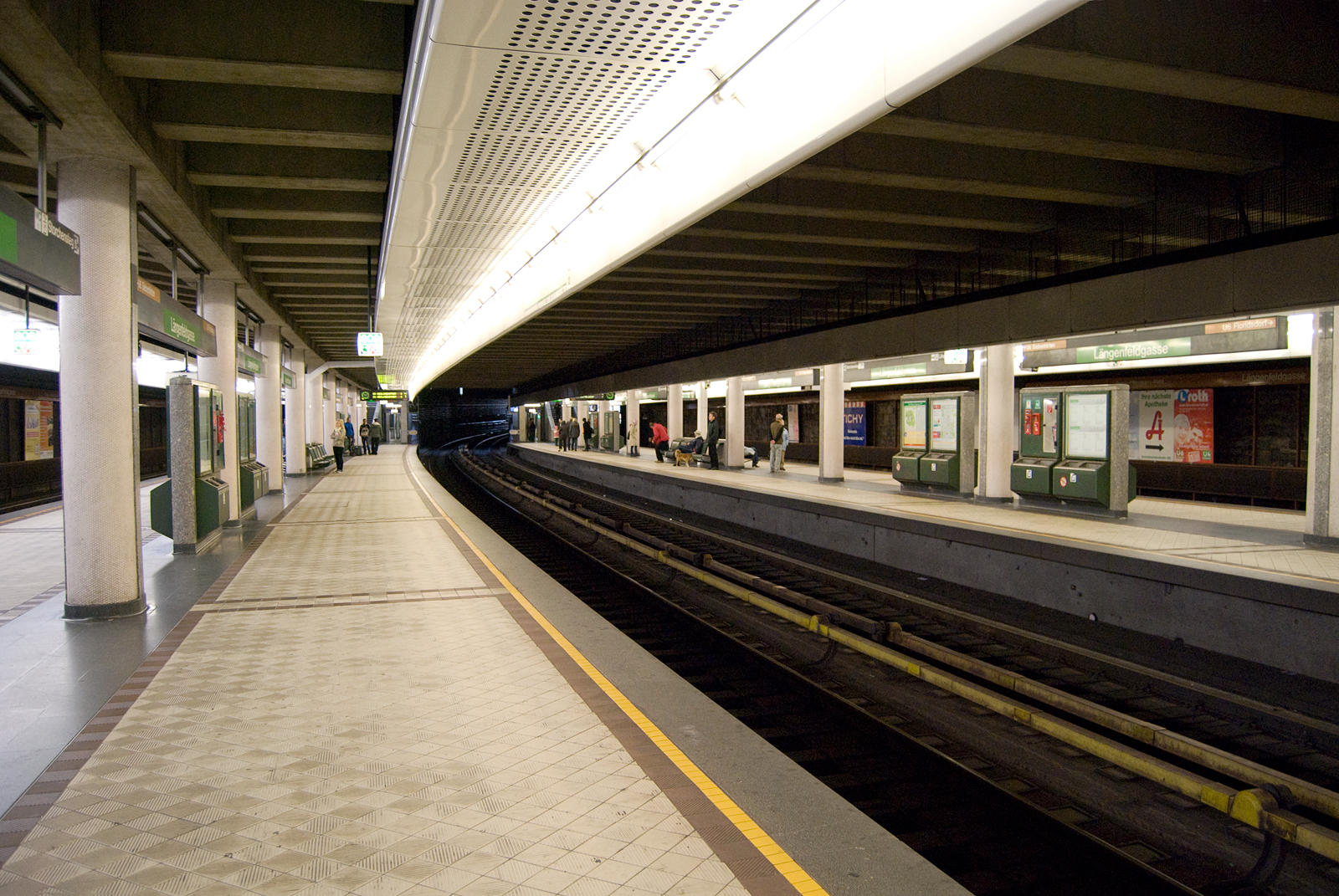

General information
- Location: Meidling, Vienna; Austria
- Coordinates: 48.1845°N 16.3344°E
- System: Vienna U-Bahn rapid transit station

History
- Opened: 1989

Services
Preceding station	Wiener Linien	Following station
Meidling Hauptstraße toward Hütteldorf	U4	Margaretengürtel toward Heiligenstadt
Gumpendorfer Straße toward Floridsdorf	U6	Niederhofstraße toward Siebenhirten
Location

Längenfeldgasse is a cross-platform interchange station on U4 and U6 of the Vienna U-Bahn, Austria. It is located in the Meidling District. It opened in 1989.
