= Jägerstraße station =

Vienna U-Bahn station

Jägerstraße
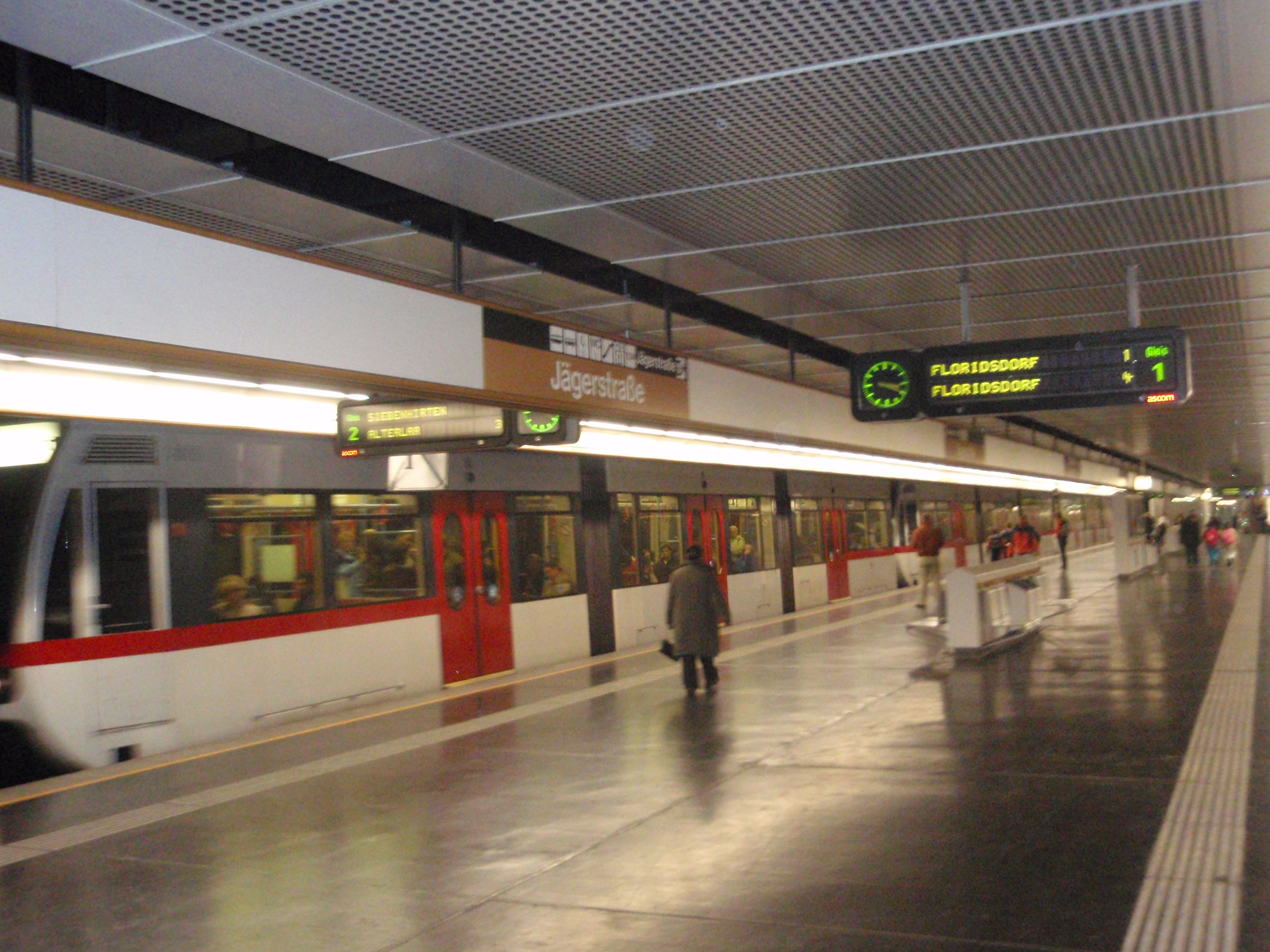

General information
- Location: Brigittenau, Vienna; Austria
- Coordinates: 48.2352°N 16.3698°E

History
- Opened: 1996

Services
Preceding station	Wiener Linien	Following station
Dresdner Straße toward Floridsdorf	U6	Spittelau toward Siebenhirten
Location

Jägerstraße is a station on U6 of the Vienna U-Bahn. It is located in the Brigittenau District. It opened in 1996.
