= Niederhofstraße station =

Vienna U-Bahn station

Niederhofstraße
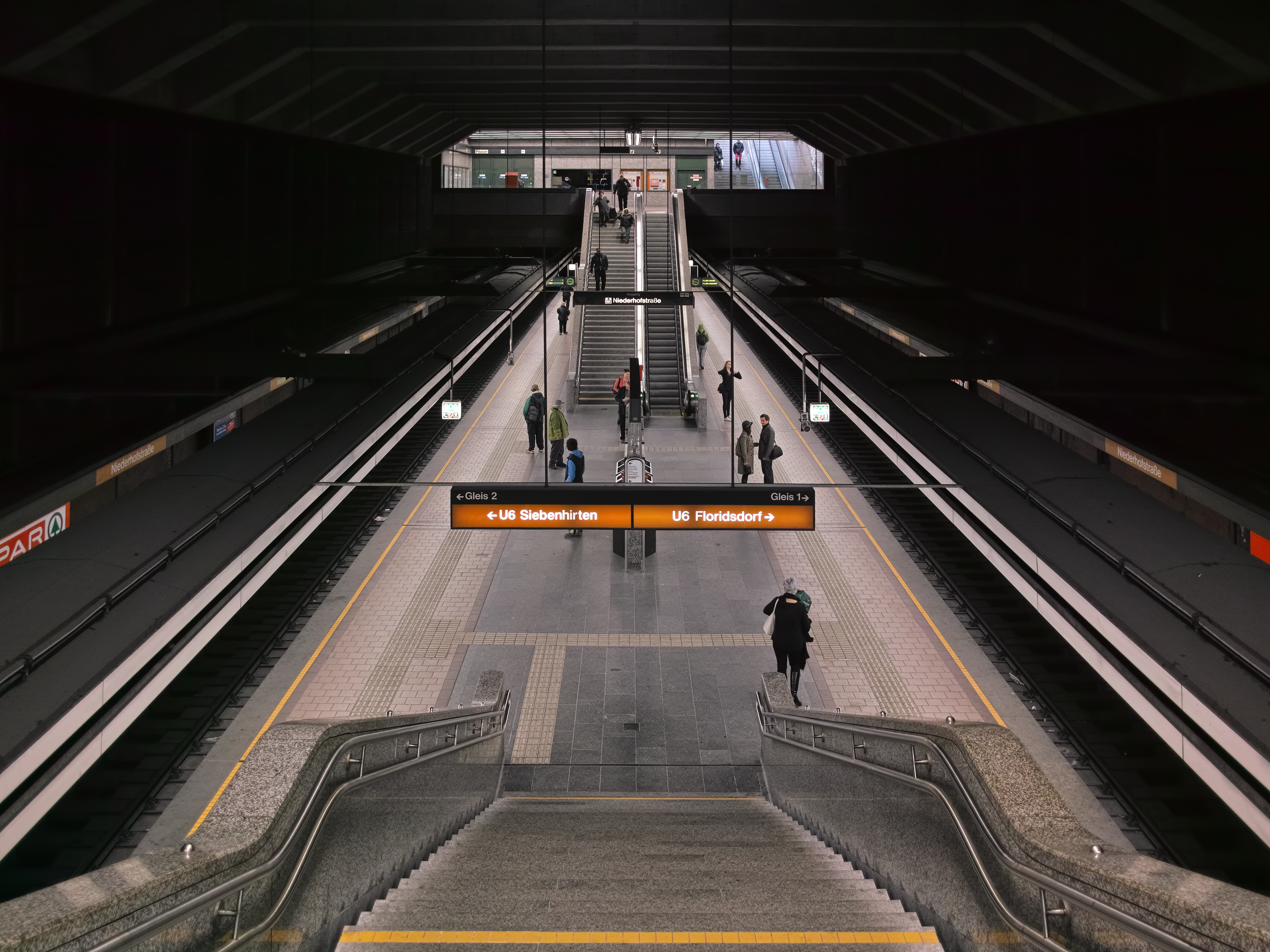

General information
- Location: Meidling, Vienna; Austria
- Coordinates: 48.1812°N 16.3313°E
- System: Vienna U-Bahn rapid transit station

History
- Opened: 7 October 1989

Services
Preceding station	Wiener Linien	Following station
Längenfeldgasse toward Floridsdorf	U6	Bahnhof Meidling toward Siebenhirten
Location

Niederhofstraße is a station on U6 of the Vienna U-Bahn. It is located in the Meidling District. It opened in 1989.
