= Alser Straße station =

Vienna U-Bahn station

Alser Straße
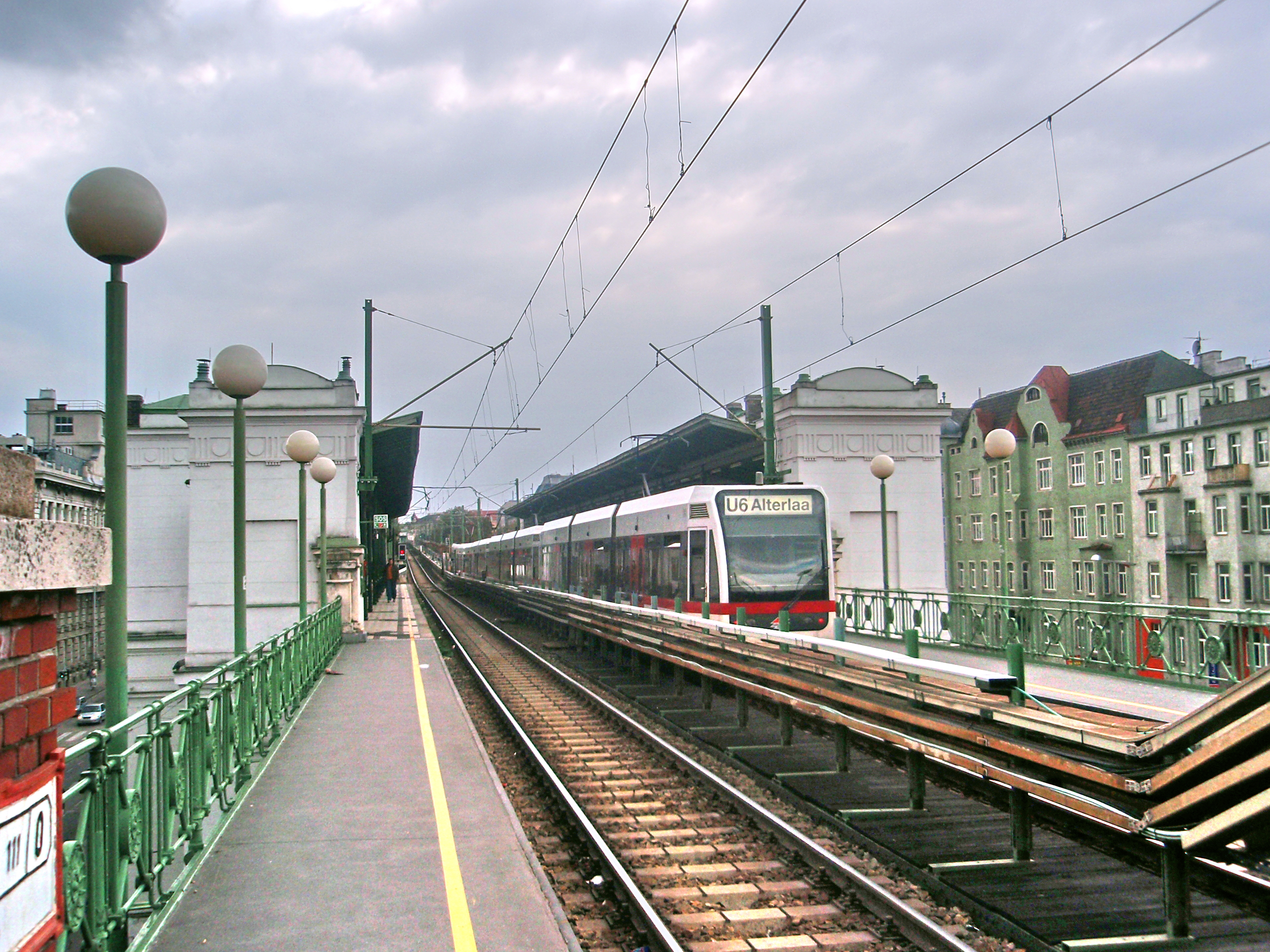

General information
- Location: Alsergrund, Vienna; Austria
- Coordinates: 48.2168°N 16.3418°E

History
- Opened: 7 October 1989

Services
Preceding station	Wiener Linien	Following station
Michelbeuern-AKH toward Floridsdorf	U6	Josefstädter Straße toward Siebenhirten
Location

Alser Straße is a station on U6 of the Vienna U-Bahn. It is located in the Alsergrund District. It opened in 1989.

== History ==
The station was originally part of the Gürtellinie of the Wiener Stadtbahn and was designed by Otto Wagner on behalf of the "Commission für Verkehrsanlagen in Wien". Its construction was finished in March 1896 and was commissioned on the 1st of June 1898. In 1918 it was closed and reopened in 1925 as a part of the newly electrified Vienna Stadtbahn. In addition to the light rail lines, the combined tram and light rail line 18G also served the station from 1925 to 1945. Since 1989 has been serving as a station of the U6.

In 2014/15 the western part of the station went through a months-long renovation.

== Architectural style ==
The building is entered from the east- and west sides through the iconic green swing doors. From the entrance hall, two flights of stair lead up to the platforms. Barrier-free access is available, using elevators at the Äußerer Hernalser Gürtel access. Passengers can change to the tram lines 43 and 44. In its surroundings there are the Saint Anna children's hospital and the nightlife mile along the western belt with numerous bars.
