= Alterlaa =

Residential development in Vienna, Austria

Coordinates: 48°09′08″N 16°18′47″E

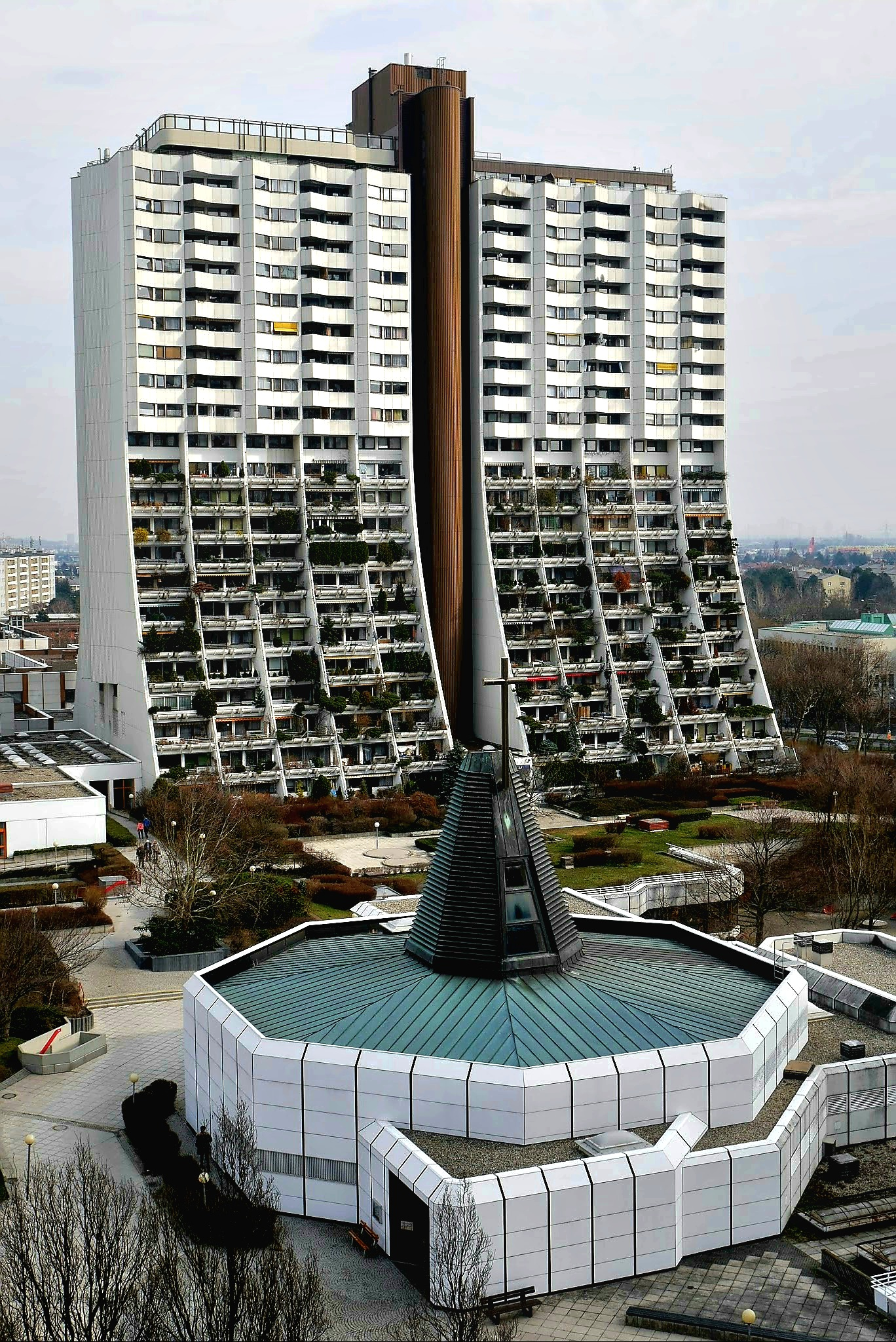
One of the housing buildings, with church in the foreground

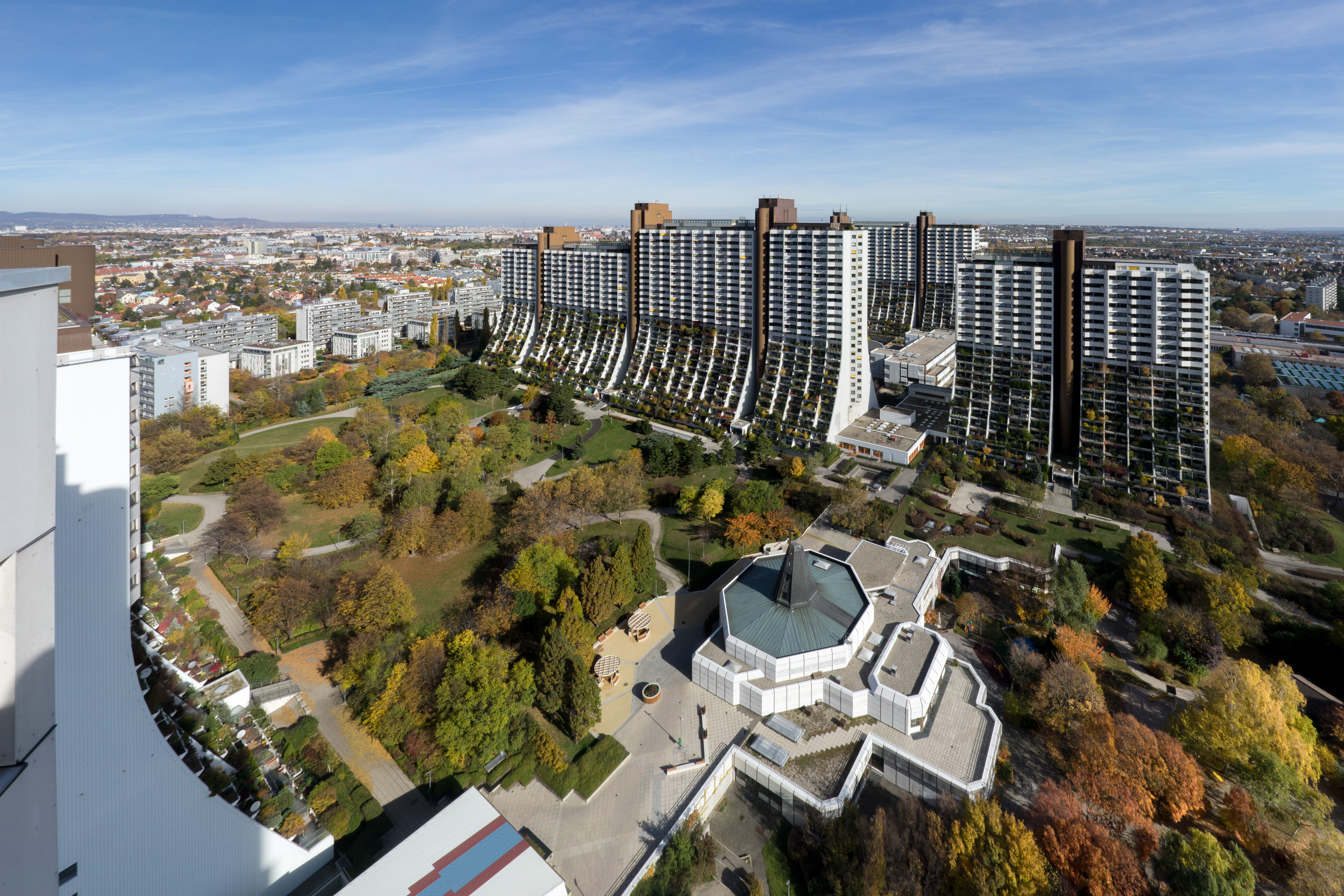
A view from block C to block B, with block A in the background

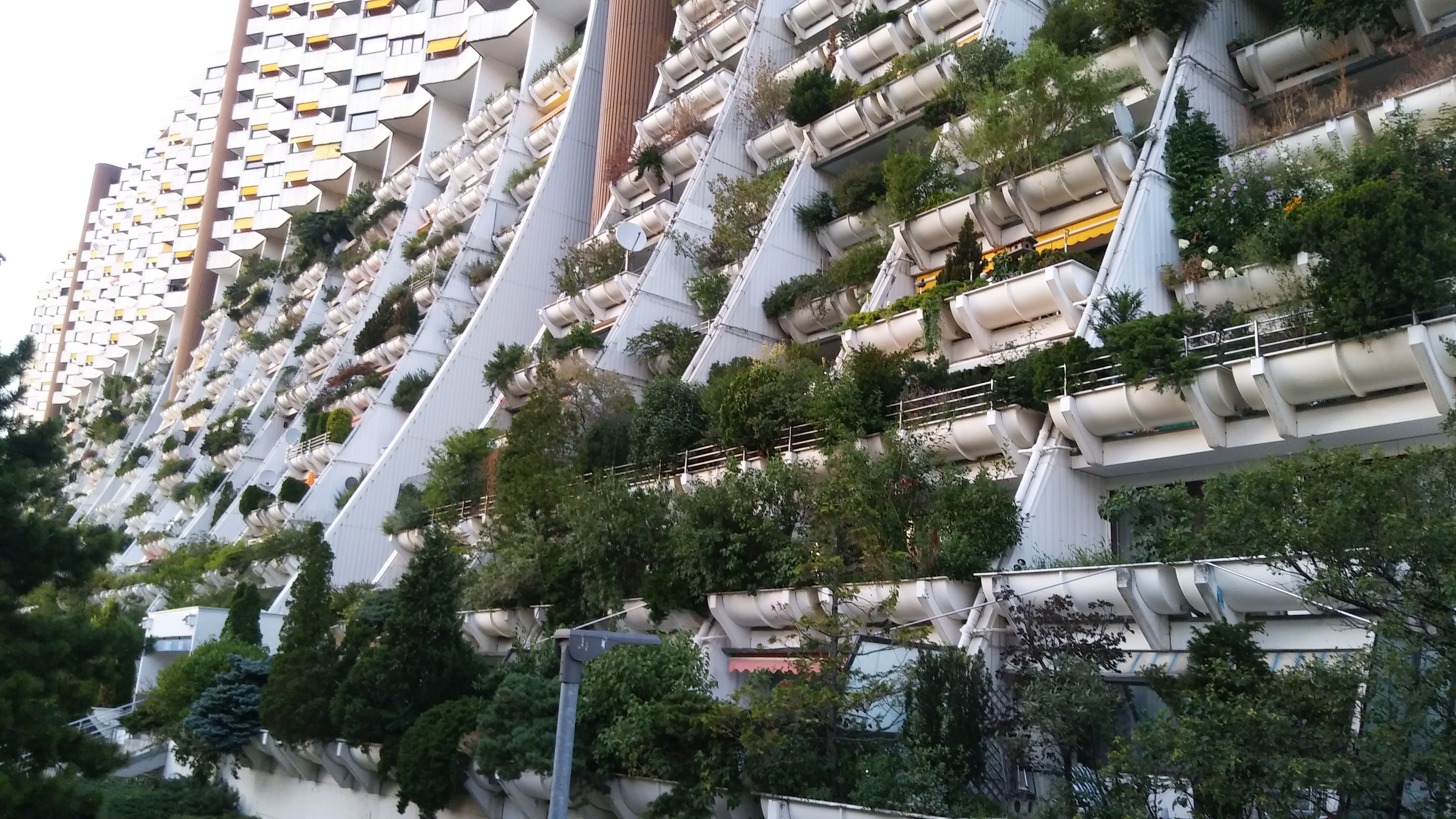
Greenery on balconies

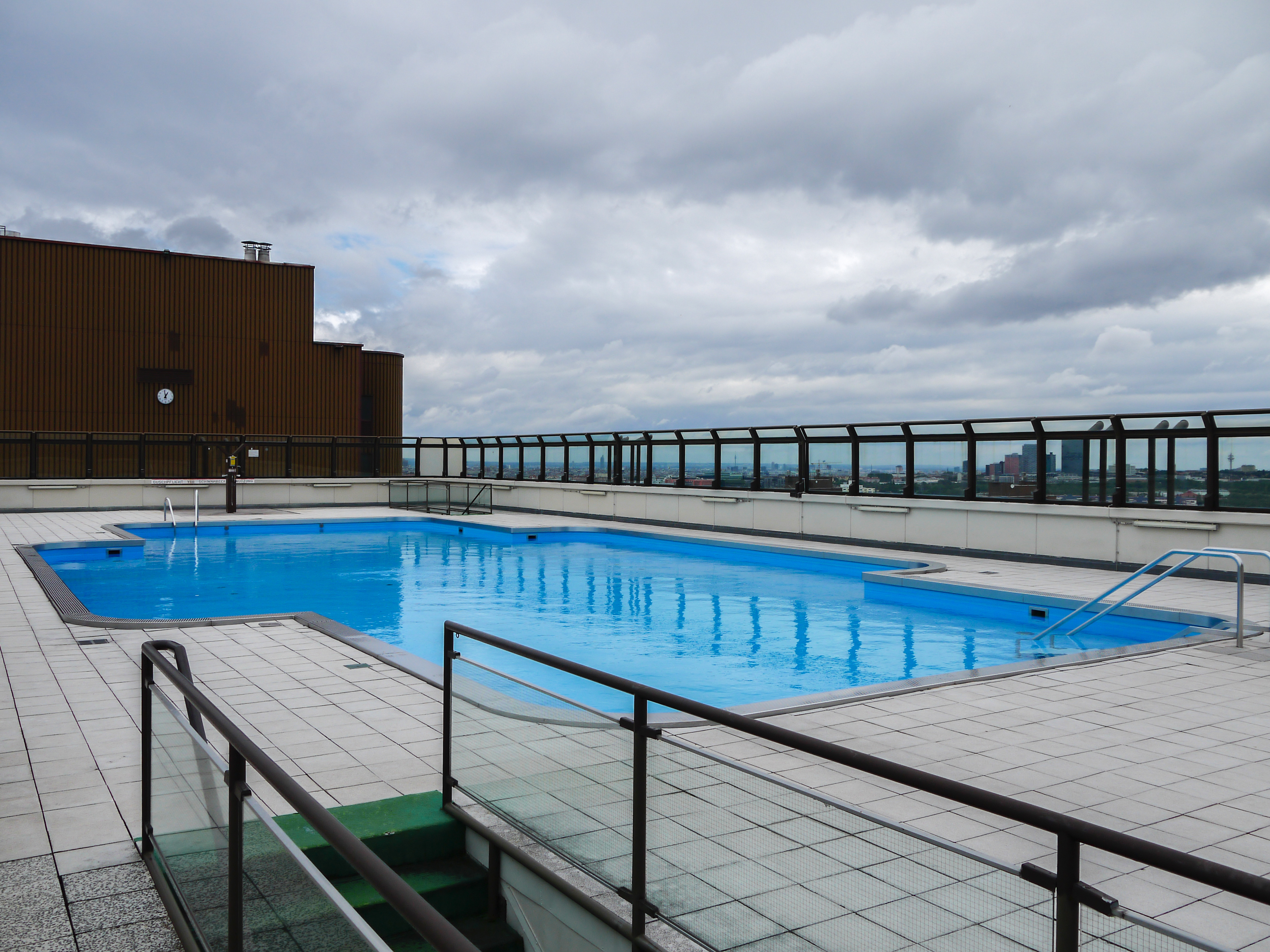
Rooftop swimming pool

Alterlaa (Austrian German pronunciation: [altˈɛʁlaː]) is a residential development in Vienna, Austria, designed by Harry Glück. Built from 1975 to 1986, it features distinctive set-backs on its lower floors and large terraces with planting troughs for use by residents. It houses around 9,000 people in 3,200 apartments.

== Design ==
The Alterlaa complex was designed by Austrian architect Harry Glück as income-restricted housing. Located to the south-west of central Vienna the site occupies 24 hectares (59 acres) and is one of the largest residential complexes in Austria. Planning for the complex began in 1972, as part of a pilot scheme to expand Vienna with satellite towns. Glück took inspiration from Le Corbusier's 1930s Ville Radieuse and the 1920s designs for terrassenhaus by Adolf Loos and Oskar Strnad. Glück had incorporated a similar set-back profile and garden terrace in his 1971 design of a block for the Junge Generation housing association.

Glück's design for Alterlaa features blocks of housing structures arranged into three north-south lines. The blocks have prominent set-back terraces on the lowest 12 storeys, with a further 10 to 15 vertical-sided storeys above. The construction was carried out by the GESIBA municipal cooperative agency from 1975 to 1986. Glück's intention was to create a "city within a city". The blocks have been described as similar to ziggurats and reminiscent of works carried out by the American Public Works Administration in the New Deal era. The designs have been criticised for having an American influence but the complex has also been cited as an example of how social housing should be built. Alterlaa was reported in 2008 as having the highest tenant satisfaction rating in Vienna.

== Features ==
The complex provides 3,200 apartments and, as of 2022, about 9,000 people lived there. The average apartment size is 74.5 square metres (802 sq ft) with 65 percent of the apartments having three or more rooms. Each terraced apartment has a large balcony with a 4 m^{2} (43 sq ft) trough planter in front of it. Residents plant trees and flowers in the planter, which they are responsible for maintaining.

The site has seven outdoor rooftop swimming pools, seven indoor swimming pools, twenty saunas, two indoor tennis centres and four badminton courts. There is also a church, local television station, shopping centre, newspaper office, medical facility (with at least 12 doctors), kindergartens, schools, library, playgrounds and a park. The entrance foyers of each building host large works of art. There are 3,400 parking spaces for residents, and the complex is near the Alterlaa station on the Vienna U-Bahn.
