= Neue Donau station =

Vienna U-Bahn station

Neue Donau
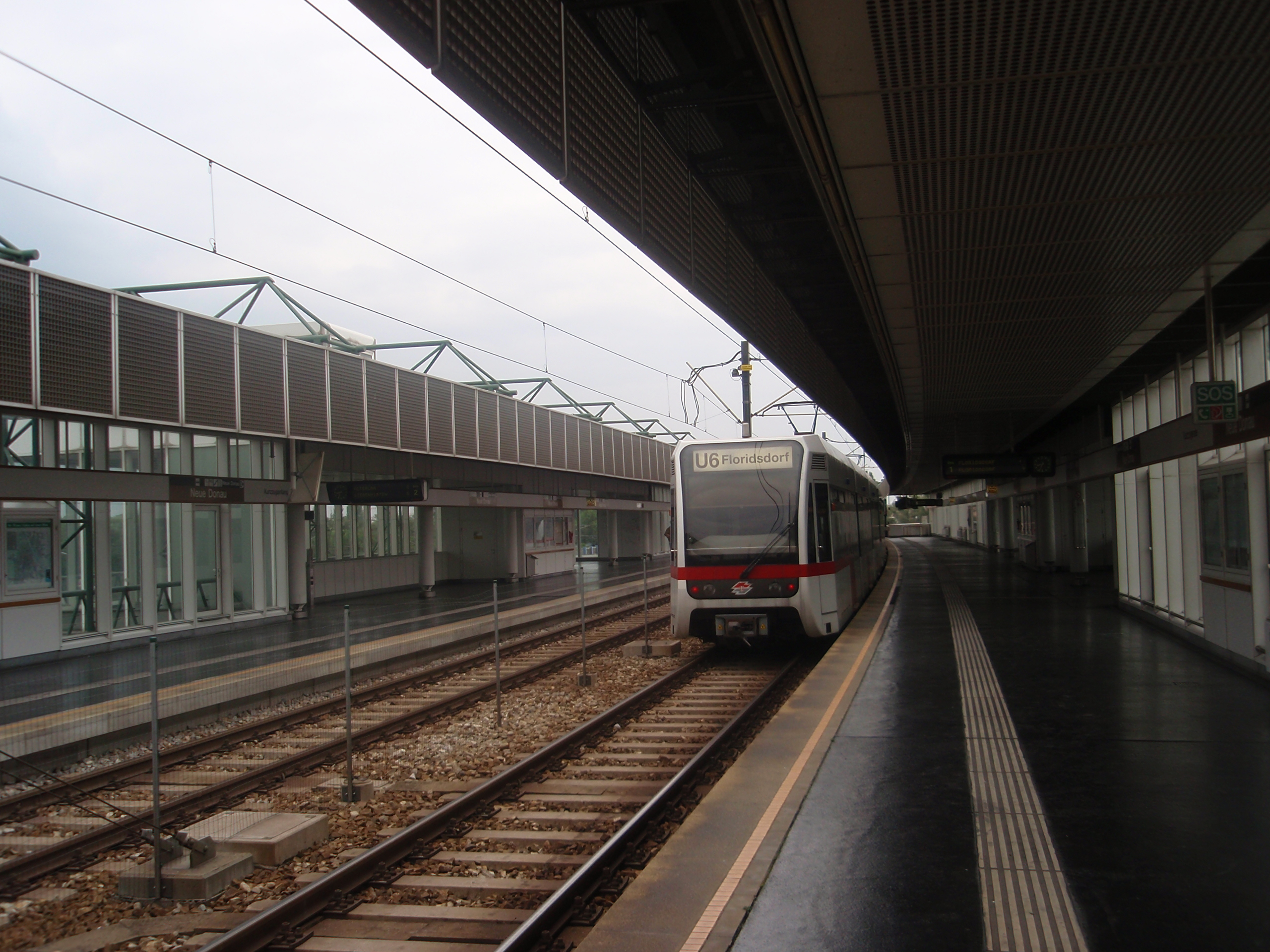

General information
- Location: Floridsdorf, Vienna; Austria
- Coordinates: 48.2465°N 16.3949°E

History
- Opened: 1996

Services
Preceding station	Wiener Linien	Following station
Floridsdorf Terminus	U6	Handelskai toward Siebenhirten
Location

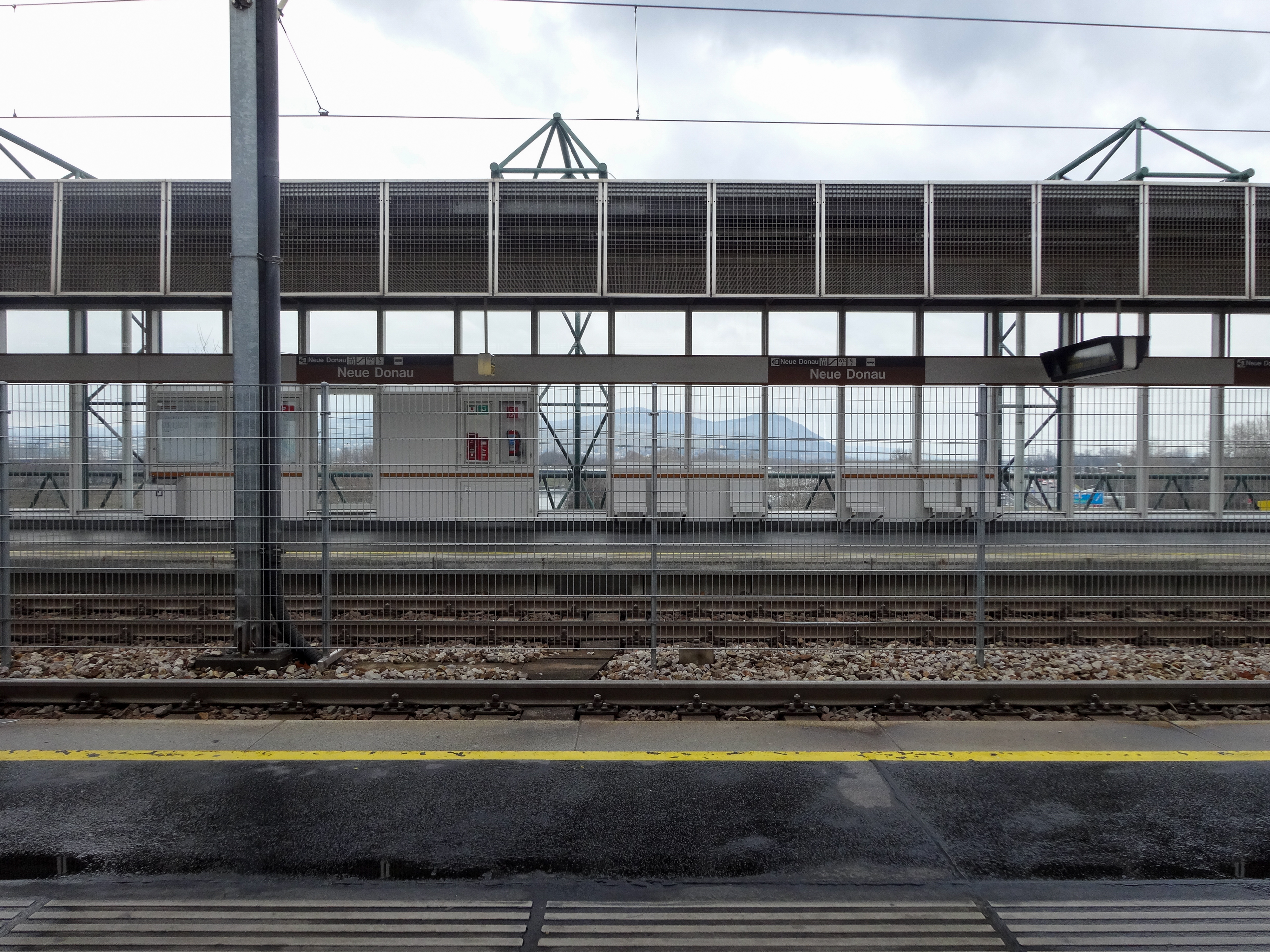
Neue Donau

Neue Donau is a station on U6 of the Vienna U-Bahn. It is located in the Floridsdorf District. It opened in 1996.
