= U6 (Vienna U-Bahn) =

Metro line in Vienna

Line U6
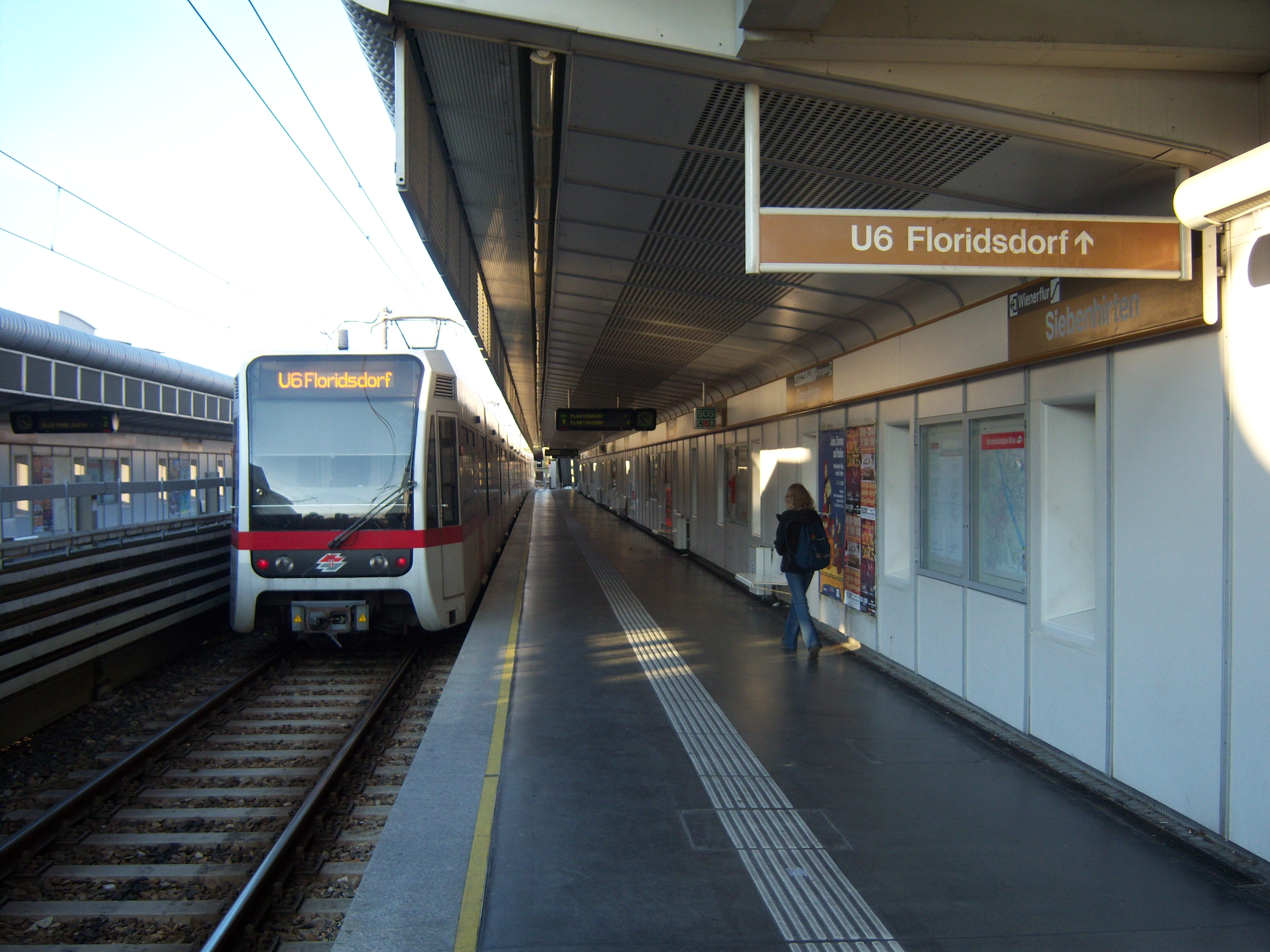
- Line U6 train at Siebenhirten

Overview
- Native name: U-Bahn-Linie U6
- Status: Operational
- Termini: Floridsdorf; Siebenhirten
- Stations: 24

Service
- Type: Light metro
- System: Vienna U-Bahn
- Operator(s): Wiener Linien
- Depot(s): Michelbeuern, Rößlergasse

History
- Opened: 7 October 1989; 36 years ago

Technical
- Line length: 17.3 km (10.7 mi)
- Track gauge: 1,435 mm (4 ft 8 1/2 in) standard gauge
- Electrification: 750 V DC overhead catenary

Line U6 is a metro line on the Vienna U-Bahn. It currently has 24 stations and runs 17.3 km from Floridsdorf to Siebenhirten. It is connected to U4 at Längenfeldgasse, U3 at Westbahnhof and U4 at Spittelau. The first section of the line opened in 1989, and was completed at its present length in 1996. It is the only metro line in the DACH countries which is not operated by third rail but by overhead wire; this is because the centre portion of the line is an elevated part of the former Vienna Stadtbahn system, which was operated by overhead wire.

When the line was transformed to rapid transit standards, it was considered too expensive to rebuild the elevated portion for high-floor trains and third rail, as it was done with the U4. As a result, the U6 currently uses low-floor T-Class vehicles, but the U6 is not the only rapid transit line that uses low-floor metro trains, with Line M1 of the Budapest Metro being another notable example.

== Stations ==
Line U6 currently serves the following stations:

- Floridsdorf (transfer to:)
- Neue Donau
- Handelskai (transfer to:)
- Dresdner Straße
- Jägerstraße
- Spittelau (transfer to: - P+R park & ride facility)
- Nußdorfer Straße
- Währinger Straße-Volksoper
- Michelbeuern-AKH
- Alser Straße
- Josefstädter Straße
- Thaliastraße
- Burggasse-Stadthalle
- Westbahnhof (transfer to:)
- Gumpendorfer Straße
- Längenfeldgasse (transfer to:)
- Niederhofstraße
- Bahnhof Meidling (transfer to:)
- Tscherttegasse
- Am Schöpfwerk
- Alterlaa
- Erlaaer Straße
- Perfektastraße ( P+R park & ride facility)
- Siebenhirten ( P+R park & ride facility)
