= Margaretengürtel station =

Vienna U-Bahn station

Margaretengürtel
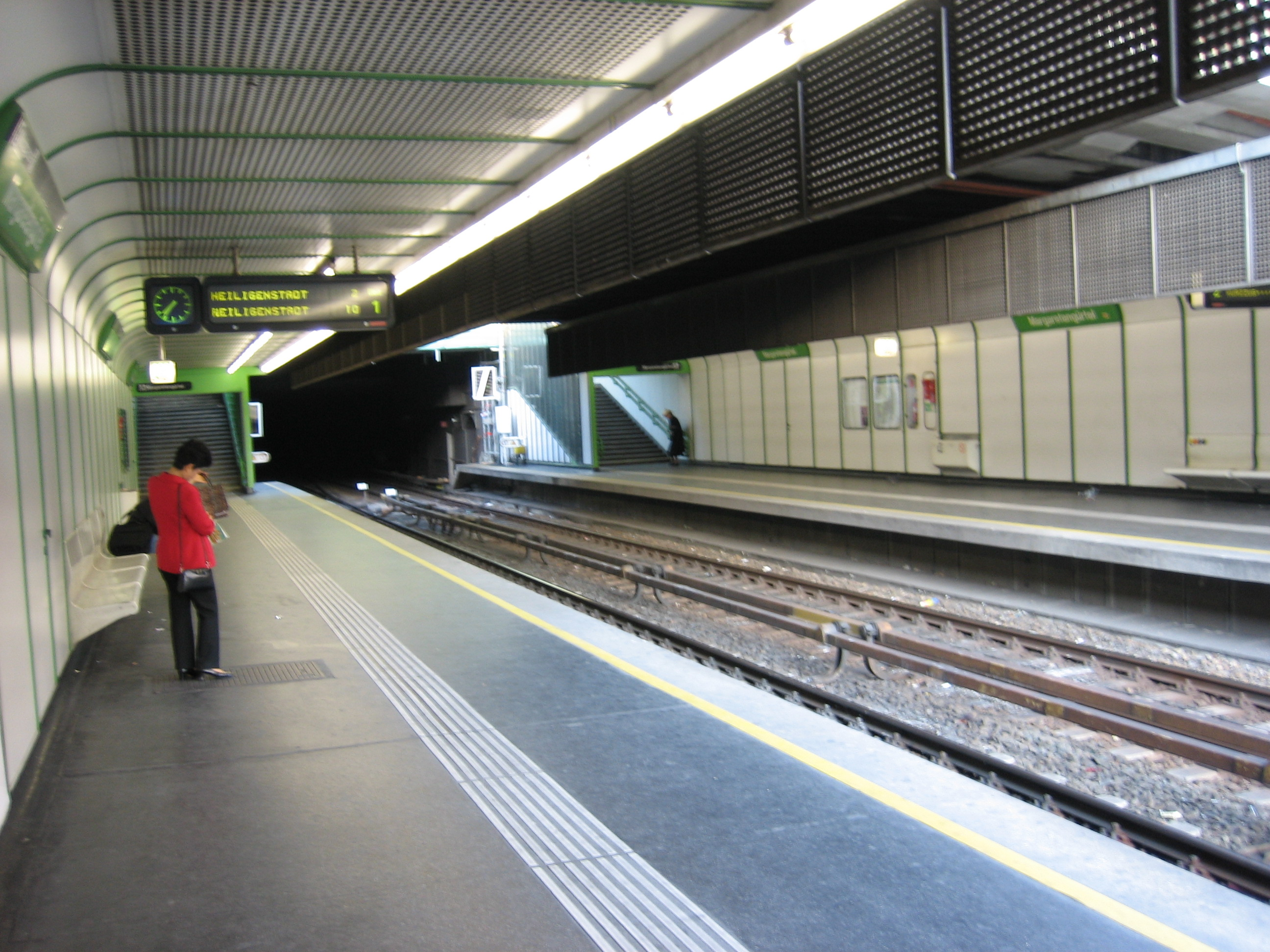

General information
- Location: Margareten, Vienna; Austria
- Coordinates: 48.1885°N 16.3431°E

History
- Opened: 1899

Services
Preceding station	Wiener Linien	Following station
Längenfeldgasse toward Hütteldorf	U4	Pilgramgasse toward Heiligenstadt
Location

Margaretengürtel is a station on U4 of the Vienna U-Bahn. It is located in the Margareten District. It opened as part of the Wiener Stadtbahn in 1899 and became an U-Bahn station in 1980.
