= Friedensbrücke station =

Vienna U-Bahn station

Friedensbrücke
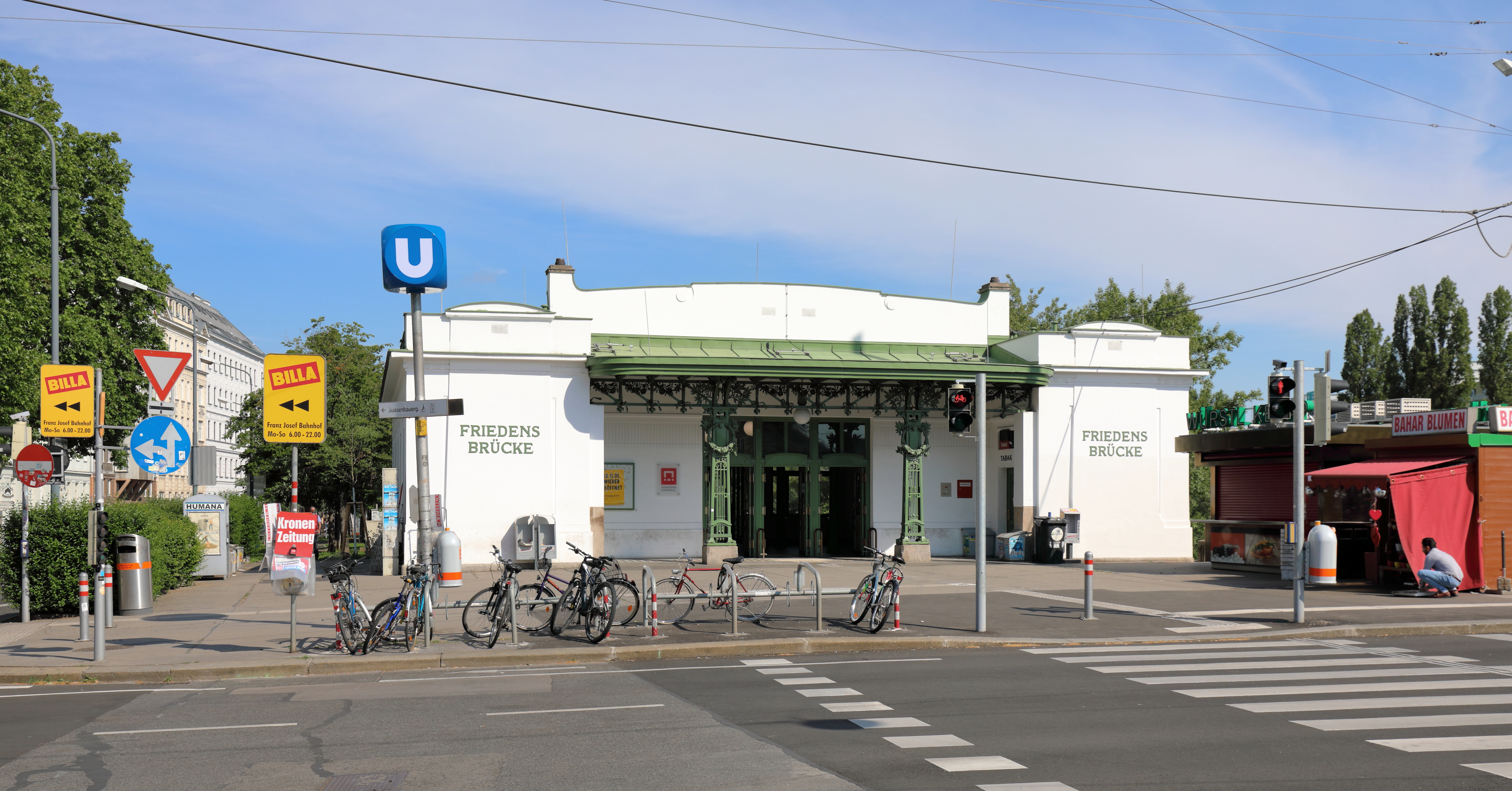

General information
- Location: Alsergrund, Vienna; Austria
- Coordinates: 48.2279°N 16.3639°E

History
- Opened: 8 May 1976

Services
Preceding station	Wiener Linien	Following station
Roßauer Lände toward Hütteldorf	U4	Spittelau toward Heiligenstadt
Location

Friedensbrücke is a station on U4 of the Vienna U-Bahn. It is in the Alsergrund District. It opened in 1976.
