= Bahnhof Meidling station =

Vienna U-Bahn station

Bahnhof Meidling
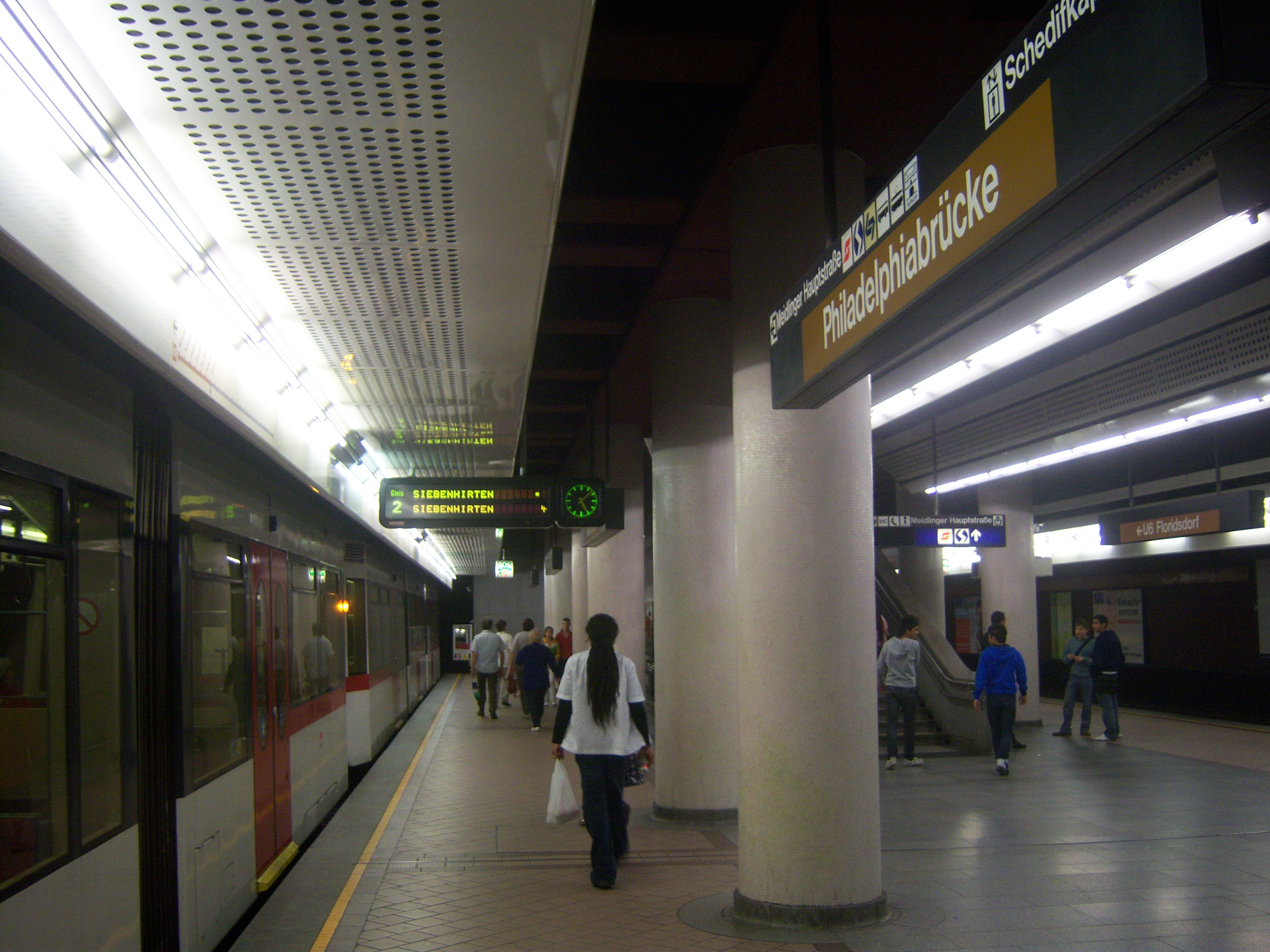

General information
- Location: Meidling, Vienna; Austria
- Coordinates: 48.1732°N 16.3313°E
- System: Vienna U-Bahn rapid transit station
- Lines: (Interchange)

History
- Opened: 7 October 1989

Services
Preceding station	Wiener Linien	Following station
Niederhofstraße toward Floridsdorf	U6	Tscherttegasse toward Siebenhirten
Location

Bahnhof Meidling is a station on U6 of the Vienna U-Bahn. Up until 4 October 2013 it was called Philadelphiabrücke.

Above the U-Bahn station is the Wien Meidling railway station, which is served by long distance and regional trains, and by Vienna S-Bahn lines S1, S2, S3, S60 and S80.

Both stations are located in the Meidling District. The U-Bahn station opened on 7 October 1989. On 15 April 1995 the line was extended further south to Siebenhirten.
