= Siebenhirten station =

Vienna U-Bahn station

Siebenhirten
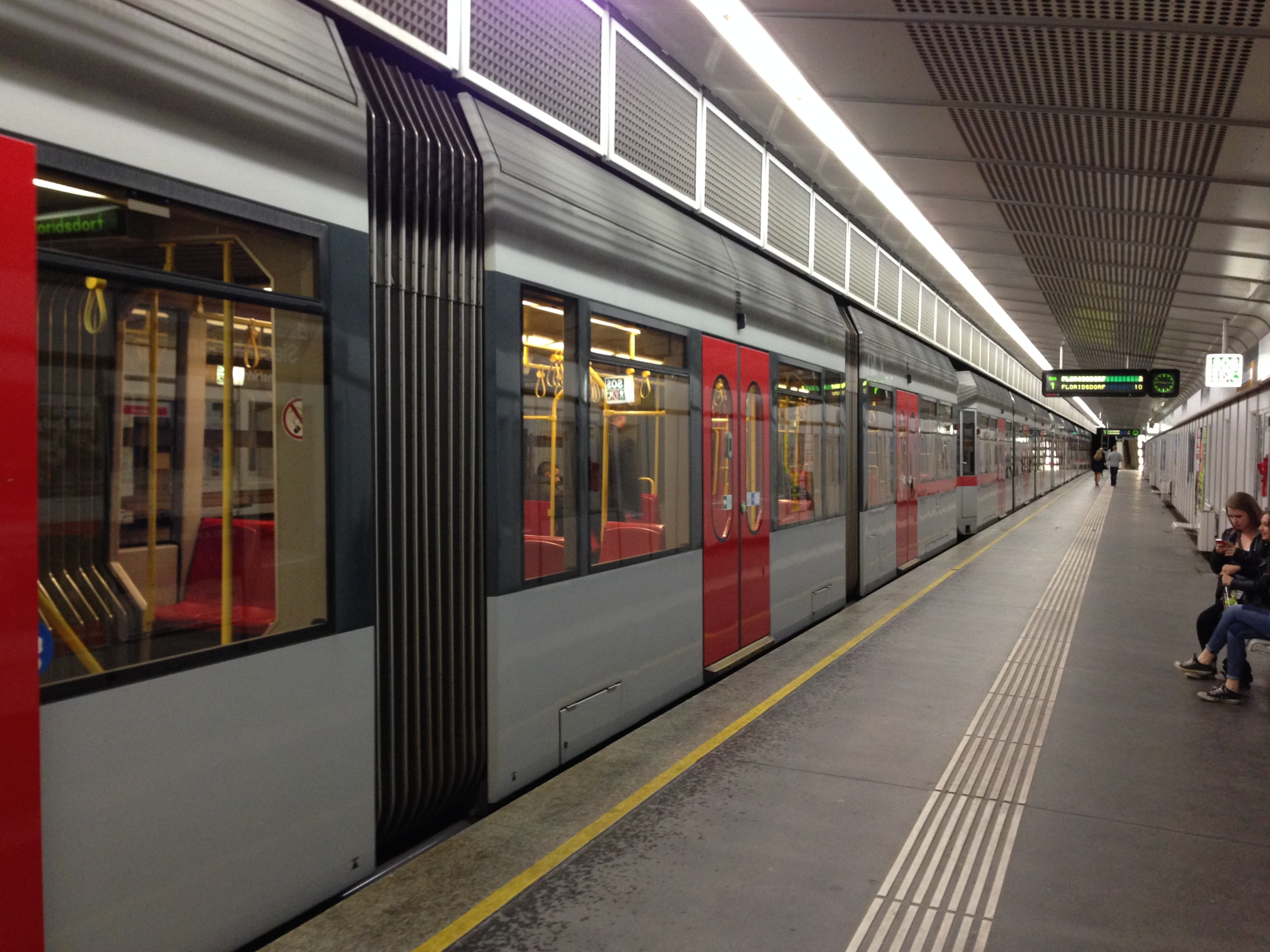

General information
- Location: Liesing, Vienna; Austria
- Coordinates: 48°7′49″N 16°18′35″E
- System: Vienna U-Bahn rapid transit station

History
- Opened: 1995

Services
Preceding station	Wiener Linien	Following station
Perfektastraße toward Floridsdorf	U6	Terminus
Location

Siebenhirten (German pronunciation: [ˌziːbm̩ˈhɪʁtn̩]) is a station on U6 of the Vienna U-Bahn. It is located in the Liesing District. It opened on 15 April 1995 as the southern terminus of the extension of the line from Philadelphiabrücke.
