= Floridsdorf station =

Vienna U-Bahn station

Floridsdorf
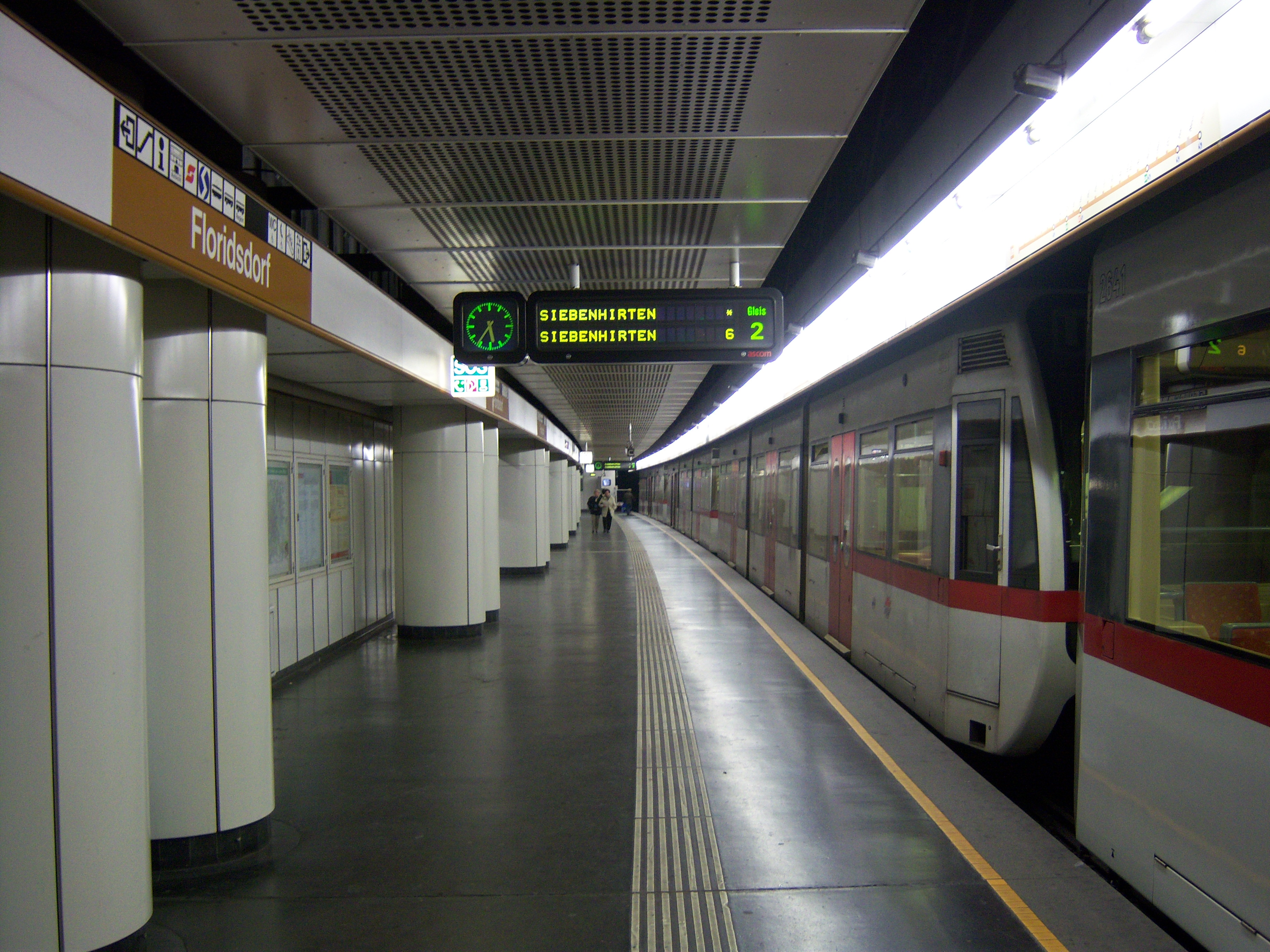

General information
- Location: Floridsdorf, Vienna; Austria
- Coordinates: 48.2561°N 16.3998°E
- Lines: (Interchange)

History
- Opened: 1996

Services
Preceding station	Wiener Linien	Following station
Terminus	U6	Neue Donau toward Siebenhirten
Location

Floridsdorf is a station on U6 of the Vienna U-Bahn. It is located in the Floridsdorf District, underneath Wien Floridsdorf railway station, which is also served by Vienna S-Bahn lines S1, S2, S3 and S7. It opened in 1996.
