= Karlsplatz Stadtbahn Station =

Former station of the Viennese Stadtbahn

Coordinates: 48°12′01″N 16°22′13″E

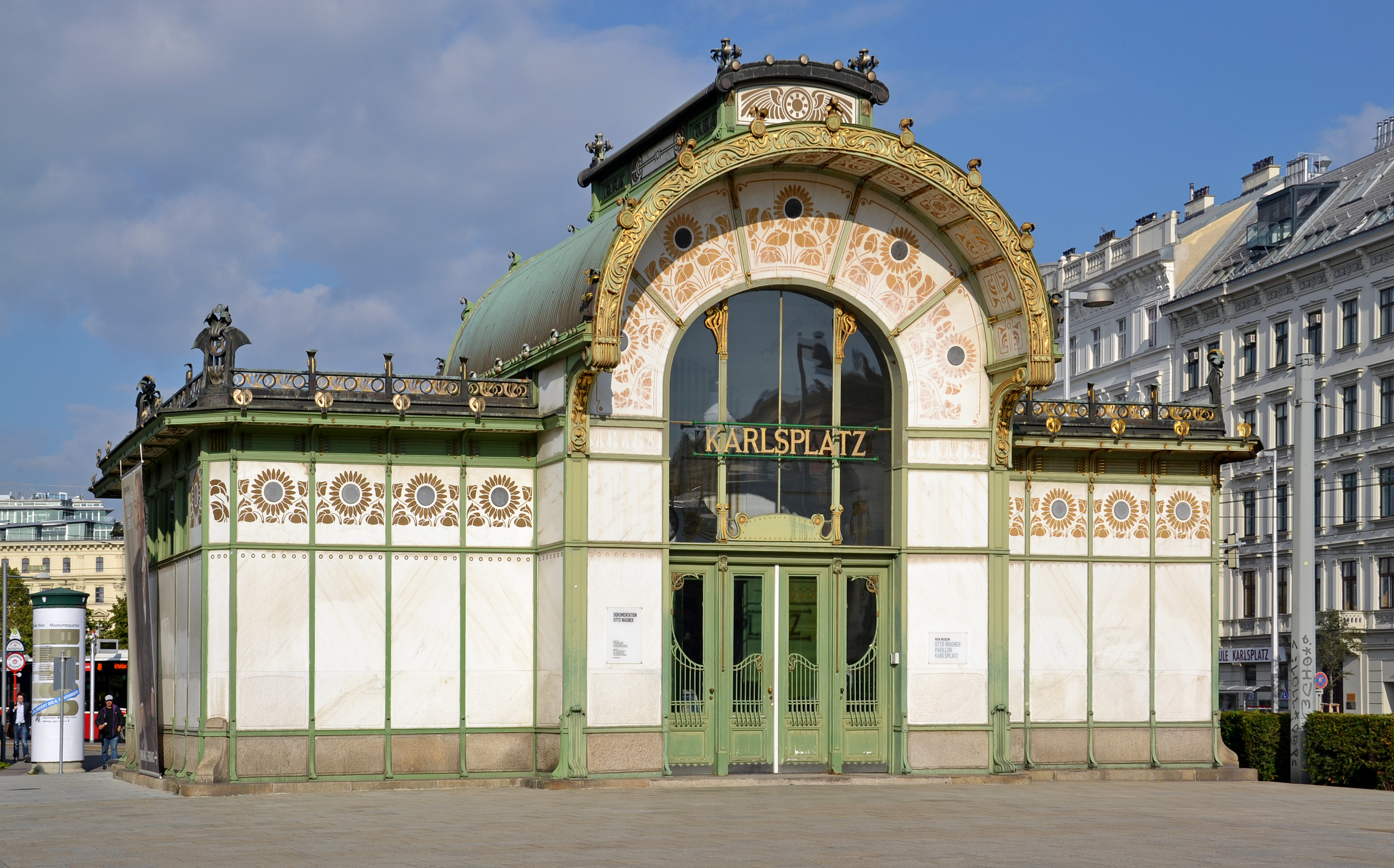
Karlsplatz Stadtbahn Station in Vienna, Austria

Karlsplatz Stadtbahn Station is a former station of the Viennese Stadtbahn. The buildings above ground on Karlsplatz are a well-known example of Jugendstil architecture. These buildings were included in The Vienna Secession, as they followed many of the artistic styles of that movement. They were designed by Otto Wagner, adviser to the Transport Commission in Vienna, and Joseph Maria Olbrich and are, unlike the other Stadtbahn stations, made of a steel framework with marble slabs mounted on the exterior. These stations allowed Otto Wagner to achieve his goal of creating two modern axes of architecture in a city that was becoming one of the most modern cities of its time. These buildings went on to become the most modern monument of the modern city. Architectural critic and poet Friedrich Achleitner commented on the Stadtbahn stations as follows "...In these two station buildings Wagner reached a highpoint of his dialectic (in his planning of the Stadtbahn) between function and poetry, construction and decoration, whereby a severe rationalism engages in competition with an almost Secessionist kind of decoration."

The station was opened as Academiestraße in 1899. When the Stadtbahn line was converted to U-Bahn in 1981, the original station was scheduled to be demolished. As a result of public outcry, it was decided to keep the station buildings. Both buildings were disassembled, renovated, and then reassembled two metres (6 ft 7 in) higher than their original location after completion of U-Bahn construction. One of the buildings is now used as an exhibition space by the Vienna Museum, with an U-Bahn entrance in its rear; the other is used as a café.
