= Vienna U-Bahn =

Subway transport in Vienna, Austria

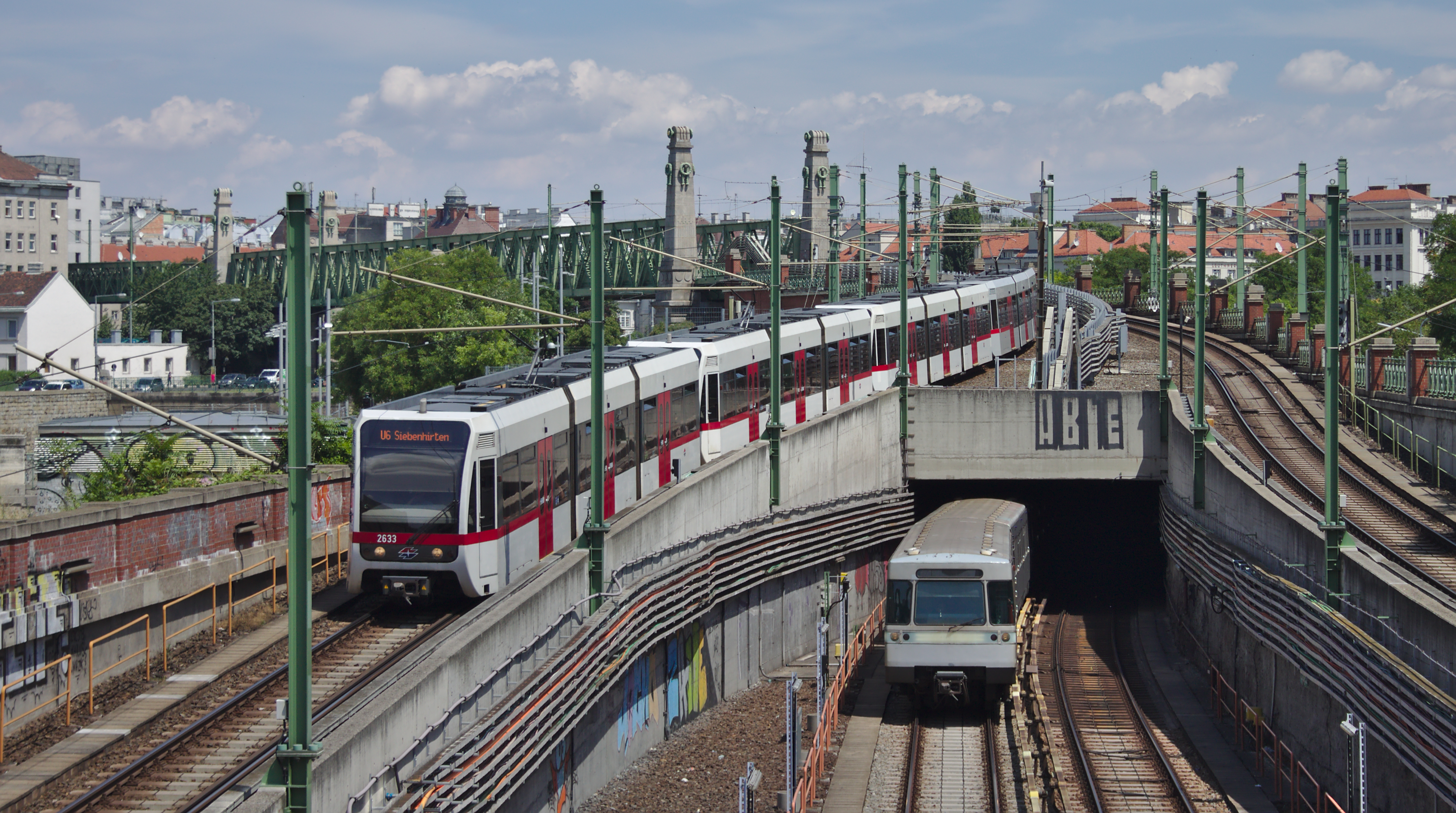
- Train sets of lines U6 and U4 entering Längenfeldgasse interchange

Overview
- Native name: U-Bahn Wien
- Locale: Vienna, Austria
- Transit type: Rapid transit
- Line number: (future)
- Number of stations: 109
- Annual ridership: ▲404.8 million (2023)
- Website: Wiener Linien

Operation
- Began operation: 8 May 1976 (test operation); 25 February 1978; 48 years ago (official opening)
- Operator: Wiener Linien
- Number of vehicles: 778
- Headway: 2–15 minutes

Technical
- System length: 83.9 km (52 mi 11 ch)
- Track gauge: 1,435 mm (4 ft 8 1/2 in)
- Electrification: 750 V DC third rail (U1–U4); 750 V DC overhead lines (U6)
- Average speed: 32.5 km/h (20.2 mph)
- Top speed: 85 km/h (53 mph)

The Vienna U-Bahn (German: U-Bahn Wien) is a rapid transit system serving Vienna, Austria. The five-line network consists of 83.1 kilometers (51.6 mi) of route, serving 109 stations. 459.8 million passengers rode the U-Bahn in 2019.

The modern-day U-Bahn opened on 25 February 1978, after test operations that began on 8 May 1976. Parts of two of the lines, designated U4 and U6, date back to the Stadtbahn ("city railway") system, which opened in 1898. Parts of the U2 and U6 lines began as subway tunnels built to accommodate earlier tram lines. Only the U1 and U3 were built wholly as new subway lines.

Lines are designated by a number and the prefix "U" (for U-Bahn) and identified on station signage and related literature by a colour. There are five lines; U1, U2, U3, U4 and U6. Since the late 1960s there have been numerous suggestions of routings for a line U5, but all these projects had been shelved until the construction of a new U5 was announced in early 2014. Stations are often named after streets, public spaces, or districts, and in some special cases after prominent buildings at or near the station. The policy of the Wiener Linien, however, states that they prefer not to name stations after buildings.

Ticketing for the network is integrated under the Verkehrsverbund Ost-Region (VOR) along with other means of public transport in Vienna, including trams and buses. Local tickets are valid on S-Bahn suburban rail services and other train services but those are operated by the state railway operator, ÖBB. Tickets are not valid on bus services operated by Vienna Airport Lines or the City Airport Train express train.

System map including Vienna S-Bahn and Badner Bahn

== U-Bahn network ==
With the September 2017 opening of the 4.6-kilometer (2.9 mi), five-station extension of the U1 line, the five-line U-Bahn network consists of 83.1 kilometers (51.6 mi) of route, serving 109 stations. Further extensions of the Vienna U-Bahn are scheduled to be completed in 2026-2032, finally creating the missing line U5. Upon completion of the U5 and U2 projects, there will then be a network that is 90 kilometers (56 mi) long with 116 stations. Some plans have been proposed for the system beyond 2032, when the U2/U5 project is completed, although such plans are currently unfunded.

U-Bahn services run between 05:00 and around 01:00 at intervals between two and five minutes during the day and up to eight minutes after 20:00. Since 4 September 2010, there has been 24-hour service operating at 15-minute intervals on Friday and Saturday evenings, and on evenings prior to a public holiday. The 24-hour U-Bahn is supplemented on these nights by the Vienna NightLine bus service.

Line	Colour	Route	Length	Stations
U1 (Vienna U-Bahn)	Red	Oberlaa – Leopoldau	19.2 km (11.9 mi)	24
U2 (Vienna U-Bahn)	Purple	Karlsplatz – Seestadt	17.2 km (10.4 mi)	21
U3 (Vienna U-Bahn)	Orange	Ottakring – Simmering	13.5 km (8.4 mi)	21
U4 (Vienna U-Bahn)	Green	Hütteldorf – Heiligenstadt	16.5 km (10.3 mi)	20
U6 (Vienna U-Bahn)	Brown	Siebenhirten – Floridsdorf	17.4 km (10.8 mi)	24

=== Stations ===
Vienna U-Bahn stations
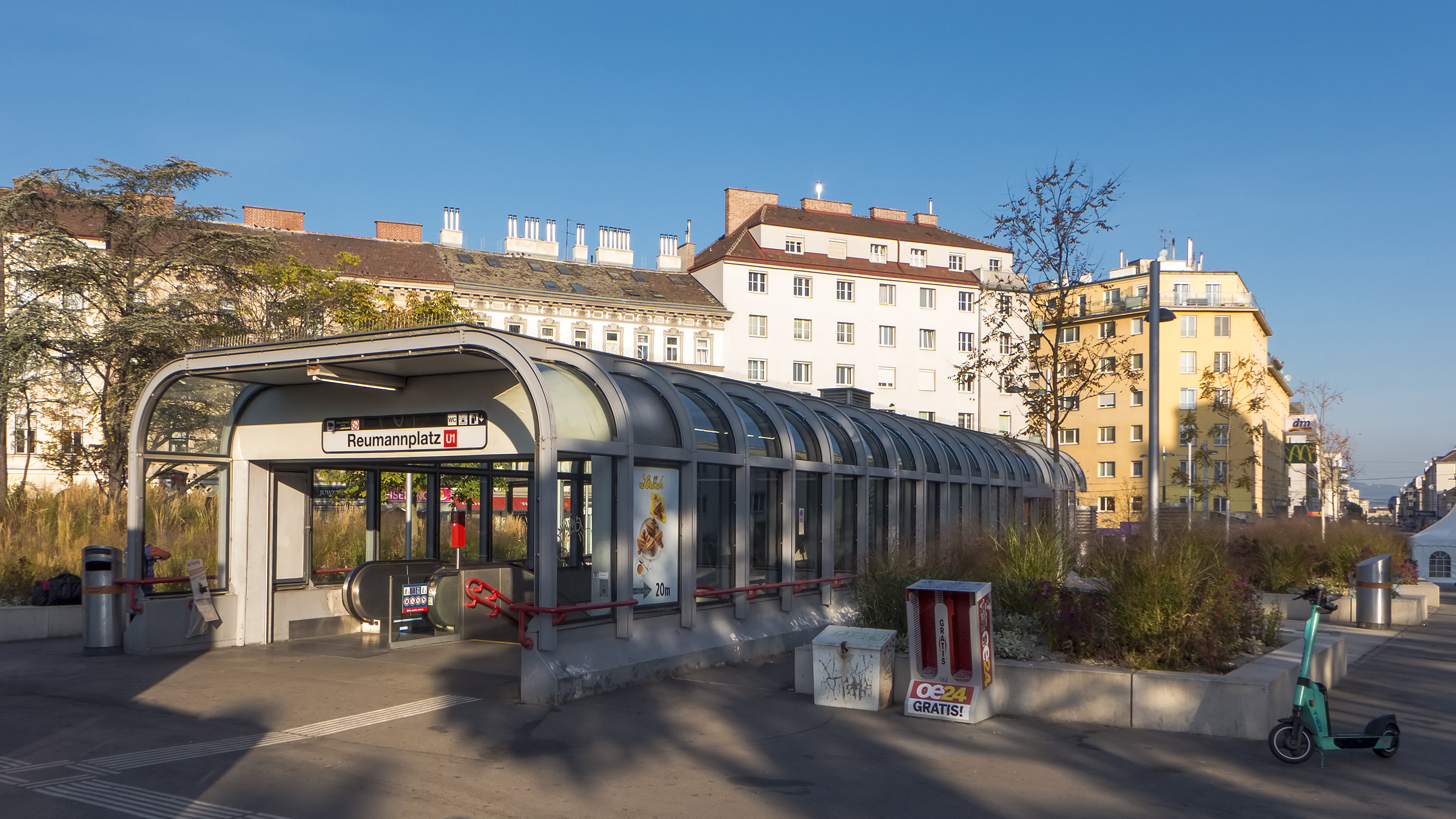
Reumannplatz station

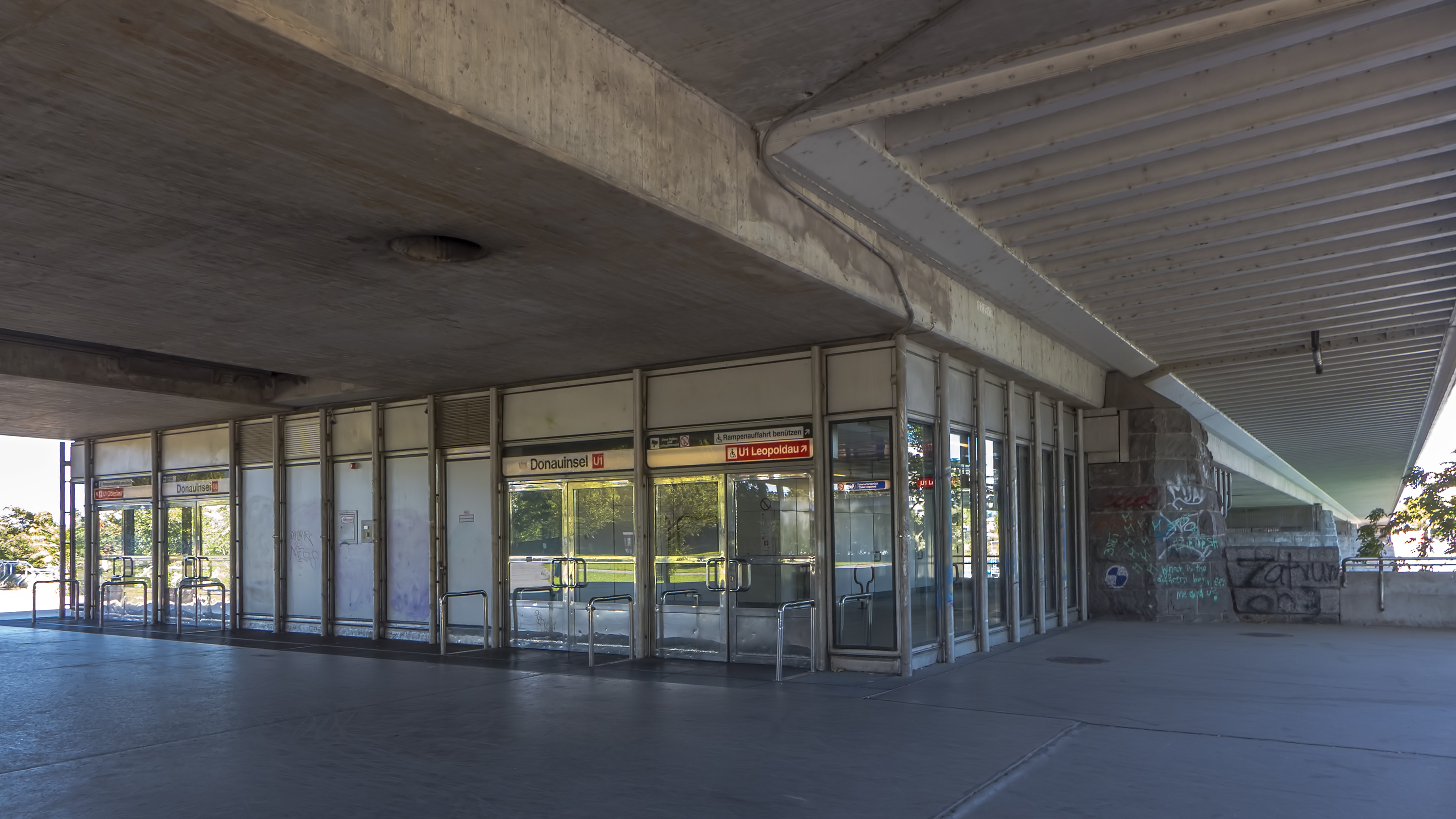
Donauinsel station entrance

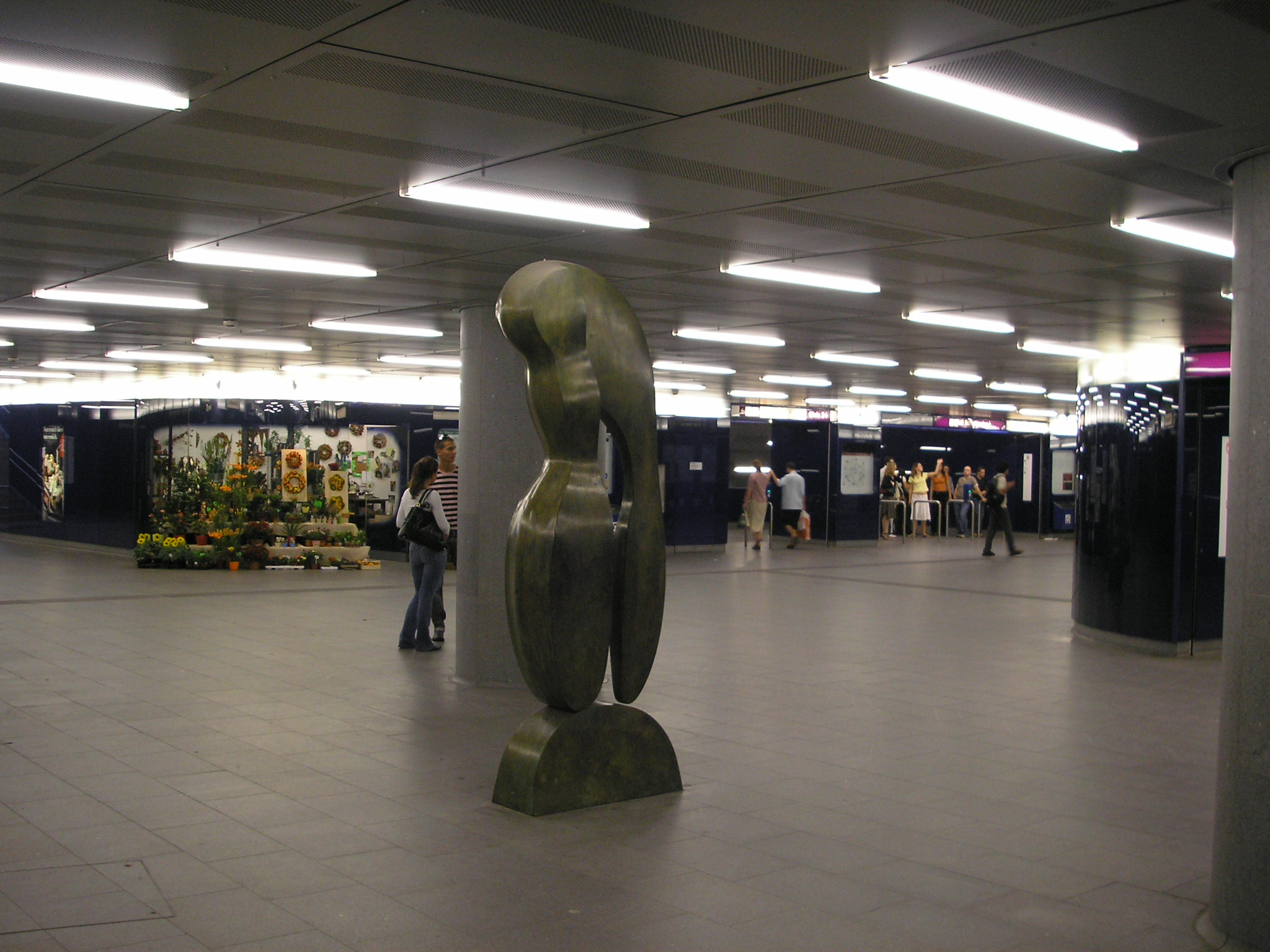
Museumsquartier station sculpture

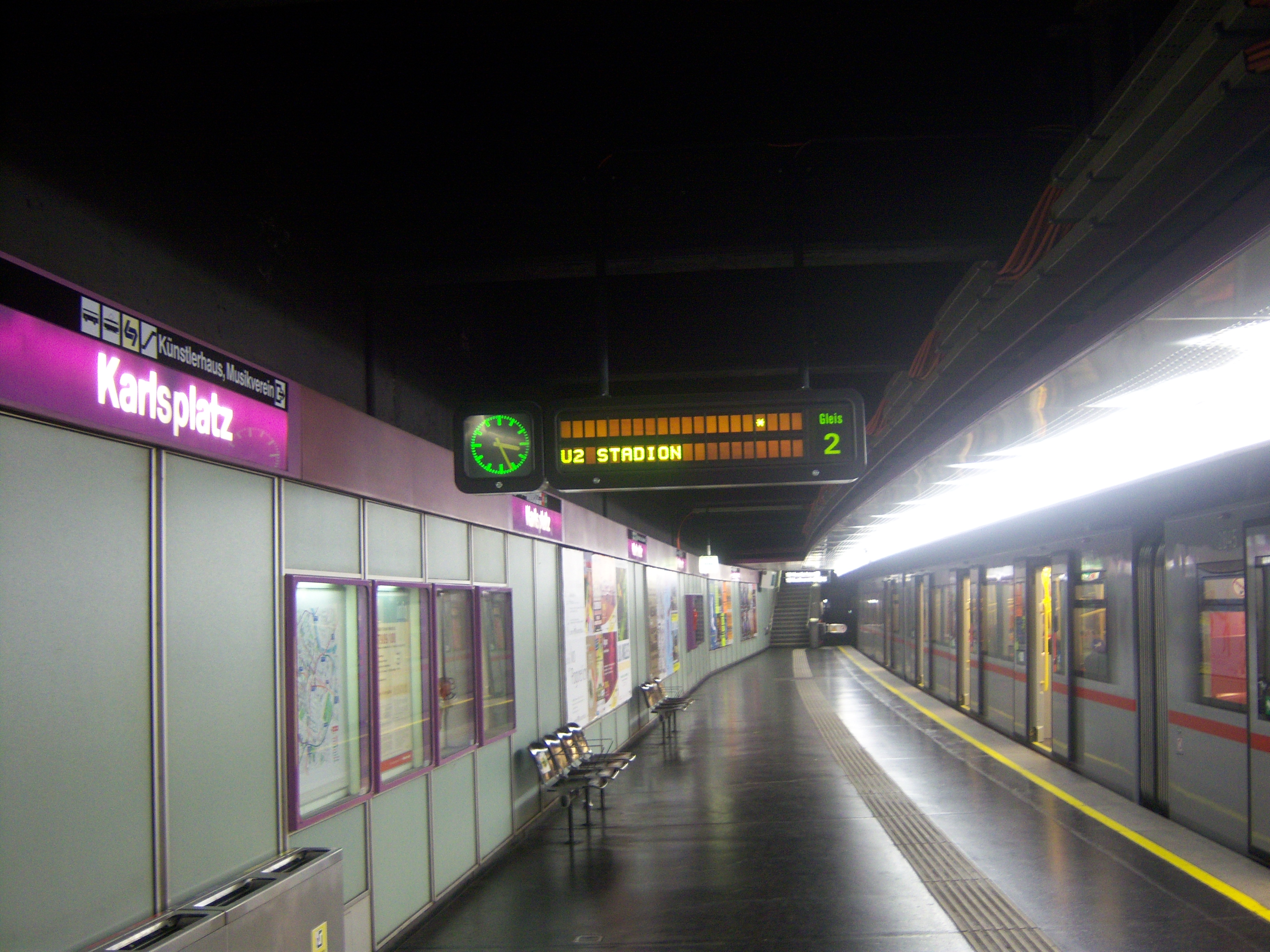
U2 platform at Karlsplatz station

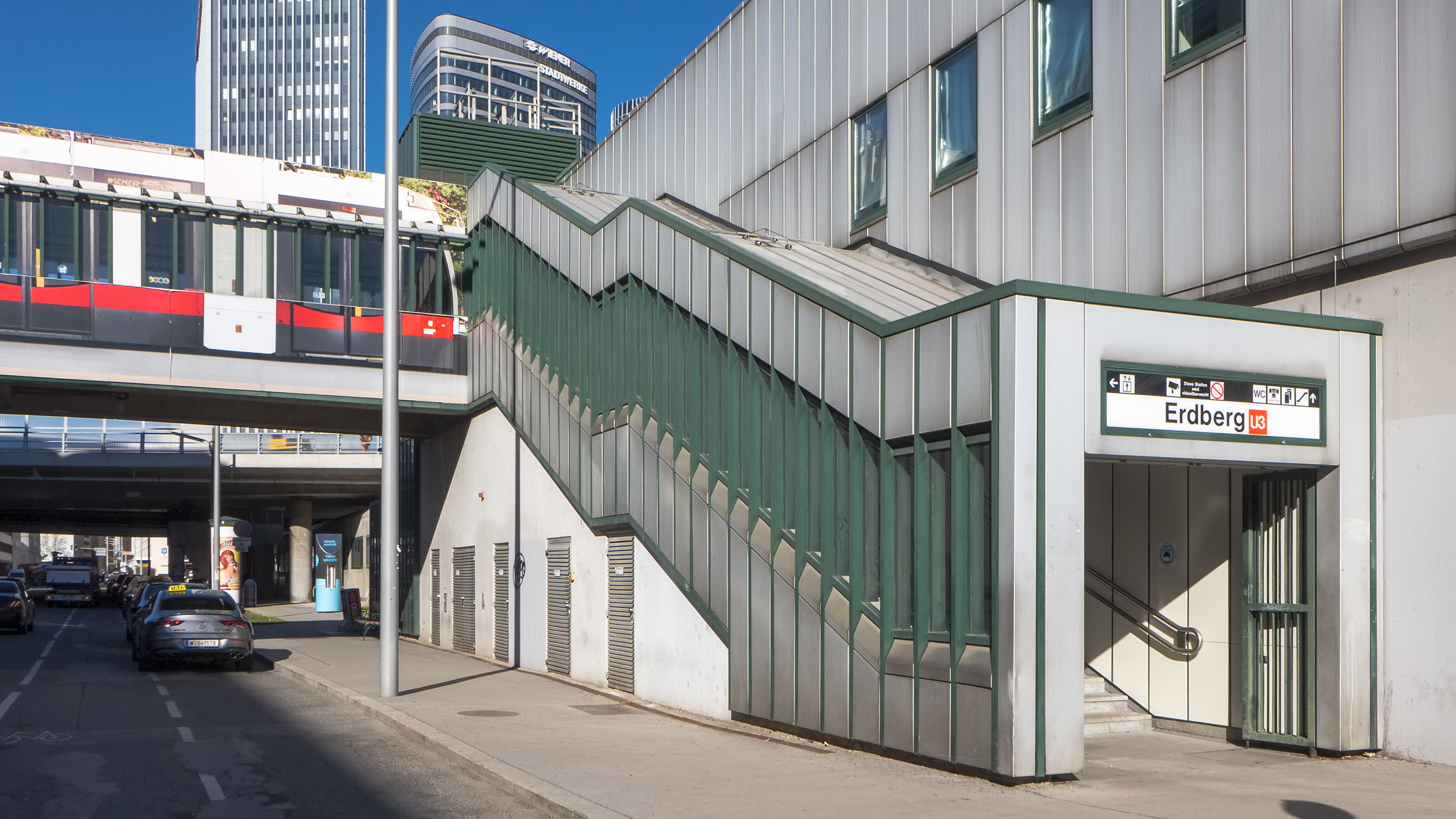
Erdberg station

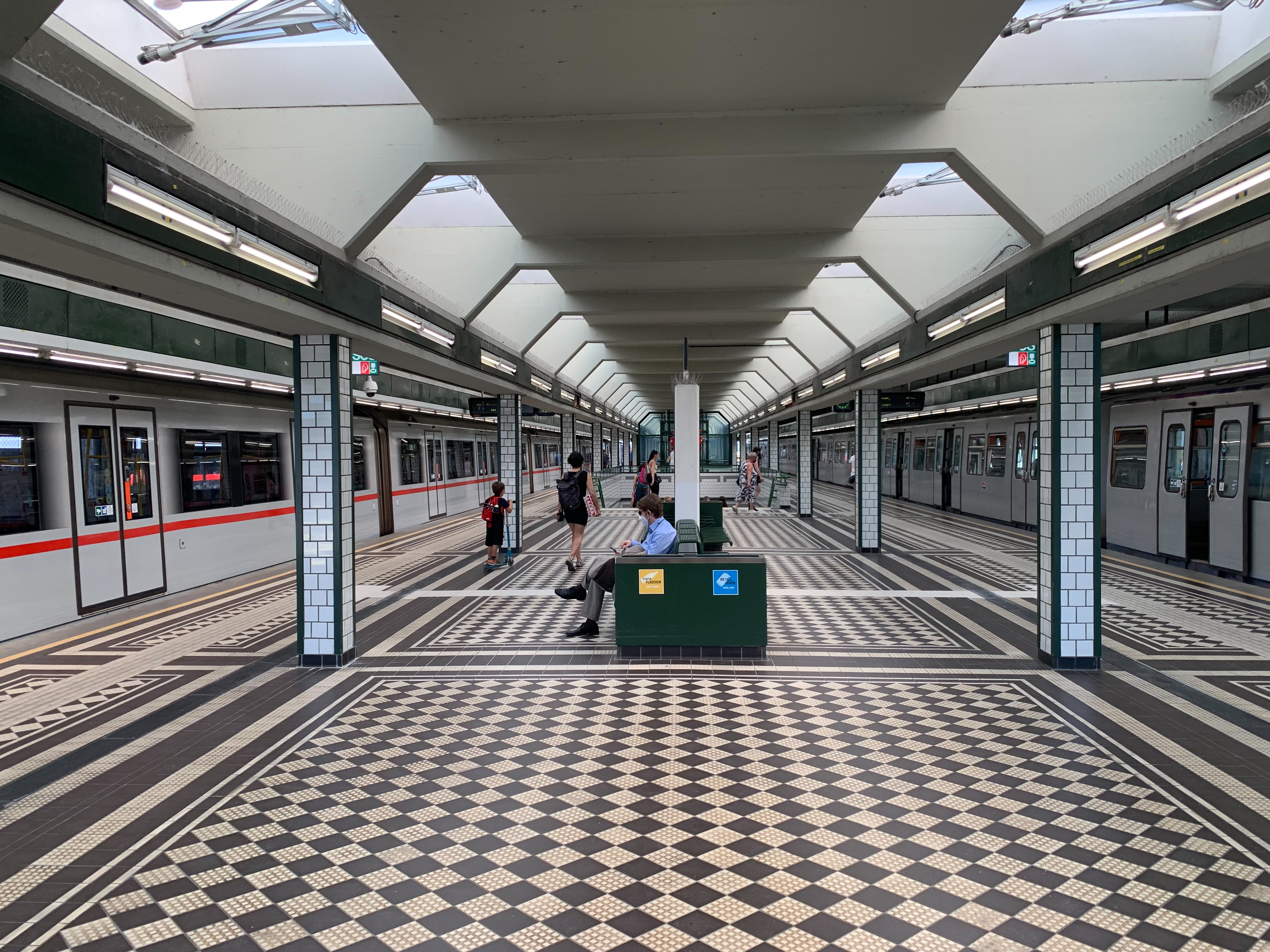
Platform 4 of Hütteldorf station

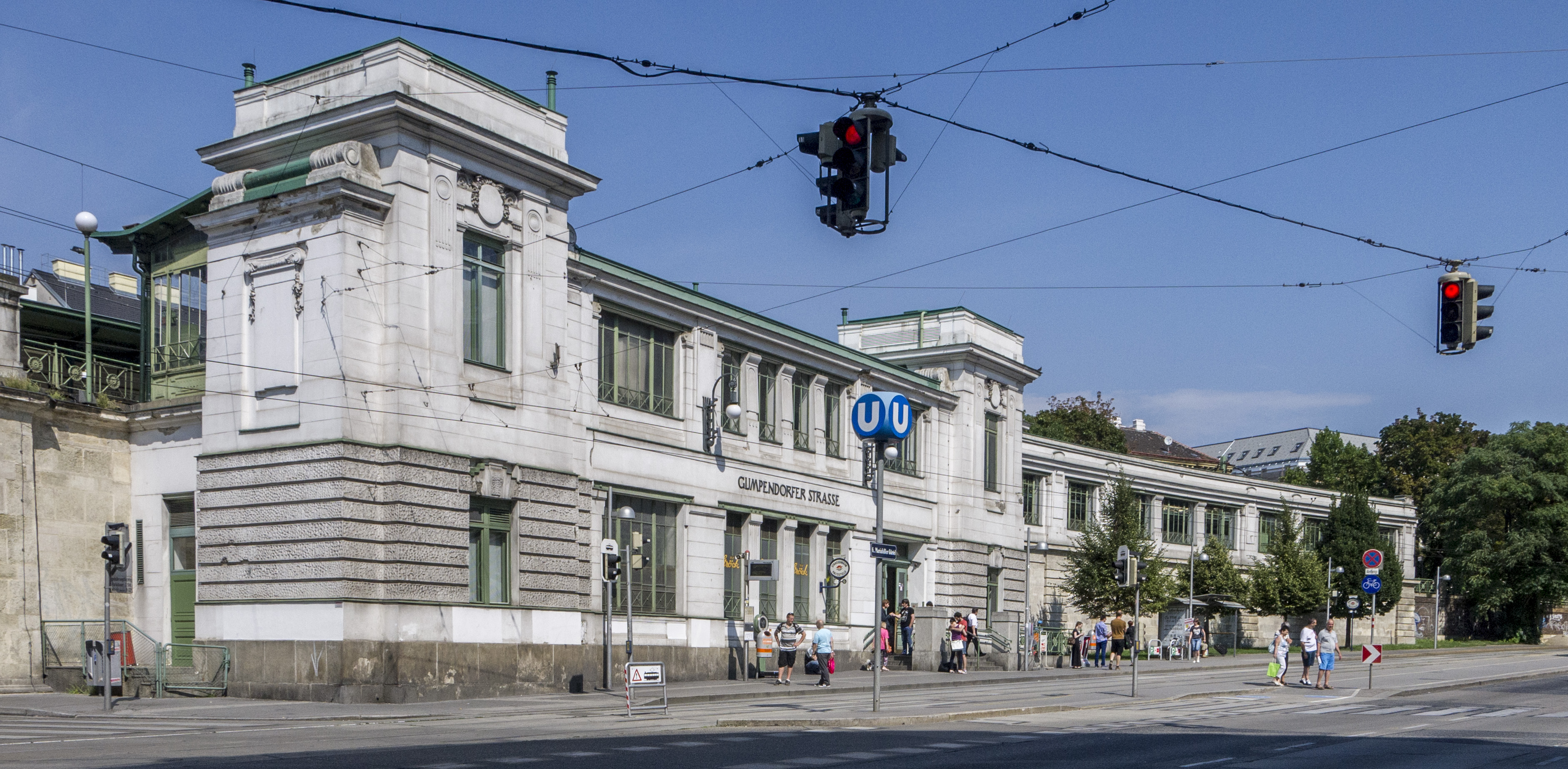
Gumpendorfer Straße station by Otto Wagner (2007)

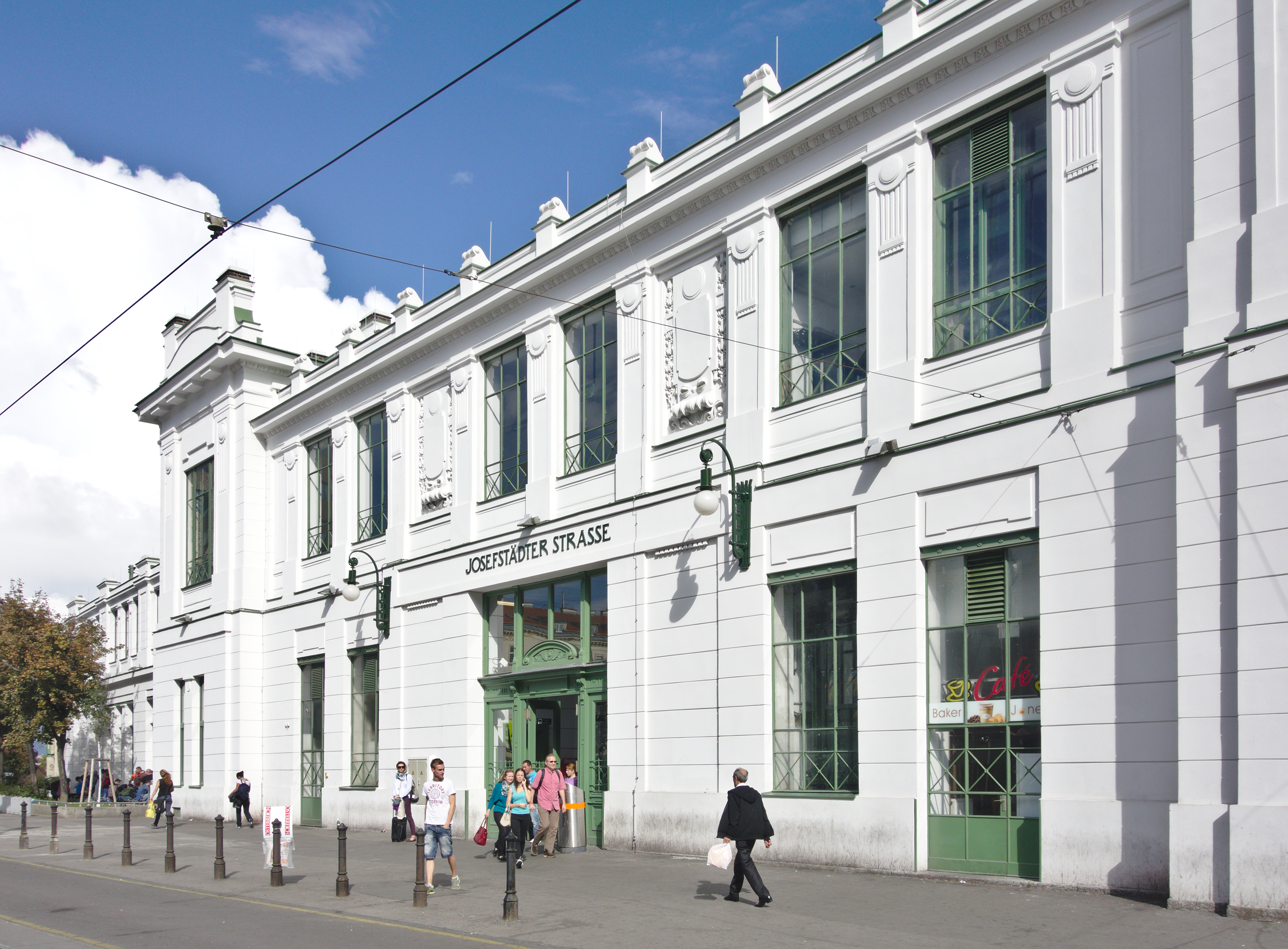
Josefstädter Straße station (by Otto Wagner)

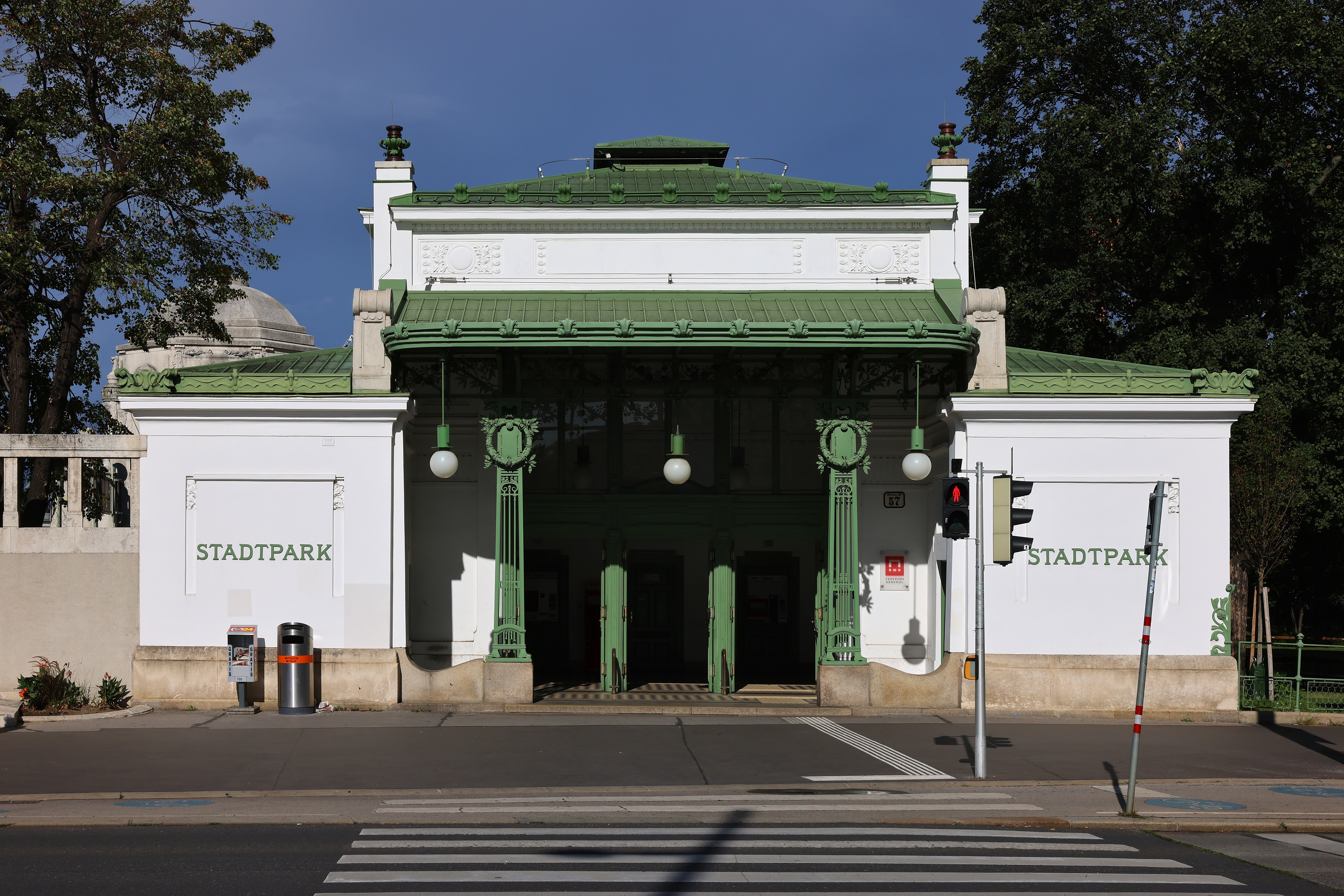
Stadtpark station entrance by Otto Wagner

=== Metropolitan railway and underground trams ===
The stretch between Heiligenstadt and Hütteldorf, covering modern day U4, used to be part of the metropolitan railway (Stadtbahn). The stretch between Längenfeldgasse and Spittelau, covering most of U6, also used to be a part, although Spittelau wasn't a station yet. The stretch between Karlsplatz and Schottenring (covering some of U2, and in the future some of it will cover a section of U5) was part of an underground tram network (U-Straßenbahn).

== History and projected expansions ==
Planning for an underground railway in Vienna can be traced back to the 1840s. Since then, there have been numerous plans and concessions to build such a project, making Vienna the city with the most subway planning.

The concession request of the engineer Heinrich Sichrowsky dates from 1844 with the idea of a pneumatic, or atmospheric, railway based on the system of Medhurst and Clegg. The trains would have been advanced pneumatically by stationary steam engine air pumps. Sichrowsky’s route would have led from Lobkowitzplatz, below the Vienna Glacis, and along the Wien River to Hütteldorf. Although such trains had been built in London and Paris, it found in Vienna no investors for its stock company, so this idea was rejected. The connecting railway project of Julius Pollak (1849) was also conceived as an atmospheric system. Sichrowsky's request was the starting point for a series of plans that were mostly not approved and could not be implemented. For example, in 1858 the city planner Ludwig Zettl proposed to make an overburden of the former moat instead of filling it, and then to set up a railroad tram in this enclosed ditch, which would bypass the city. This would have created a connection between the central station and the market halls, while at the same time the gas-lit tunnels were to serve as warehouses for food. By 1873, at least 25 plans for a municipal railway system came up, with only the Verbindungsbahn, which already appeared in the much larger overall plan by Carl Ritter von Ghega in his project for Vienna's urban expansion of 1858, being later implemented as part of the mainline railway line. Ghega had already worked out a belt railway project along the line wall in 1845. The first planning for a subway in deep-seated tunnels by Emil Winkler dates back to 1873, with planning proposals that were also based on the first systematic traffic census in Vienna.

Another wave of public transport projects were developed as the ring road was close to be finished. The conception of the British engineers James Bunton and Joseph Fogerty won out, since their plans, approved in 1881, included trains to be run in tunnels, in open incisions, and on elevated tracks.

In 1883, the project of an "electric secondary railway" of the company Siemens & Halske planned for a small profile rail system with three lines. The construction failed due to the concern of the city council that inner city business life could be affected, especially since the project for the first time ever included a tunneling of the city center.

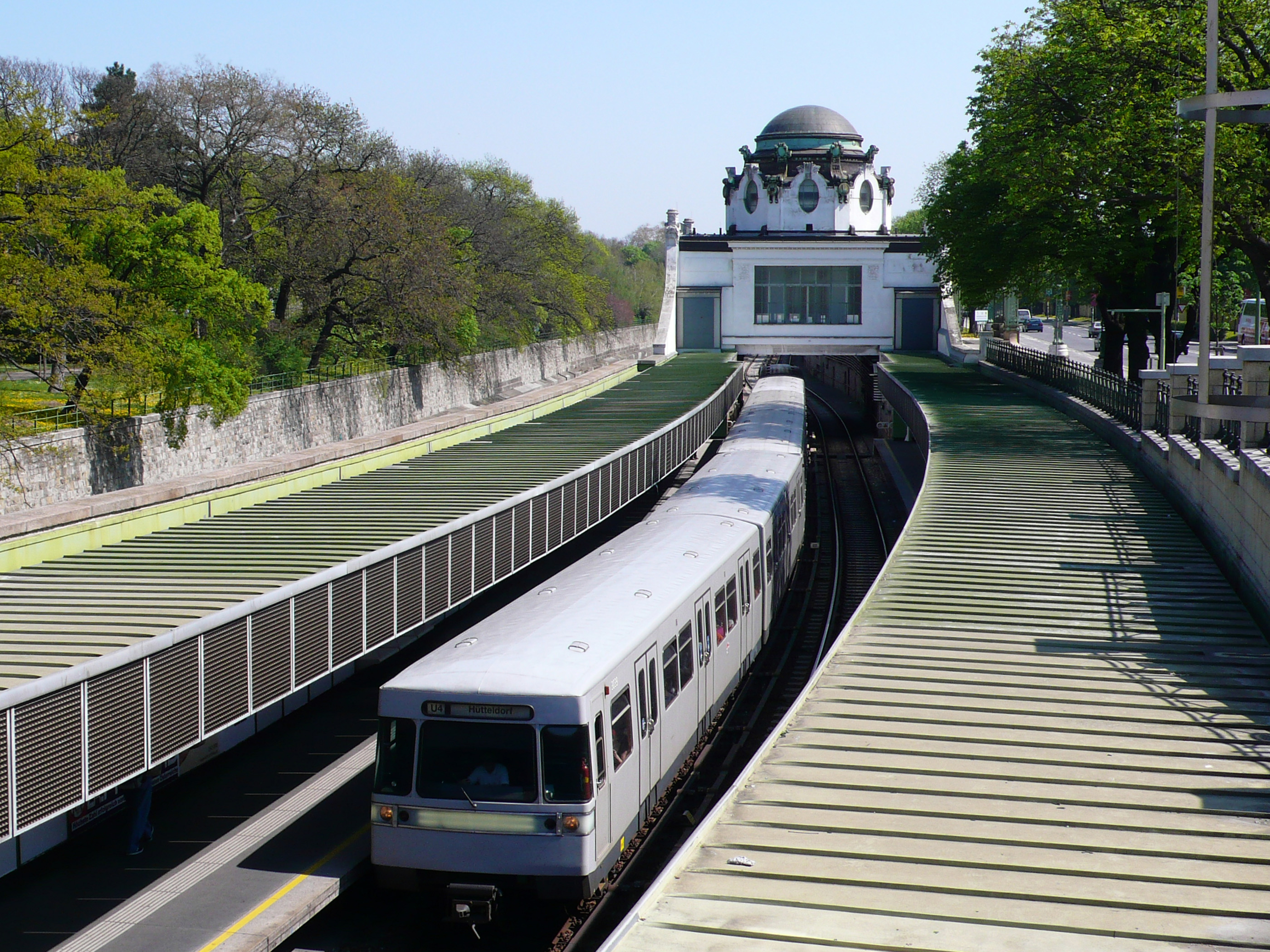
U4 train of the Vienna U-Bahn running on track of the former Stadtbahn; Hofpavillon Hietzing station designed for the Imperial family in 1899 by Otto Wagner

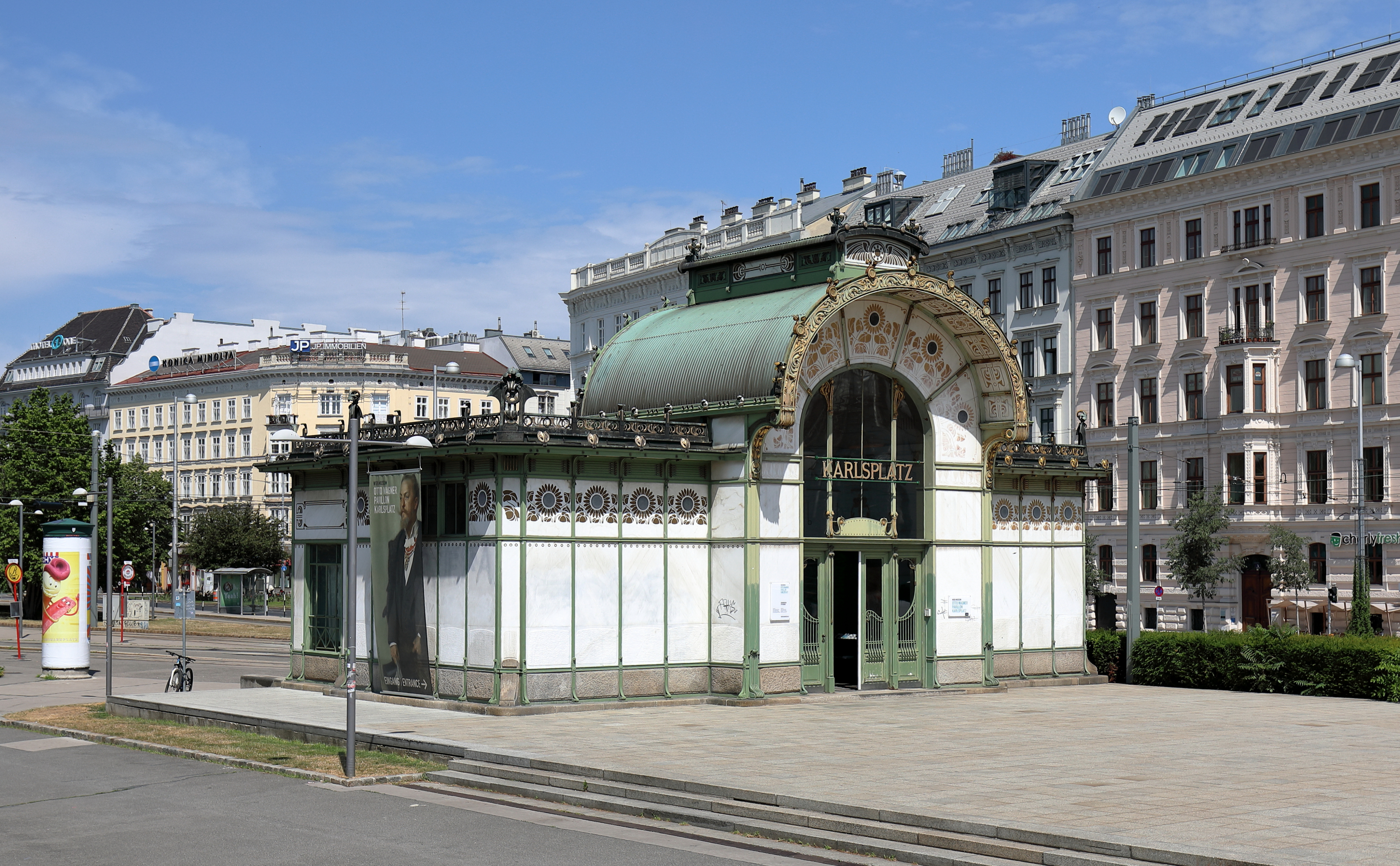
Pavilion formerly used as entrance to Karlsplatz Stadtbahn Station, in Jugendstil style by Otto Wagner

The first system to be constructed was a four-line Stadtbahn railway network (which had been planned to have three main and three local lines) using steam trains. Ground was broken in 1892, and the system was opened in stages between 11 May 1898 and 6 August 1901. At Hütteldorf, the Stadtbahn connected to railway service to the west, and at Heiligenstadt, to railway service on the Franz Josef Line, which then ran northwestwards within the Austro-Hungarian Empire to Eger. Some of the Jugendstil stations for this system designed by Otto Wagner are still in use. However, the Stadtbahn proved inadequate for mass transport, less successful than the tramway. Starting in 1910, plans were considered for an underground system, but were interrupted by the First World War, which also necessitated closing the Stadtbahn to civilian use. After the war, the economic situation of a smaller and poorer country ruled out continuing with the plan. However, starting on 26 May 1924 the Stadtbahn was electrified, something that many had called for before the war, and from autumn 1925 it was integrated with the tramway rather than the railways. The frequency of trains tripled. Plans for a U-Bahn dating to 1912–14 were revived and discussions took place in 1929, but the Great Depression again necessitated abandoning planning.

Both in 1937 and after the Anschluß, when Vienna became the largest city by surface area in Nazi Germany, ambitious plans for a U-Bahn, and a new central railway station, were discussed. Test tunnelling took place, but these plans, too, had to be shelved when the Second World War broke out.

Severe war damage caused the Stadtbahn system to be suspended in some areas until 27 May 1945. The redevelopment of stations took until the 1950s. Meanwhile, Vienna was occupied by the four allied powers until 1955, and in 1946 had returned three quarters of the pre-war expanded Greater Vienna to the state of Lower Austria. Two proposals for U-Bahn systems were nonetheless presented, in 1953 and 1954. Increasing car traffic led to cutbacks in the S-Bahn network that were partially made up for by buses. The U-Bahn issue was also politicised: in the 1954 and 1959 city council elections, the conservative Austrian People's Party championed construction of a U-Bahn, but the more powerful Social Democratic Party of Austria campaigned for putting housing first. The city council repeatedly rejected the U-Bahn idea in the late 1950s and early 1960s.

Extensions of the Stadtbahn system had always been discussed as an alternative to building a new U-Bahn. But it was not until the late 1960s, when the Stadtbahn and the Schnellbahn were no longer able to adequately serve the ever-increasing public traffic, that the decision to build a new network was taken. On 26 January 1968, the city council voted to begin construction of a 30 km (19 mi) basic network (Grundnetz). Construction began on 3 November 1969 on and under Karlsplatz, where three lines of the basic network were to meet, and where central control of the U-Bahn was located. Test operation began on 8 May 1976 on line U4, and the first newly constructed (underground) stretch of line opened on 25 February 1978 (five stations on U1 between Reumannplatz and Karlsplatz).

The construction of the Vienna U-Bahn network can be divided into several stages:

=== Initial construction (1969–1982): Basic network (Grundnetz) ===
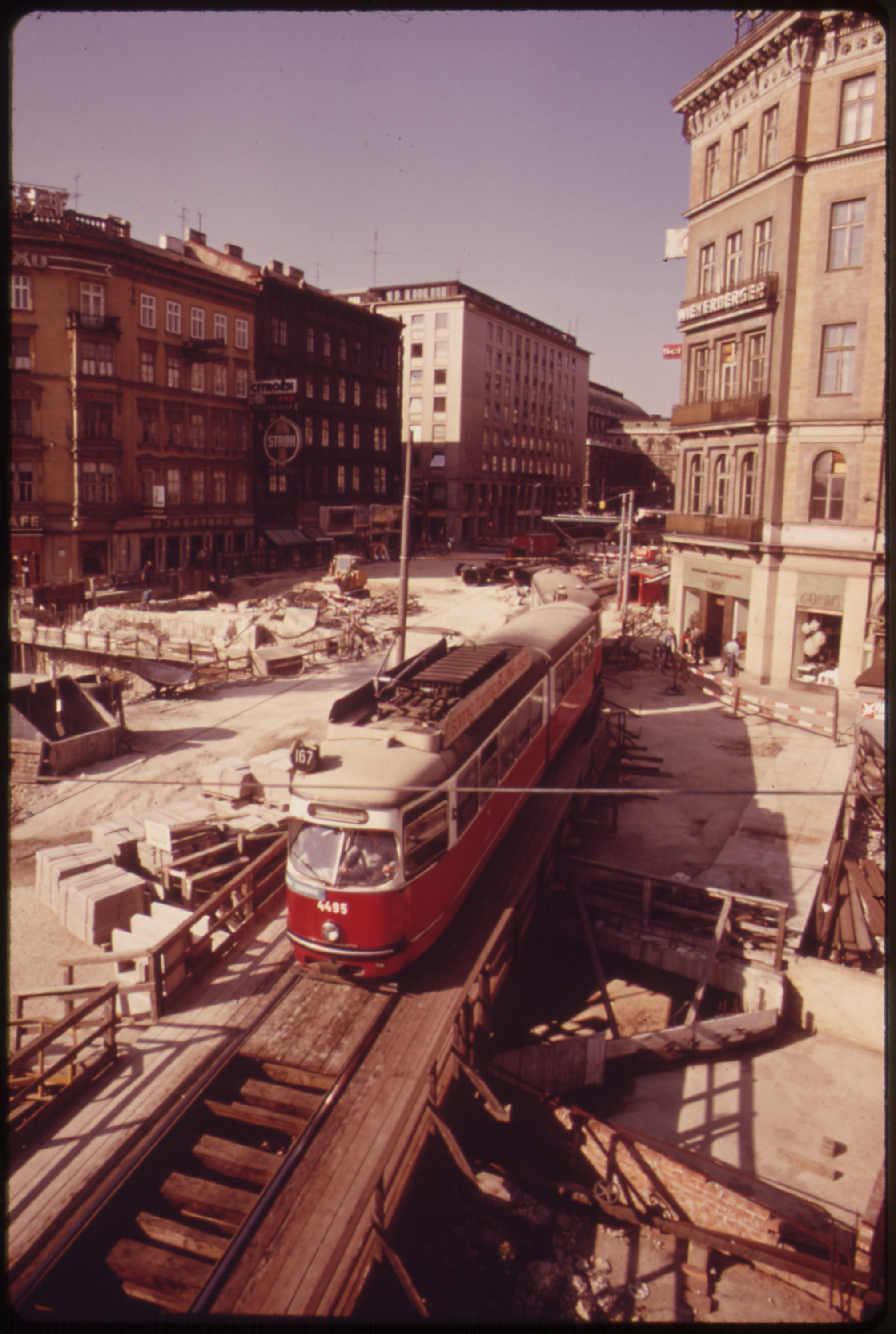
U-Bahn construction at Karlsplatz and Kärntner Straße, 1973; tram running on temporary trestle

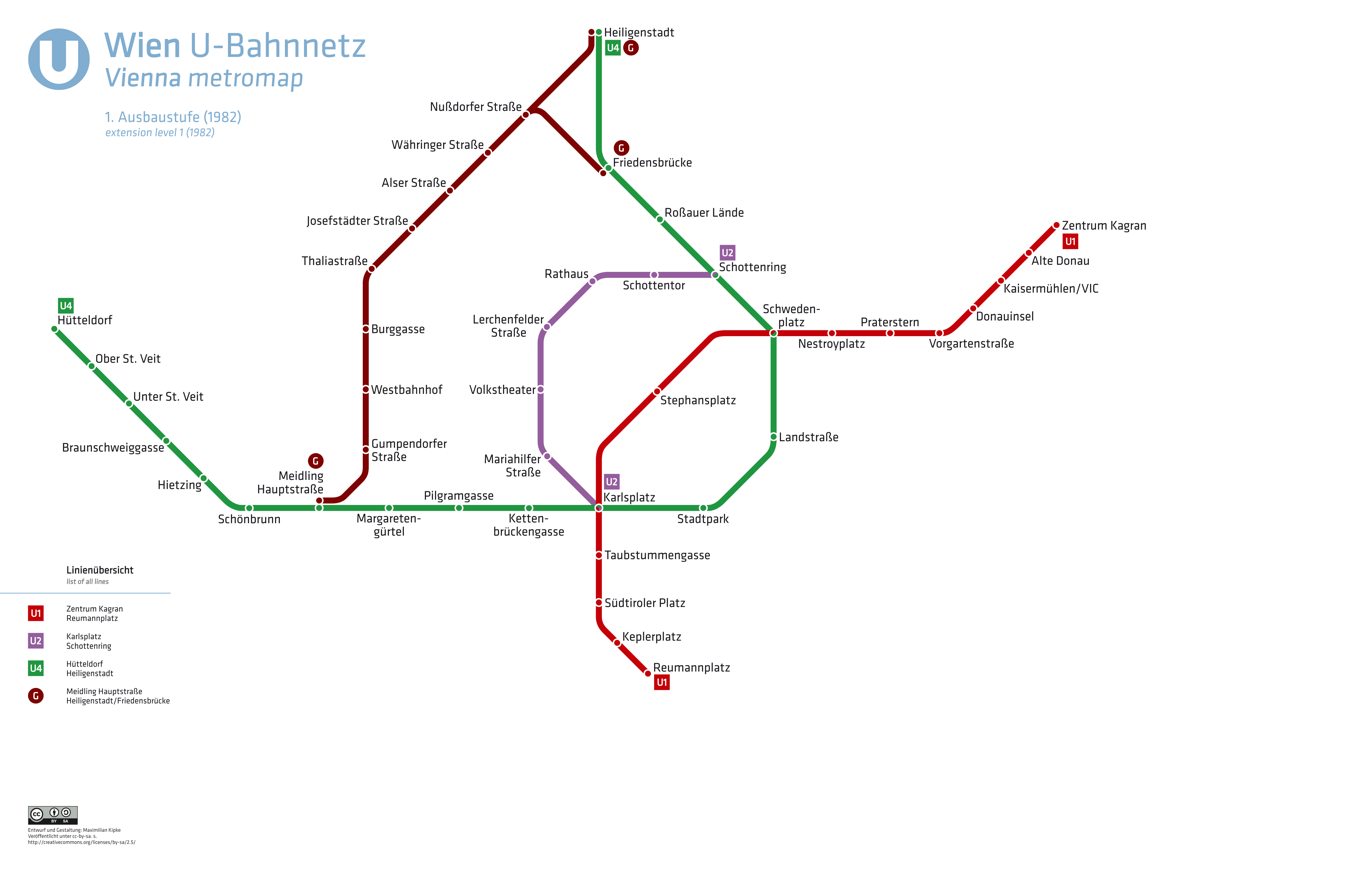
Vienna U-Bahn network in 1982 (end of first phase)

First, the basic network (Grundnetz) was chosen from the various network designs. During 1967, plans for the U2 were radically reduced and the U3 completely deleted, and the approved basic network was described as a 'closer basic network'. This closer basic network, consisting of the U1, U2 and U4 lines, included:

- New route between Reumannplatz and Praterstern
- U2 between Karlsplatz and Schottenring
- U4 between Hütteldorf and Heiligenstadt, consisting almost entirely of modification and adaptation of the existing Stadtbahn line

Construction began on 3 November 1969. On 25 February 1978, the first Vienna U-Bahn route between Karlsplatz and Reumannplatz, the U1, went into operation. With twelve partial commissionings, the Vienna U-Bahn basic network was completed on 3 September 1982.

=== Missing U5 ===
Placeholder line numbers were awarded during initial planning of the Vienna subway network between 1966 and 1973. The designation U5 was used in initial and later plans, but ultimately none of the segments with its numeration were approved for construction. In early expansion variant plans, the U5 would have run between Meidlinger Hauptstraße and St. Marx using the already partially-tunneled southern belt route. It later referred to the current branch of the line U2 from Schottenring to the stadium, which was planned to connect to a new segment to Hernals. As of 2021, there is no U5 line; today's U2 line consists of parts of the previously planned U2 and U5, which are connected by an arc between the stations Rathaus and Schottentor (this was originally planned only as an operating track and is still the narrowest curve in the Vienna subway network). The designation U3 was for a long time a gap in the network, but there was already in the construction of the basic network preliminary work. Thus, the entire tunnel tube of the U3 between Naglergasse / Graben and Stubentor was completed during construction of the U1 (at Stephansplatz), in order to avoid further excavation work in the area of the cathedral.

Since 2003, several plans and internal working papers of Vienna have again been planning long-term plans for a U5 line, but only in early 2014 did they again make concrete efforts to actually realize the line. Finally, in March 2014, it was announced that the U5 line would be constructed in several stages of development as part of a U2 / U5 line cross.

Starting at Karlsplatz, the new line will use the existing U2 section, with a new section to be built from Rathaus station northwards. In the first expansion step, however, the line will be run until 2023, for the time being, only up to one stop on Frankhplatz in the area of the old AKH. The further construction in the 17th district is planned; However, the construction costs must first be negotiated with the federal government. (See: Fifth stage of the subway network).

The current U2 will then continue southwards in newly built tunnels: From Rathaus, it will connect with the U3 at Neubaugasse and the U4 at Pilgramgasse, continuing further south and connecting with the S-Bahn network at Matzleinsdorfer Platz. The financial resources for the construction come from the previously planned, but abandoned, southern extension of the U2 towards Gudrunstraße. The already approved expenditures by the federal government have not expired and could therefore be spent on these revised expansion plans.

=== Proposed U7 ===
In some designs also a line U7 was provided, which should connect the Floridsdorf and Donaustadt districts Floridsdorf station, Kagran and Aspern east of the Danube running. However, due to insufficient urbanization, this project was not found to be meaningful and was never planned, as it would be possible to transport almost the same number of people by means of a much cheaper tram line, which is the replacement of tram line 26 east of Wagramer Straße, from there to the Ziegelhofstraße six stops further on its own track body, by the Gewerbepark Stadlau to the subway station Hausfeldstraße on the northern edge of Aspern was also reached.

=== Second expansion phase (1982–2000): Lines U3 and U6 ===
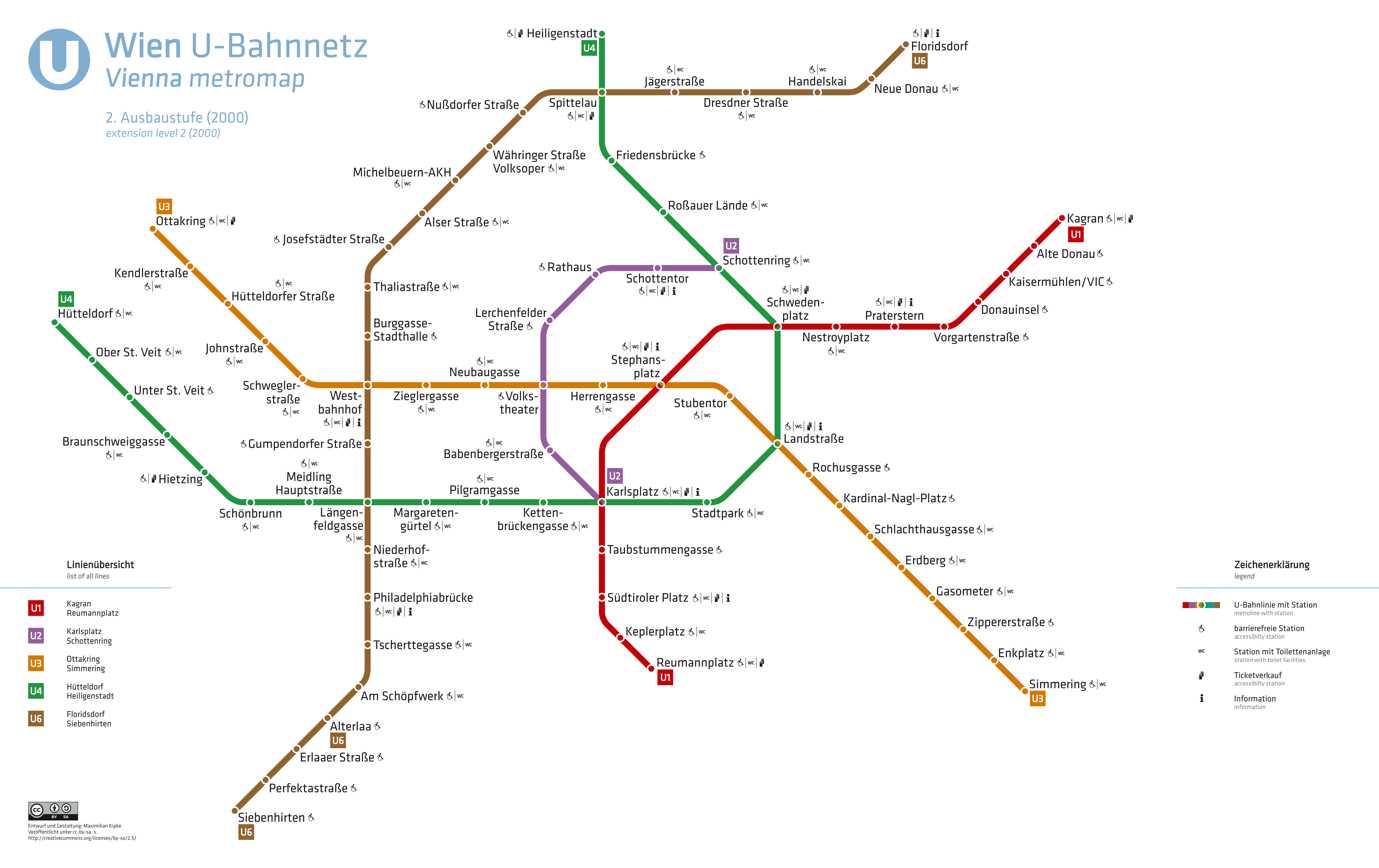
Vienna U-Bahn network in 2000 (end of second phase)

The second phase involved the expansion of the U3 and U6 lines (about 61 km (37.9 mi)). The groundbreaking ceremony for this phase took place on 7 September 1983 on Pottendsdorfer Street at the Philadelphia Bridge and after six years, the central section of the U6 between Philadelphia Bridge and Heligenstadt/Friedensbrücke went into operation.

After completion of the basic network, the Vienna subway system was extended in 1989 to the line U6 with the route Heiligenstadt-Philadelphiabrücke (10.6 km (6 mi 47 ch)). For the belt line, the last remaining line of the light rail, had been modernized and converted to legal traffic. In order to preserve the valuable building fabric, the line was not rebuilt for operation with the underground railcars of the other lines; tram or metro-like trains with overhead power lines were used. Northern line endpoint was now only Heiligenstadt; the alternative northern terminus of the last light rail line, Friedensbrücke (U4), was not approached. 1995 followed the first extension of this line in the south: from Philadelphiabrücke (now station Meidling) to Siebenhirten including the elevated railway line of the former express tram line 64 over a length of 5.2 km (3.2 mi). In 1996, the U6 was extended in the north to Floridsdorf and the previous terminus Heiligenstadt (U4) is no longer approached. The two remaining, abandoned links of the former light rail are like much of the U6 listed building and are now partly used as a bike path.

In 1991, the completely newly built line U3 between Erdberg and Volkstheater was opened, which crosses the first district after the U1 as a second line. The western terminus Ottakring was reached in 1998, the southeastern end of the U3 is since the year 2000 in the station Simmering. The total length of the network increased with these construction measures of the second stage to 61 kilometres (38 mi).

=== Third expansion phase (2001–2010): The first extensions of U1 and U2 ===
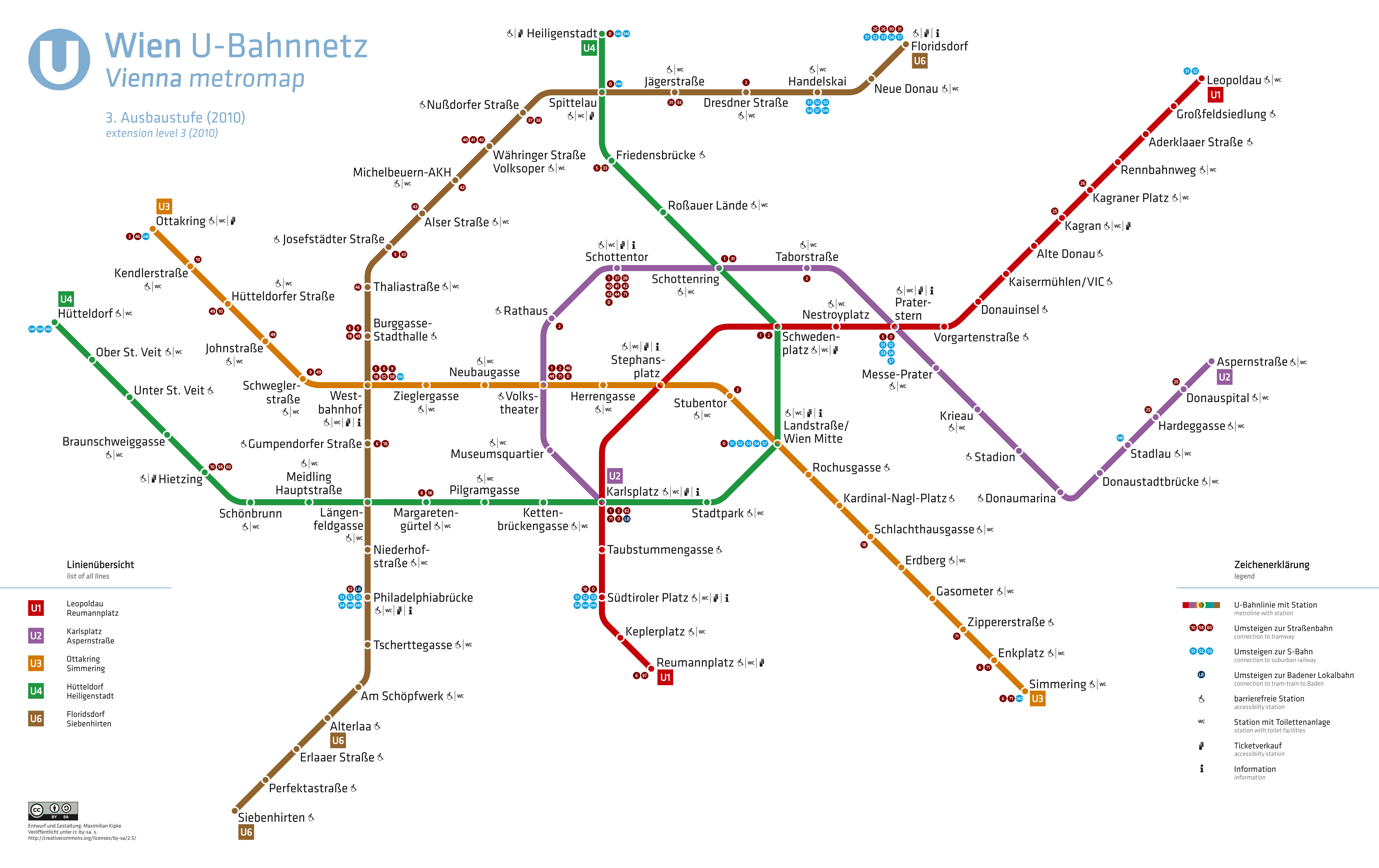
Vienna U-Bahn network in 2010 (end of third phase)

In 1996, a new U-Bahn contract, known as the "30 billion package", was settled. For the first time in Europe, a U-Bahn project had to undergo a costly and lengthy environmental impact assessment, as the U2 extension showed a length of more than 10 km (6.2 mi)). This expansion phase involved:

==== U1 extension to Leopoldau ====
On 19 October 2001, the groundbreaking ceremony for the extension of U1 was held, for which the two districts had been waiting for 20 years. After five years of construction, the 4.6 km (2.9 mi) long extension of the U1 was opened on 2 September 2006.

==== U2 extension from Schottenring to Stadium ====
On 12 June 2003, the groundbreaking ceremony took place outside the Stadion (stadium). Because of the 2008 European Football Championships in Austria, there was enormous pressure to complete the construction on time. The Wiener Linien met the deadline, and on 10 May 2008 the U2 extension to the stadium was opened.

==== U2 extension from Stadium to Aspern ====
On 2 October 2010, a further six stations were opened taking the U2 across the Danube via Donaustadtbrücke to Aspernstraße in the twenty-second district (Donaustadt). An additional 4.2-kilometer (2 mi 49 ch), three-station extension of the U2 to Aspern Seestadt was officially opened on 5 October 2013.

=== Fourth expansion phase (since 2010): Further extension of the Vienna U-Bahn ===
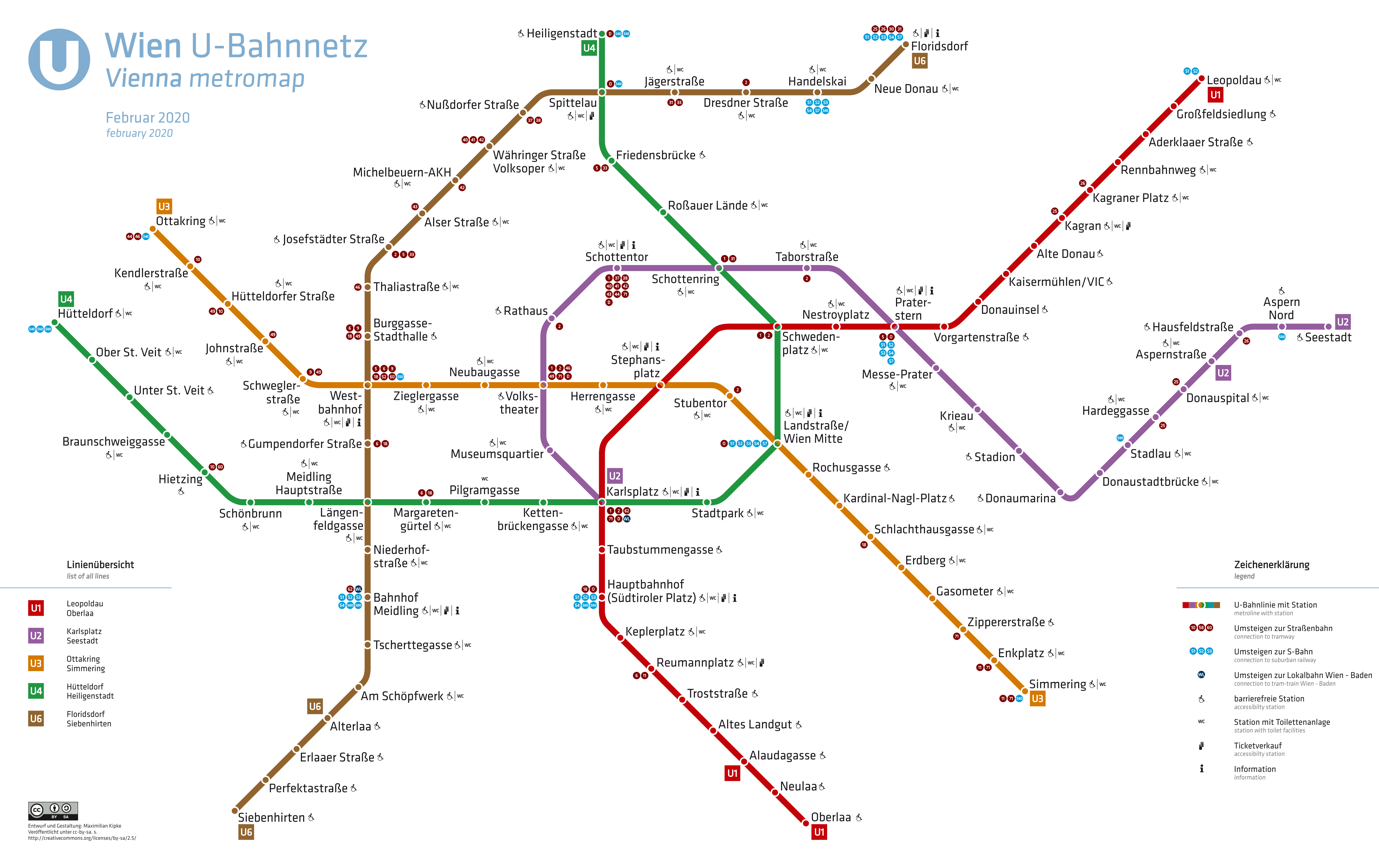
Vienna U-Bahn network in 2019

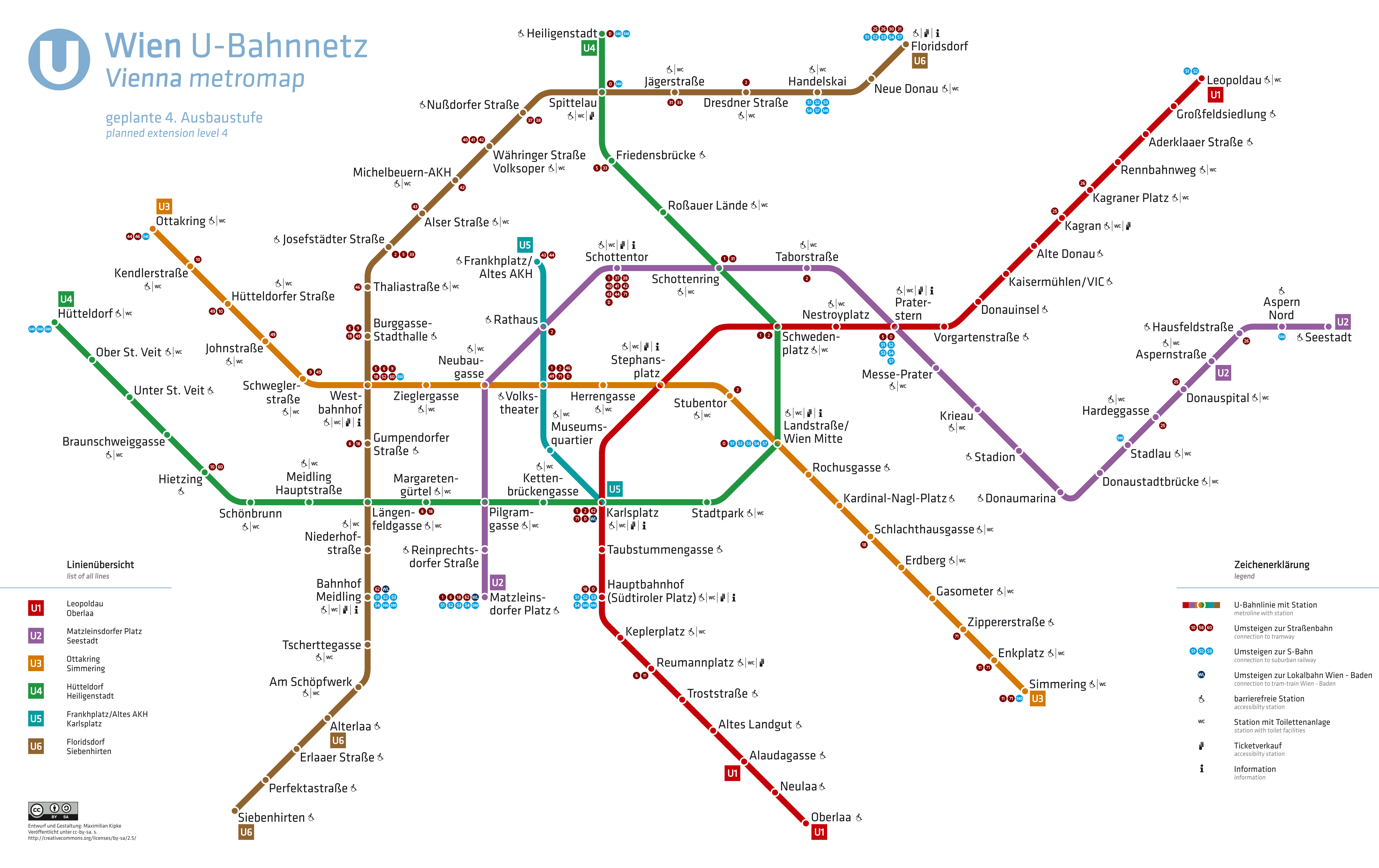
Vienna U-Bahn network in 2025 (projected end of the fourth phase)

Planning for a fourth U-Bahn expansion phase began in 2001 and concrete ideas were put forth in the 2003 Transport Master Plan. In 2007, there are plans for the extensions in Vienna, this provided the necessary extensions:

- The extended U2 from Aspernstraße to Seestadt Aspern (then time horizon 2013)
- The extended U1 from Reumannplatz to Rothneusiedl (then time horizon 2015)
- The extended U2 from Karlsplatz to Gudrunstraße (then time horizon 2019)

==== 2012 package ====
In March 2012, it was officially announced that the southern branch of U1 would instead be extended to Oberlaa and not the originally planned Rothneusiedl. This was achieved by expanding the pre-existing route of tram line 67. The change to the original plans was thought to be due cost issues or the incomplete development of the area surrounding Rothneusiedl. This extension was ultimately opened to the public on 2 September 2017, thereby expanding the Vienna metro network by 4.6 kilometres (2 mi 69 ch) and 5 stations. In the area of the station Alaudagasse preparations for a future line bifurcation were made, should the further development in Rothneusiedl warrant a branch line there.

==== 2014 package ====
The originally planned southern extension of U2 to Gudrunstraße indefinitely delayed for financial reasons and since the need suggested is no longer there. With the budgeted funds, the so-called line cross U2 / U5 will be created instead. The line U2 coming from Seestadt and Schottentor will receive a new south branch, leading to the S-Bahn station Matzleinsdorfer Platz. The remaining route of the U2 between Karlsplatz and Universitätsstraße will be taken over by a newly created U5 line, which will be supplemented by the station Frankhplatz (Altes AKH) for the time being. This line should also lead a fully automatic operation, as currently used at the Nuremberg U-Bahn. The U5 line will be Vienna's first driverless U-Bahn line. Start of construction for the resulting crossroads is scheduled for 2018, 2024 (U5), and 2026 (U2) respectively.

=== Fifth expansion phase: Extension of U2 and U5 ===
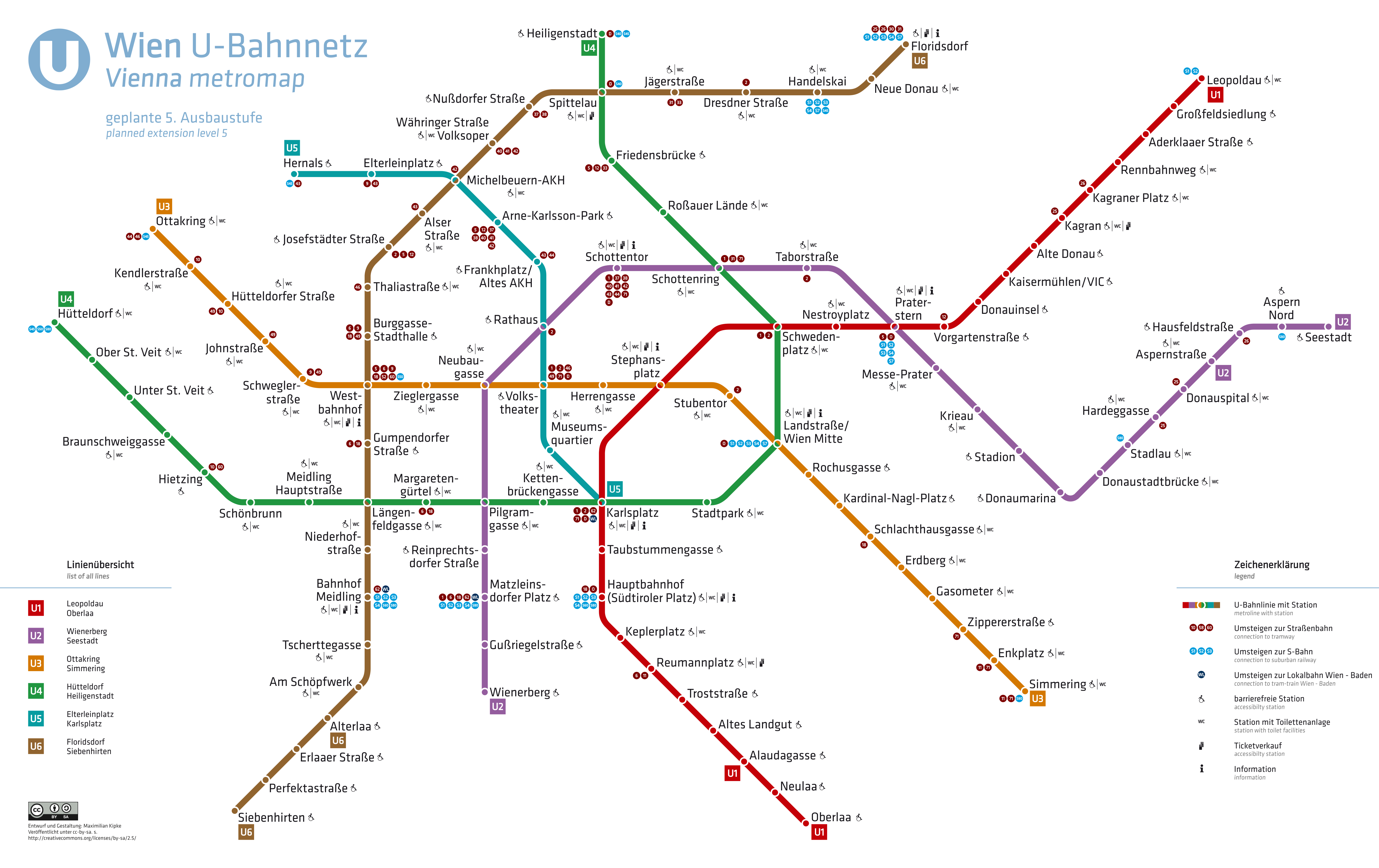
Projected network 2030 (end of the fifth phase)

It is planned to extend the U2 line from Matzleinsdorfer Platz to Wienerberg and to extend the U5 from Frankhplatz to Hernals. One further possibility is to build a second southern branch of the U1, which would terminate in Rothneusiedl.

=== Further expansion options ===
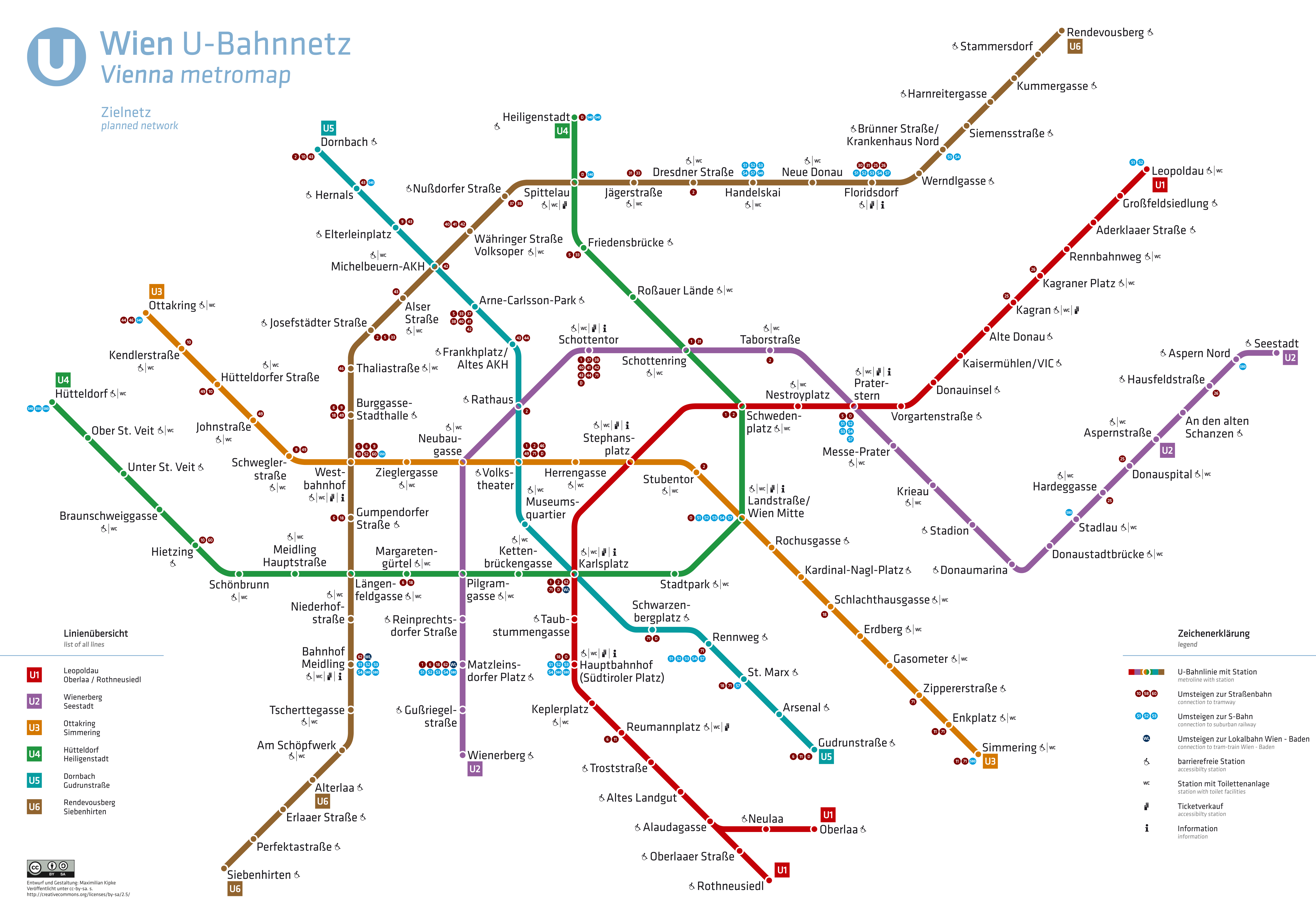
Possible future expansion

Other possible expansion options are:

- Expanding the U5 beyond Hernals to Dornbach
- Expanding the U5 beyond Karlsplatz as was planned in the 4th expansion phase for the U2

=== Timeline ===

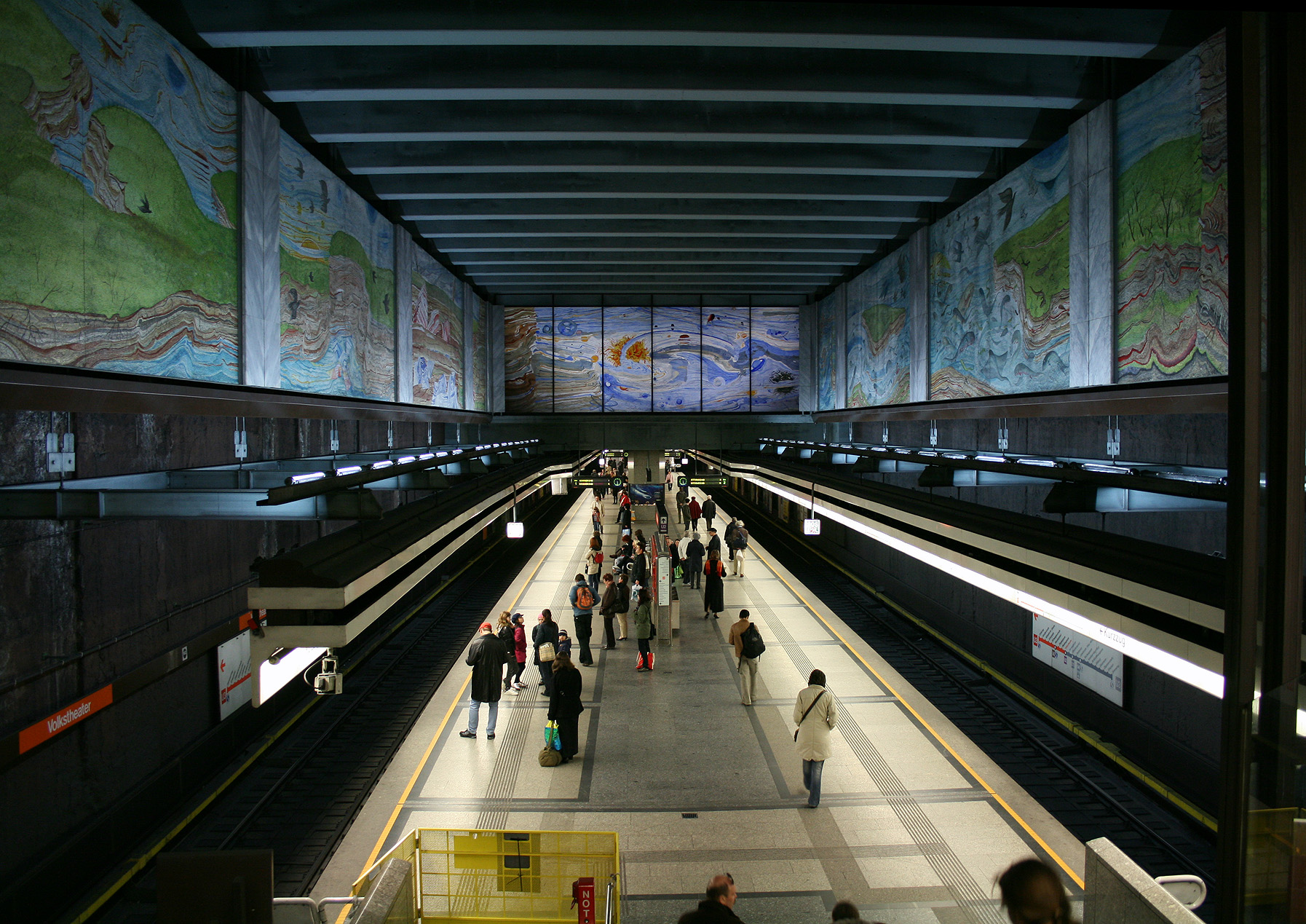
Volkstheater U-Bahn station (line U3), with mosaics by Anton Lehmden

Date	Line	Stretch opened	Stretch closed
1976-05-08	U4 (Vienna U-Bahn)	Heiligenstadt – Friedensbrücke	
1978-02-25	U1 (Vienna U-Bahn)	Reumannplatz – Karlsplatz	
1978-04-03	U4 (Vienna U-Bahn)	Friedensbrücke – Schottenring	
1978-08-15	U4 (Vienna U-Bahn)	Schottenring – Karlsplatz	
1978-11-18	U1 (Vienna U-Bahn)	Karlsplatz – Stephansplatz	
1979-11-24	U1 (Vienna U-Bahn)	Stephansplatz – Nestroyplatz	
1980-08-30	U2 (Vienna U-Bahn)	Karlsplatz – Schottenring	
1980-10-26	U4 (Vienna U-Bahn)	Karlsplatz – Meidling	
1981-02-28	U1 (Vienna U-Bahn)	Nestroyplatz – Praterstern	
1981-08-31	U4 (Vienna U-Bahn)	Meidling Hauptstraße – Hietzing	
1981-12-20	U4 (Vienna U-Bahn)	Hietzing – Hütteldorf	
1982-09-03	U1 (Vienna U-Bahn)	Praterstern – Kagran	
1989-10-07	U6 (Vienna U-Bahn)	Philadelphiabrücke –Heiligenstadt/Friedensbrücke	
1991-03-04	U6 (Vienna U-Bahn)		Nußdorfer Straße – Friedensbrücke
1991-04-06	U3 (Vienna U-Bahn)	Erdberg – Volkstheater	
1993-09-04	U3 (Vienna U-Bahn)	Volkstheater – Westbahnhof	
1994-09-03	U3 (Vienna U-Bahn)	Westbahnhof – Johnstraße	
1995-04-15	U6 (Vienna U-Bahn)	Philadelphiabrücke – Siebenhirten	
1996-05-04	U6 (Vienna U-Bahn)	Nußdorfer Straße – Floridsdorf	Nußdorfer Straße – Heiligenstadt
1998-12-05	U3 (Vienna U-Bahn)	Johnstraße – Ottakring	
2000-12-02	U3 (Vienna U-Bahn)	Erdberg – Simmering	
2003-09-27	U2 (Vienna U-Bahn)		Lerchenfelder Straße station
2006-09-02	U1 (Vienna U-Bahn)	Kagran – Leopoldau	
2008-05-10	U2 (Vienna U-Bahn)	Schottenring – Stadion	
2010-10-02	U2 (Vienna U-Bahn)	Stadion – Aspernstraße	
2013-10-05	U2 (Vienna U-Bahn)	Aspernstraße – Seestadt	
2017-09-02	U1 (Vienna U-Bahn)	Reumannplatz – Oberlaa	
2026-01-19	U2 (Vienna U-Bahn)	Lina-Loos-Platz station	

== Rolling stock ==
The Vienna U-Bahn has three types of rolling stock, and has permanent way equipment. The U1, U2, U3, and U4 have two types of rolling stock: the older U/U11/U2 type (introduced in 1972, 1986 and 2000 each) and the newer V type (introduced in 2000). The U6 has one train family, the T/T1 type (introduced in 1993). The older E6/c6 trams have been retired in 2008 and now operate in Kraków in Poland, with a single E6+c6 set being preserved at Vienna's tramway museum ("Remise") and another E6 LRV in service as a locomotive (Type EH).

=== U1-U5 ===
==== U/U_{11}/U_{2} class ====
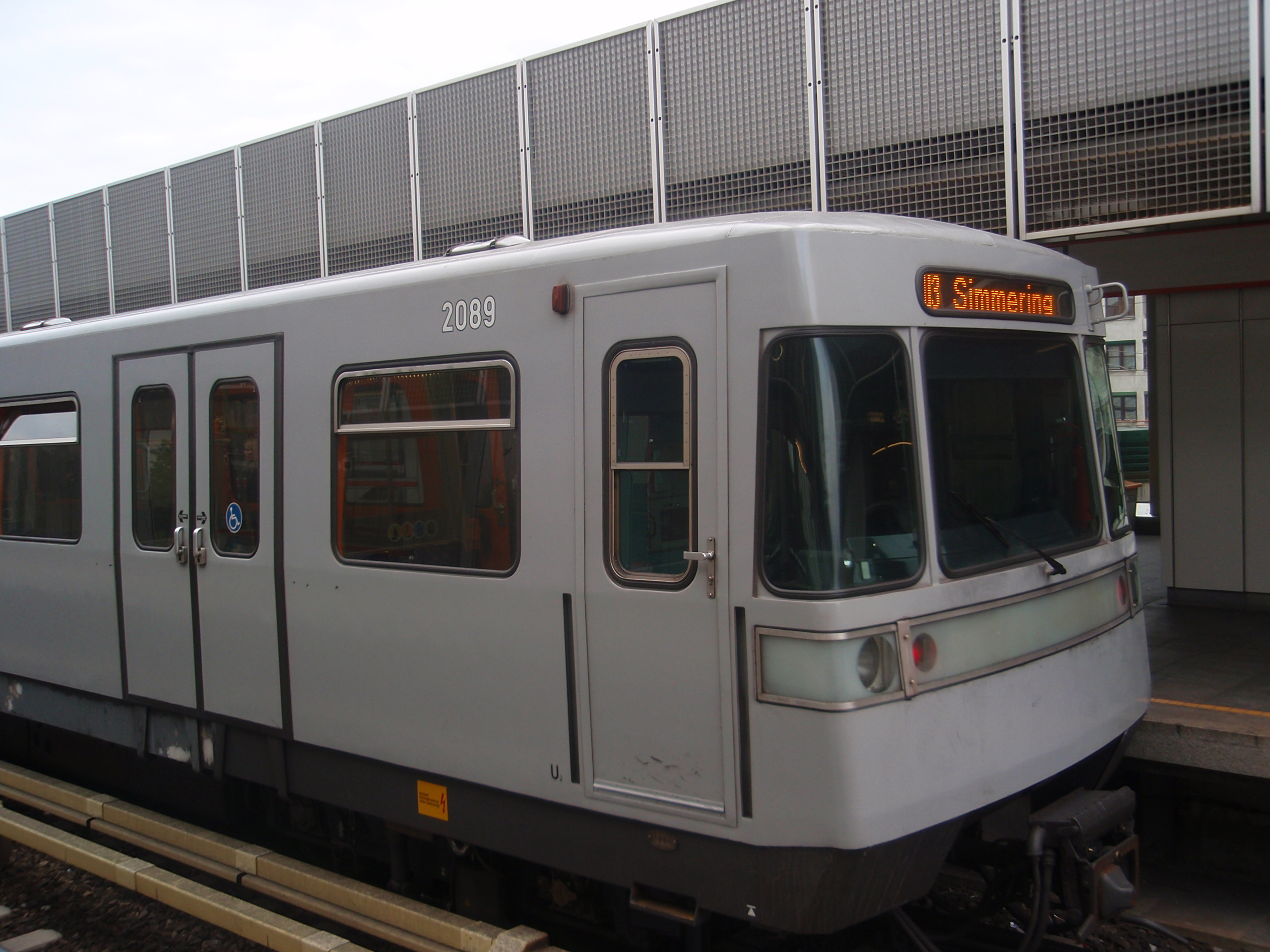
Type U_{2} at Ottakring

The first type U cars, developed by Simmering-Graz-Pauker (SGP), were delivered in 1972. Type U cars ride on two motorized trucks and are permanently coupled into married pairs 36.8 meters (120 ft 9 in) long and 2.8 meters (9 ft 2 in) wide. A train is made up of three married pairs, for a total of six cars. Until 2008, two-car trains were used during off-peak times or on the U2 line. Technically, the cars are very similar to the Munich and Nuremberg subway trains, however there are significant differences in their physical appearance. By 1982, a total of 270 type U cars had been delivered.

Starting in 1987, SGP built the type U11 (prototype models known as U1, later renamed to avoid confusion with the line U1), the second generation that resembles its predecessor. However, the technical equipment was further developed and includes water-cooled three-phase motors, regenerative braking, and modernized emergency braking and safety equipment. They operate on lines U1, U4, and occasionally U3.

Between 2000 and 2010, the newer half of the type U series were rebuilt and equipped with new three-phase motors, extending their service life by another 20 years. The converted trains are called type U2 and operate on line U3. The older U1 cars were all retired by 2017.

The interior of a car consists of four four-seat-bays in the middle section, nine seats at the driverless end, and two four-seat-bays at the driver's cab end of the car. The U1 and U2 trains were upgraded with LED displays in 2006 and door closing lights in the 2010s. Additionally, all U11 stock and some U2 stock received plastic seats and video surveillance. An individual railcar has 49 seats and space for 91 standing passengers, while a train consisting of six cars provides 294 seats and standing room for 546 passengers. The maximum speed is 80 km/h (50 mph). The "Silver Arrows" design was created by railway designer Johann Benda.

==== Type V ====
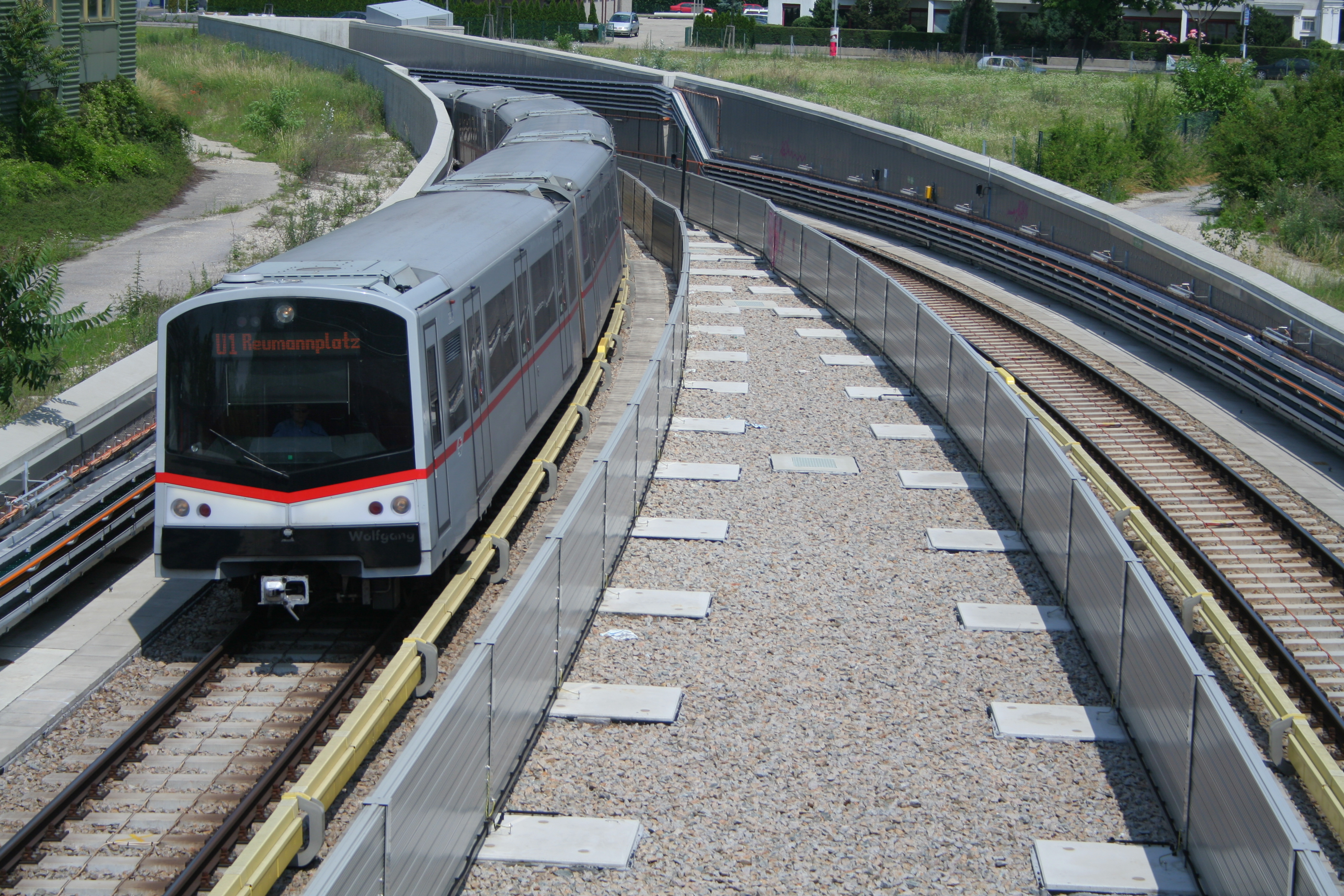
Type V approaching Aderklaaer Straße

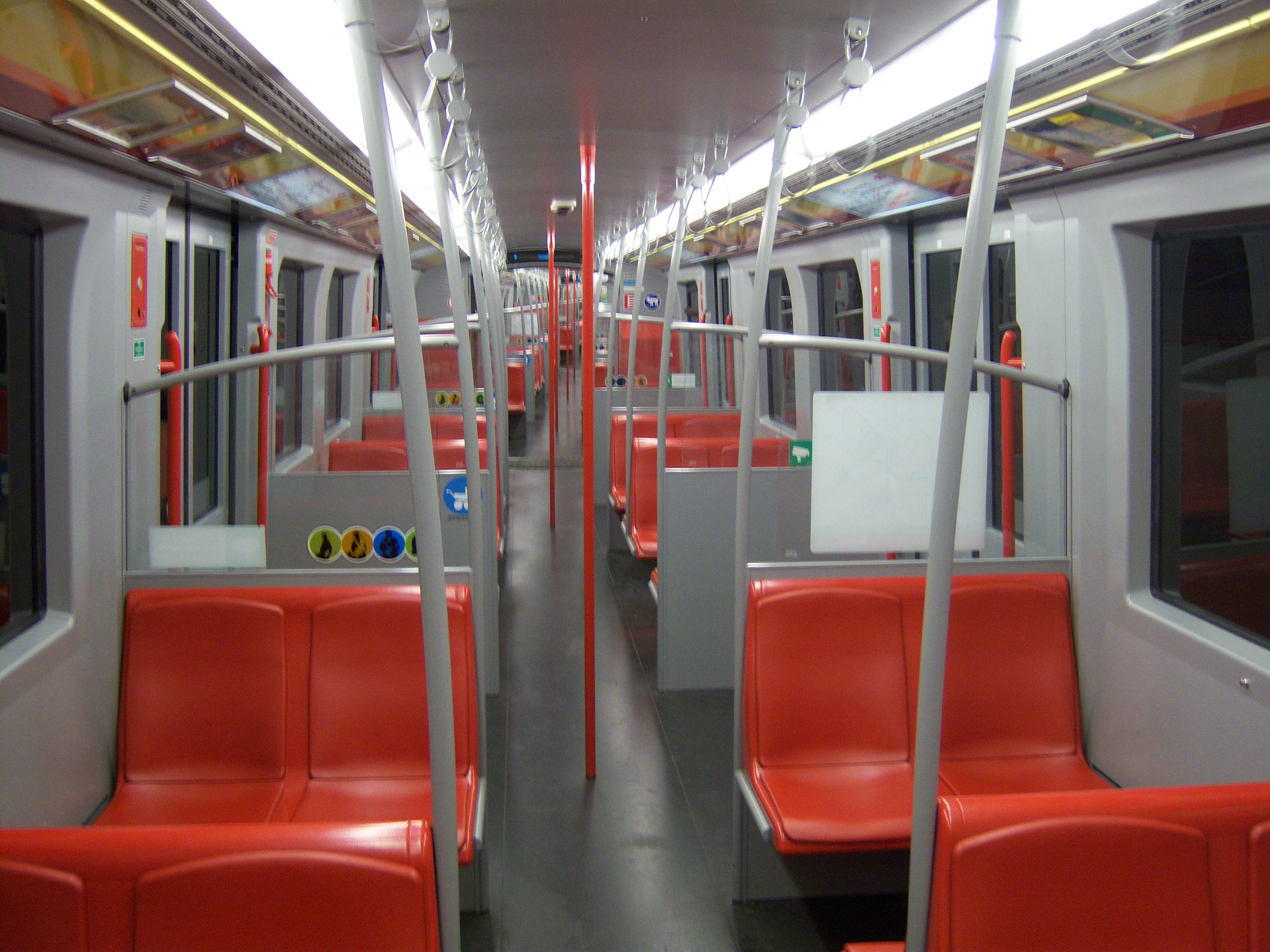
Interior of a Type V train

In the late 1990s, a consortium of companies—Siemens, ELIN, and Adtranz—developed a new train called type V, or "V-Car." It is an articulated, permanently-coupled six-car train consisting of two non-motorized control cars and four motorized intermediate cars. A set of Type V cars is the same length as a six-car train of type U cars. The exterior appearance was developed by Porsche Design. The Type V trains provide 260 seats and space for 618 standing passengers. Their top speed is 80 km/h (50 mph). The trains are in service on lines U1-U4.

After a prototype was placed in service on U3 in December 2000, 25 sets were ordered in June 2002, followed by another 15 sets in December 2007. The first of these sets were delivered starting in February 2005 and were commissioned in mid-August 2006, after numerous delays. At the end of September 2009, another 20 vehicles were ordered.

Compared to the prototype, the production models featured an updated interior design. The wall color was changed from white to gray, and the originally installed fabric seats were replaced with plastic seats. The newer type V trains also have yellow handrails instead of gray-red ones as well as larger LED passenger information displays to improve accessibility. Each car contains four four-seat-bays in the middle section and six seats at each transition between cars. At both ends of the train, there are multipurpose compartments with four folding seats each, as well as automatically extending ramps at every station to close the platform gap. These trains were the first in the Vienna subway system to be equipped with air conditioning and video surveillance by default.

To minimize station dwell time and prevent obstructions by passengers, the doors use sensitive sensor edges instead of light barriers. Once a door is individually opened, it will only close again as part of a centralized closing operation. All doors can also be opened simultaneously by the train's operator.

The trains are equipped with extensive safety equipment, including fire detectors in the roof areas, temperature sensors, and dry extinguishing pipes on the undercarriage. Any smoke detection or excessive temperature readings are immediately transmitted to the driver.

==== Type X ====
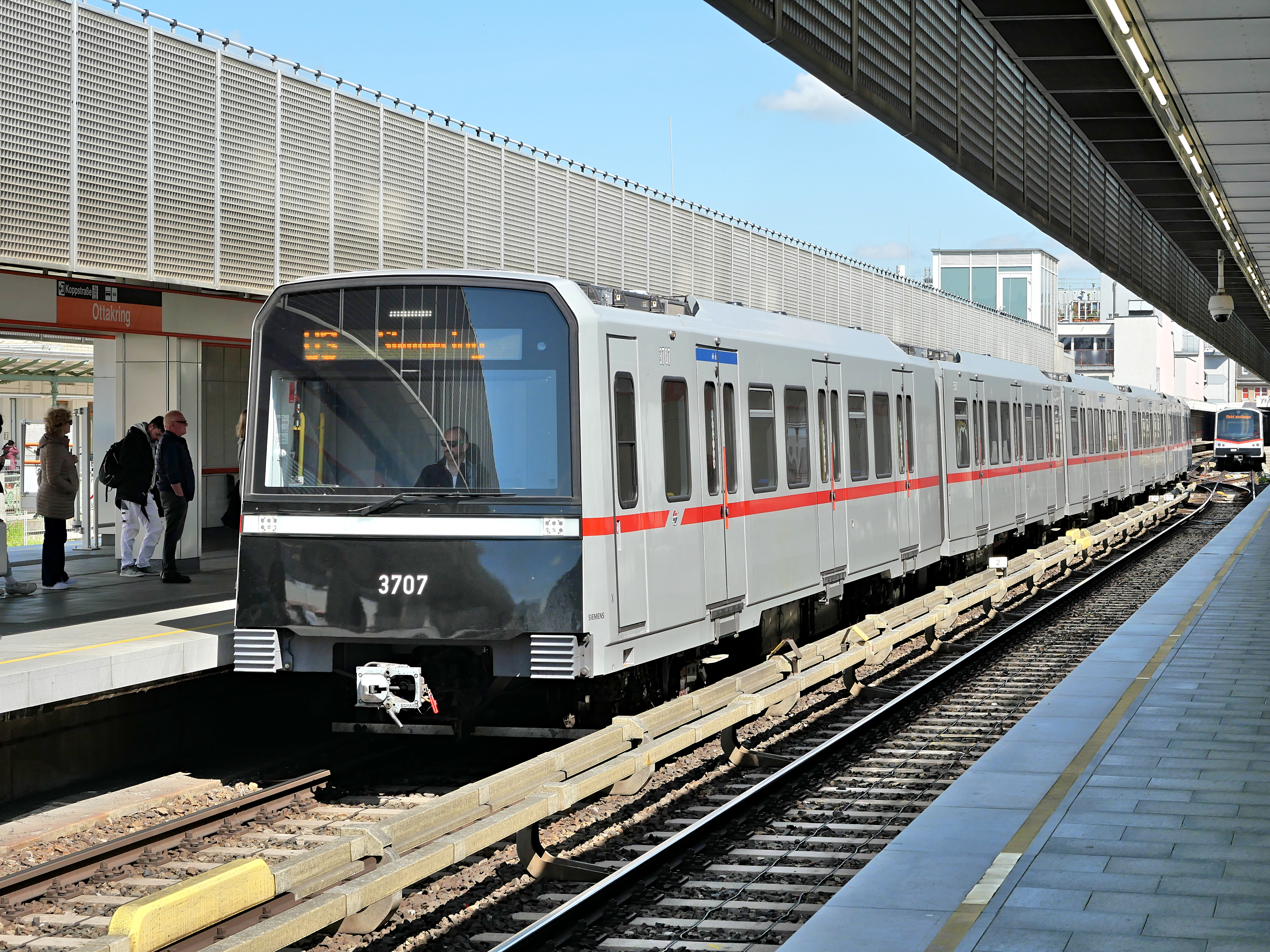
Type X in Ottakring station

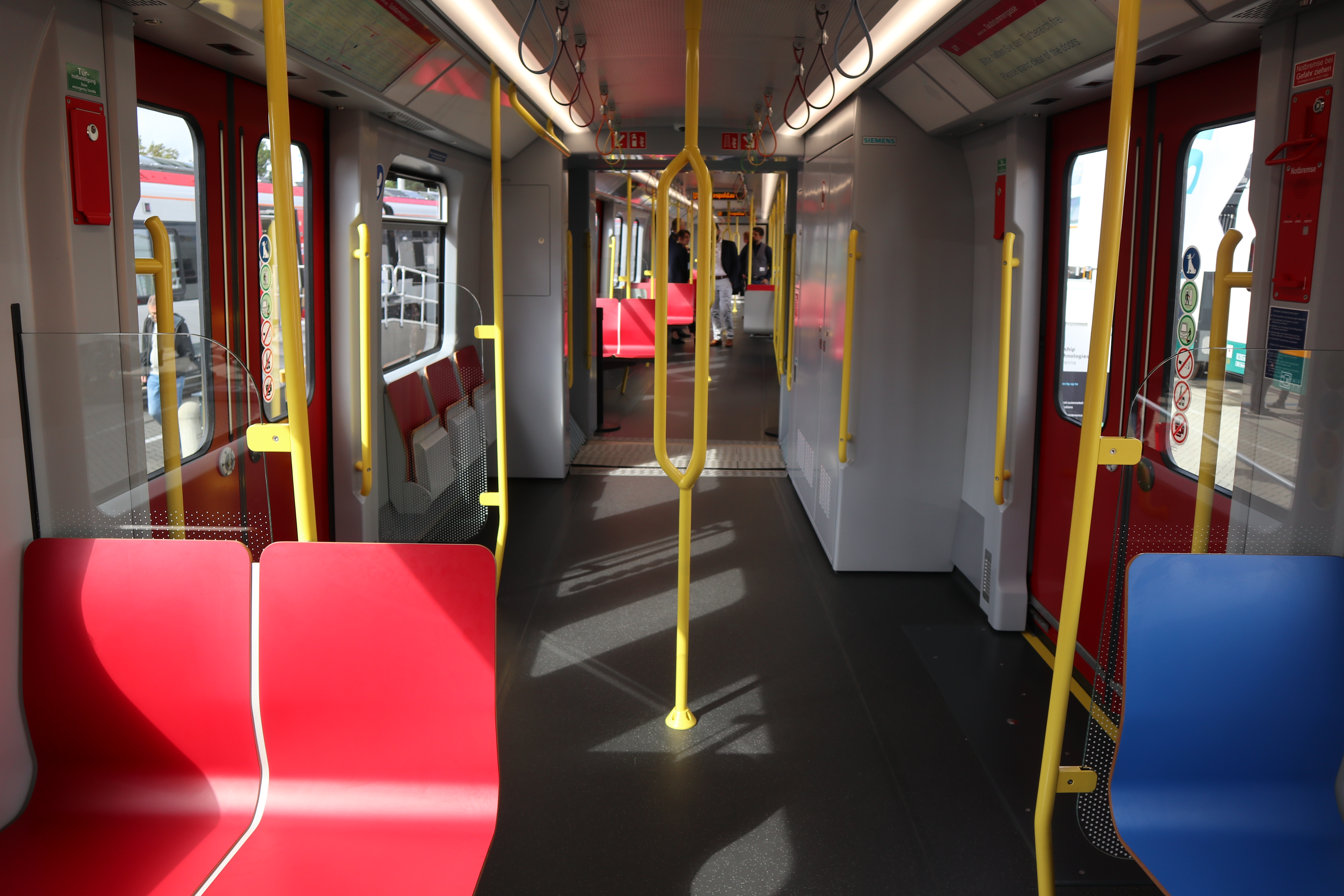
Interior of the Type X

Siemens was contracted in September 2017 to deliver and maintain 34 six-car type X trains. The order includes an option for an additional eleven trains. The vehicles are designed for both fully automated and driver-operated service. The first trains arrived in the spring of 2020 and entered service on 16 June 2023. The final trains are scheduled for delivery by the end of 2030. They currently operate on lines U2 and U3, and will be used for the upcoming U5.

=== Line U6 ===
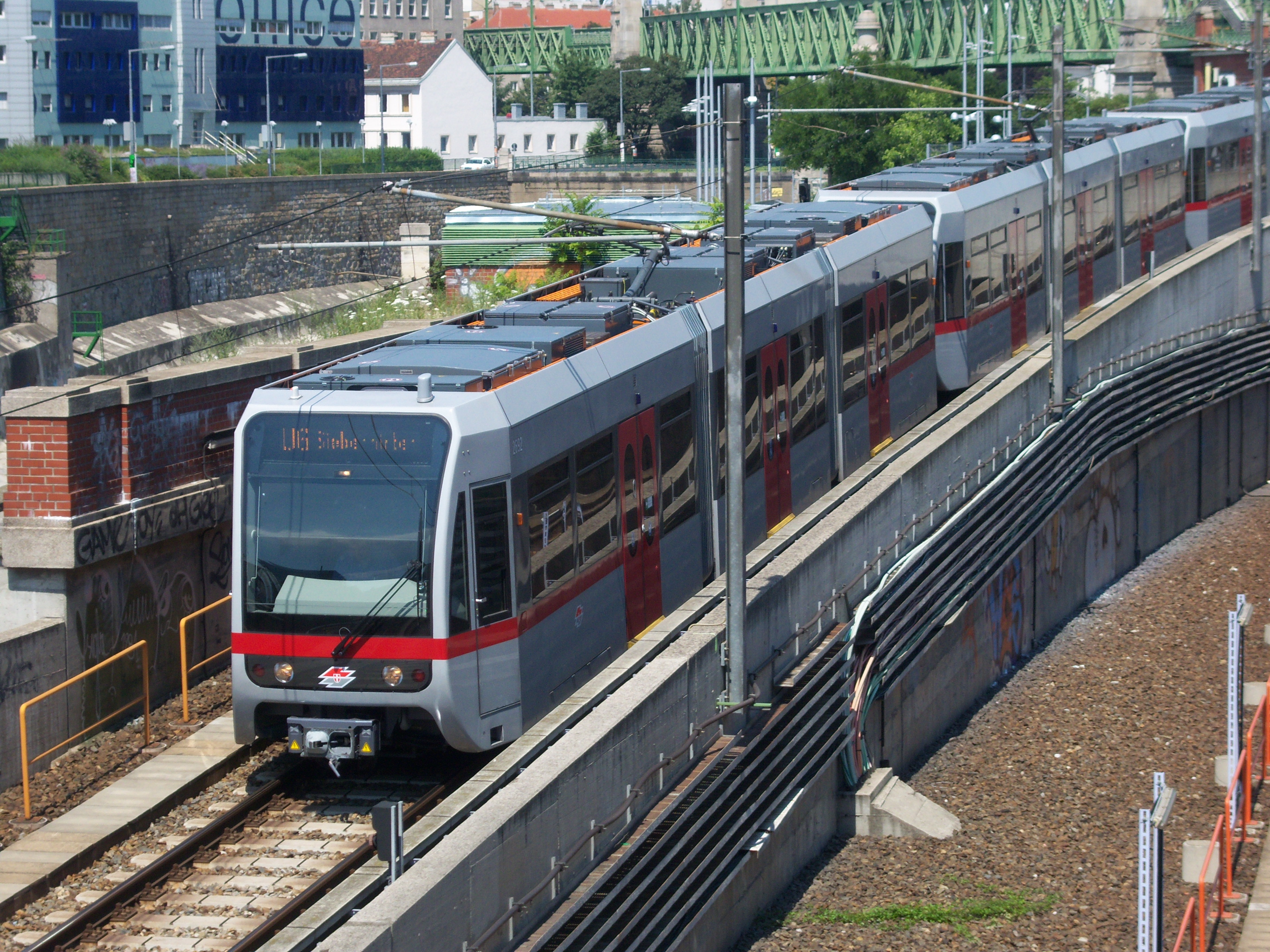
Type T1 at Längenfeldgasse

The line U6 was originally slated for rapid transit conversion like the U4. However, since the old line was unable for a full conversion without tearing down the historial structures, the planners opted for a light metro line. Today, line U6 has major differences to the other lines, featuring low-floor LRVs with overhead wires and optical signals.

==== Type T ====
Since 1993, Bombardier Wien has been developing 2.65-meter (8 ft 8 in) wide, double-articulated low-floor vehicles of the Type T. These vehicles are similar to the Type 400 used on the Badner Bahn and serve as the base for the successful Flexity Swift vehicle family. Each car consists of three articulated sections, and a full train comprises four cars. Until 2008, shorter trains consisting of three sets also operated during off-peak hours. Initially, some type T cars operated in conjunction with older E6/c6 cars to make sure that each train included at least one low-floor car. Today, however, only trains composed entirely of type T and T1 cars are in service. Each train has 232 seats and standing room for 544 passengers.

A further development of the type T, known as the type T1, has been in use since May 2008. These vehicles feature air conditioning, video surveillance, and electronic interior and exterior displays, along with an updated design. The Type T1 replaced the older E6/c6 high-floor cars. Since 24 December 2008, only type T and T1 vehicles have been in operation on the U6 line.

The type T and T1 cars can be coupled together, allowing mixed operation.

At the end of 2009, type T cars began receiving upgrades, including LED interior and exterior displays and video surveillance to enhance passenger and staff safety while reducing vandalism. Additionally, the older fabric seats in the Type T cars have gradually been replaced by red plastic seats with yellow handles, similar to those found in type T1 and Type V cars. Vehicles of the T-type family have been equipped with warning lights to indicate door closures. Also, the motors were upgraded and the exterior was repainted to match the T1 livery.

For transport to tram depots and the central depot, type T/T1 cars are equipped for tram operation, however, they're too wide to be used for passenger service.

=== Former Trains ===
From the light rail operation, the 2.3-meter (7 ft 7 in) wide, six-axle articulated type E6 railcars and type c6 sidecars, known as the "Mannheim type," were adopted. These vehicles were built in 1979 by Lohner and Rotax under a Düwag license. A full train provided 192 seats and 432 standing places. Until the end of 2008, these trains still operated in conjunction with Type T cars in the formation E6 + c6 + T + c6 + E6. In May 2008, delivery of the Type T1 cars began, intended to fully replace the E6/c6 trains. On 23 December 2008, the E6/c6 cars made their final run on the U6 line.

Most of the vehicles were sold to Utrecht or Kraków. The E6 and c6 vehicles previously in Utrecht were later sold to Kraków in 2014. In Vienna, a E6+c6 set was preserved for the Remise museum, while another E6 train got converted to a locomotive (internally called EH) to haul T/T1 trams, which are unable to drive, from the U6 depots to the main workshop, which is still in service as of June 2025.

== Art ==
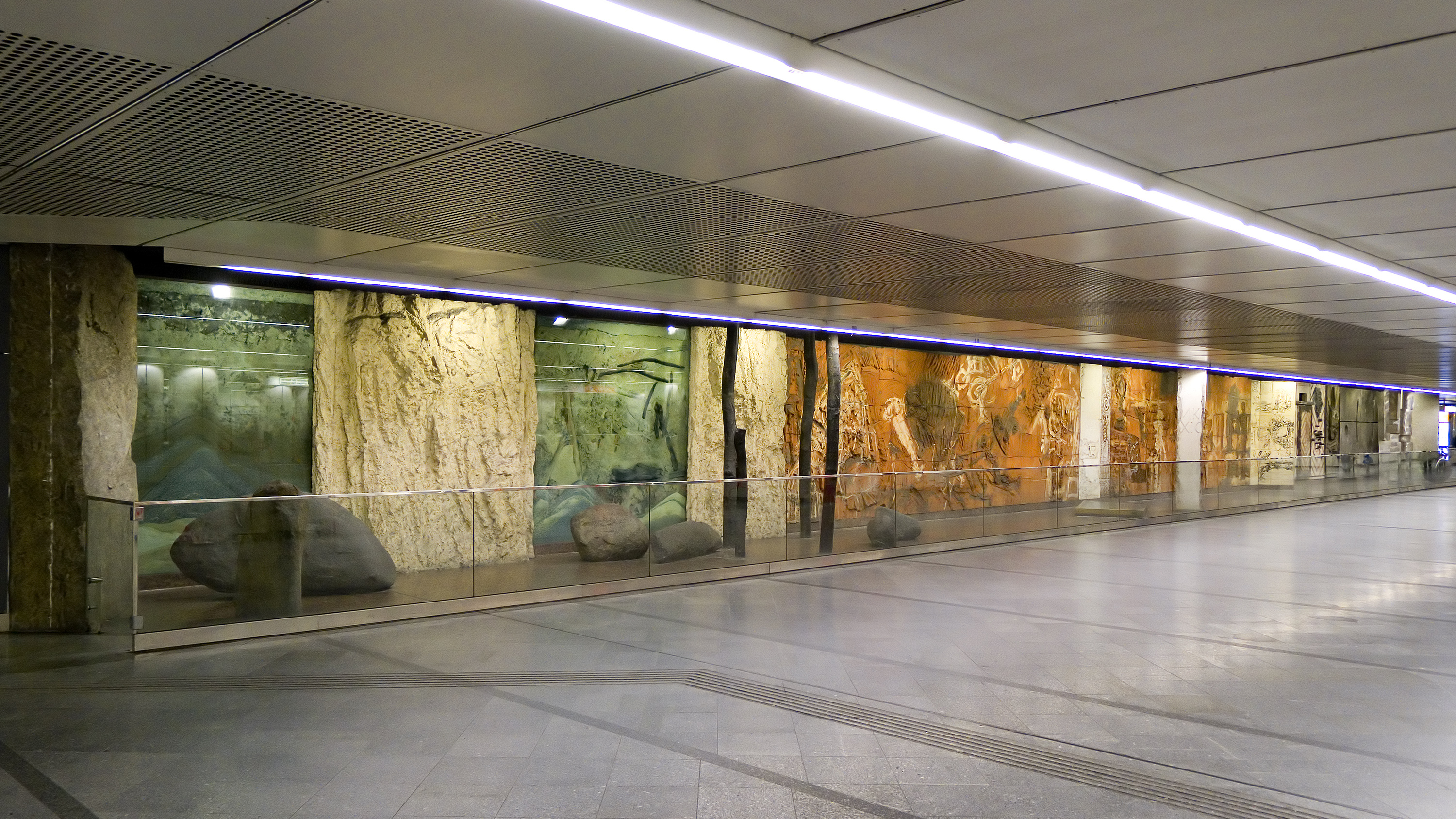
Metro station Westbahnhof (U3, U6): Installation Circa 55 steps through Europe

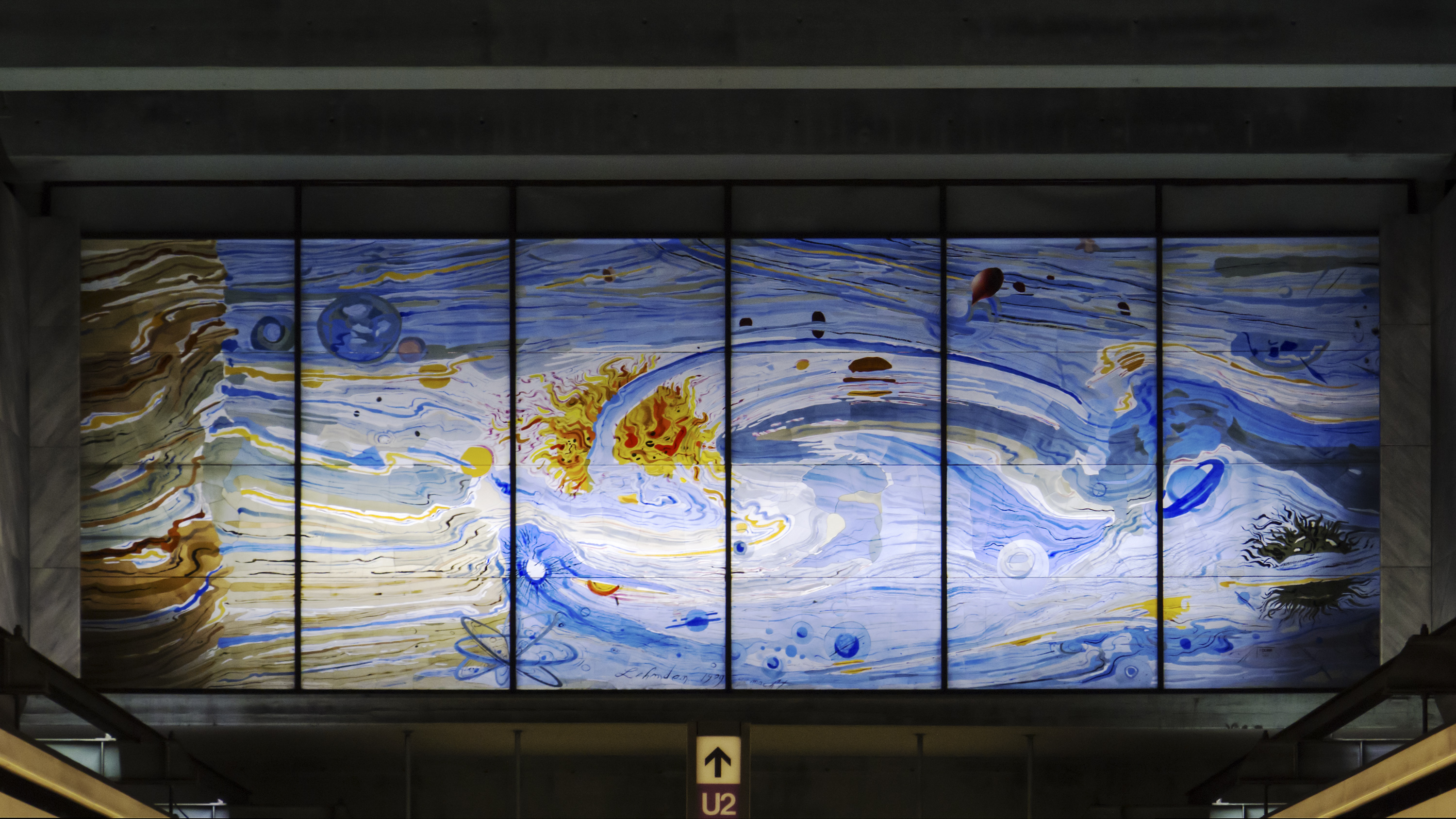
Wall paintings in the station Volkstheater (U2, U3) Das Werden der Natur

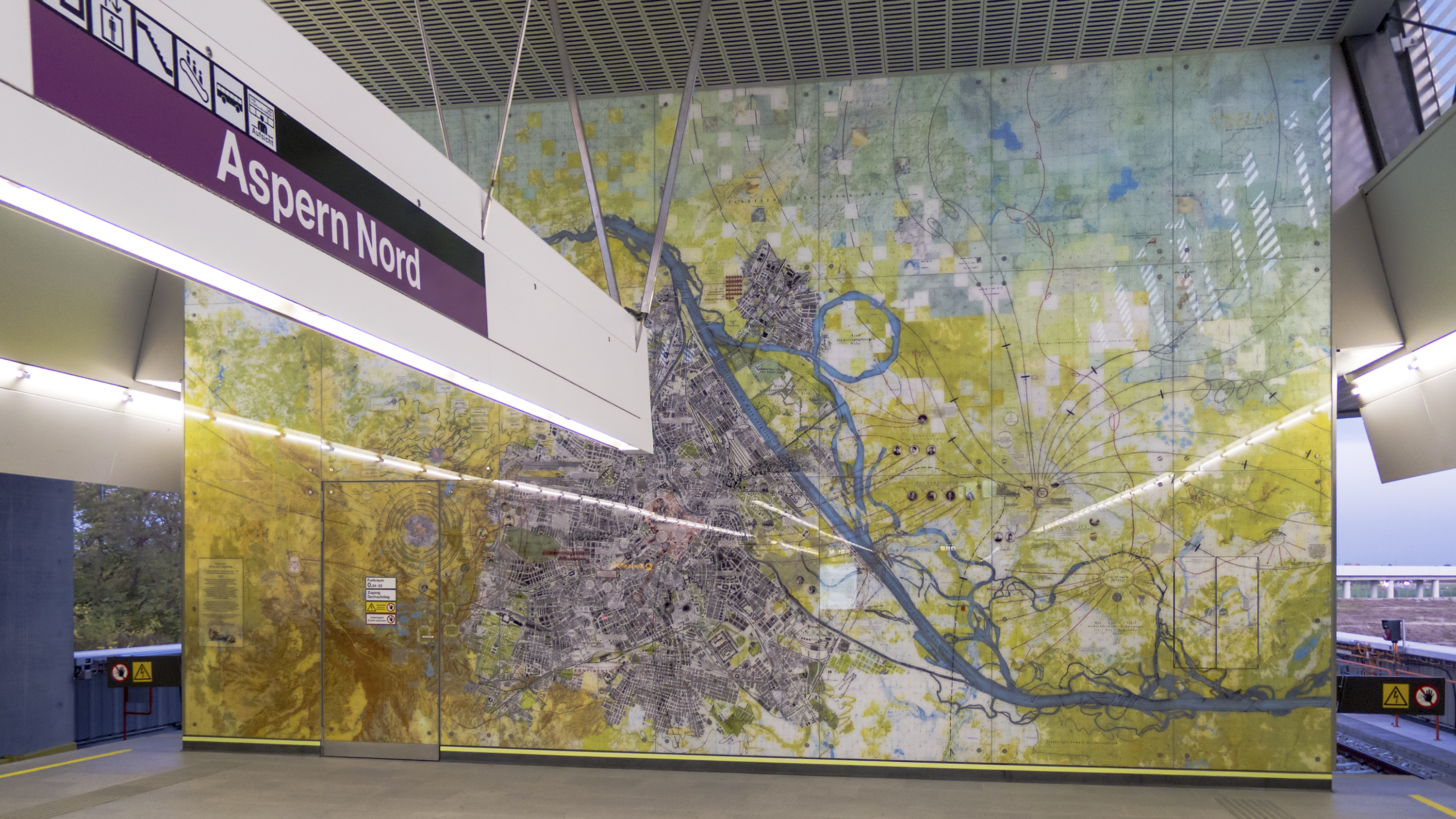
Painting in the metro station Aspern Nord (U2) Aspern Affairs (1912)

In common with many urban transit systems, the Vienna U-Bahn has art works in stations. These include:

- Altes Landgut: Face Surveillance Snails by Yves Netzhammer.
- Aspern Nord: Aspern Affairs, two big artistic maps of Vienna at the end of the platform, one showing the situation in 1809 during the Napoleonic Wars and one of 1912, where the airport in Aspern (at the time the biggest airport in Europe) can be seen. Also there are colored "lifelines" above the tracks that show the names of famous people, and the dates of their birth and death. The artworks were created by Stephan Huber.
- Erdberg: Mosaics Stadteinwärts and Stadtauswärts by Peter Atanasov
- Hütteldorfer Straße: U-BauAlphabet by Georg Salner
- Johnstraße: übertragung by Michael Schneider
- Karlsplatz: Pi by Ken Lum
- Karlsplatz: Spatial installation by Peter Kogler
- Karlsplatz: Frieze Unisono di colori by Ernst Friedrich und Eleonor Friedrich
- Landstraße: Enamel wall by Oswald Oberhuber
- Landstraße: Installation Planet der Pendler mit den drei Zeitmonden by Kurt Hofstetter
- Laurenzgasse: Mural by Heimo Zobernig
- Museumsquartier: Lauf der Geschöpfe, Der Jubilierende, Wächter, Lebenskeim and Tor des Verborgenen by Rudi Wach
- Ottakring: U-Turn by Margot Pilz
- Ottakring: Graffiti wall by Wiener Graffiti Union
- Praterstern: Einen Traum träumen und ihn mit anderen teilen ... by Susanne Zemrosser
- Schottentor: varying installations in glass case
- Schweglerstraße: Kunst der Technik by Nam June Paik
- Stadlau: Nepomuk by Werner Feiersinger
- Stubentor: Bewegungen der Seele by Michael Hedwig
- Südtiroler Platz – Hauptbahnhof: SUED by Franz Graf
- Taborstraße: ein Garten (zum Beispiel) by Ingeborg Strobl
- Volkstheater: Das Werden der Natur by Anton Lehmden
- Westbahnhof: Cirka 55 Schritte durch Europa by Adolf Frohner
- Zippererstraße: Kid's Kunst – Mobilität im kommenden Jahrtausend (children's art)
- Rochusgasse: Roman archaeological remains

== See also ==
- Transportation in Vienna
- Vienna S-Bahn
- Trams in Vienna
- List of metro systems
- Wiener Lokalbahnen
