= Split platform =

Railway station with a platform for each track, but on different levels

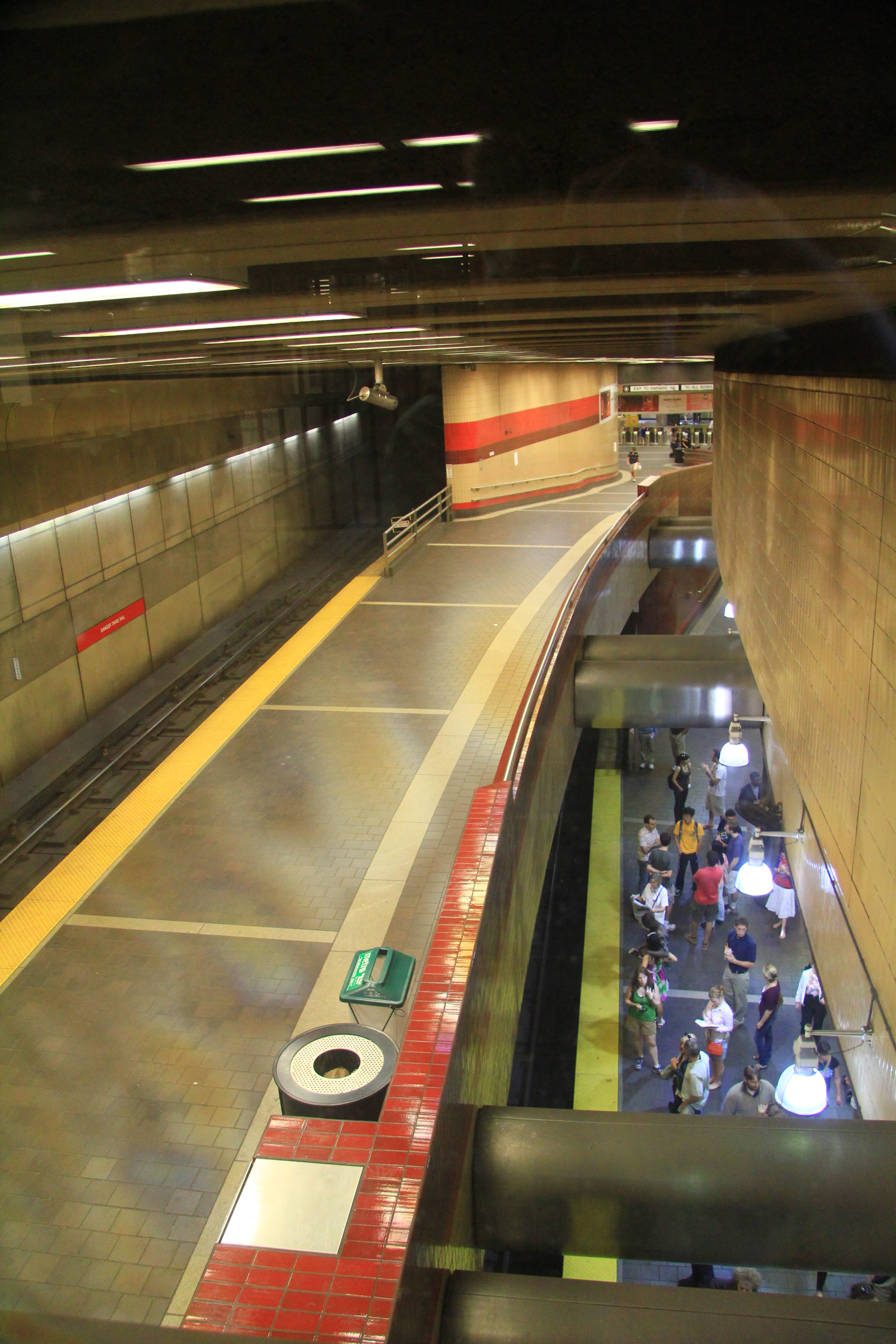
A pair of split level platforms in Harvard station of the Boston-Cambridge MBTA Red Line service. The upper (outbound) platform at left is empty, while the lower (inbound) platform is relatively crowded.

A split platform, stacked platform, or separate platform is a station that has a platform for each track, split onto two or more levels. This configuration allows a narrower station plan (or footprint) horizontally, at the expense of a deeper (or higher) vertical elevation, because sets of tracks and platforms are stacked above each other. Where two rail lines cross or run parallel for a time, split platforms are sometimes used in a hybrid arrangement that allows for convenient cross-platform interchange between trains running in the same general direction.

== Reasons for usage ==
On the London Underground, to minimise the risk of subsidence, the tunnel alignments largely followed the roads on the surface and avoided passing under buildings. (Note: This is because a time limit was set for the compulsory purchase of land and the raising of capital to encourage railway companies to complete the construction of railways as soon as possible.) If a road was too narrow to allow the construction of side-by-side tunnels, they would be aligned one above the other, so that a number of stations have platforms at different levels. It is also sometimes used if the line branches from the station, so diverting tunnels or tracks do not intersect each other.

== Examples ==
=== North America ===
Examples of split platform layout in the United States are Rosslyn on the Washington Metro's Blue, Silver and Orange Lines; Pentagon on the Washington Metro's Blue and Yellow Lines; North Station on the MBTA Green and Orange Lines; Harvard and Porter stations on the Boston-Cambridge MBTA Red Line. Split platforms are also at downtown Oakland, California on BART's 12th and 19th Street stations, as well as in Los Angeles Metro Rail's Wilshire/Vermont station. MARTA's Ashby station uses the configuration to separate the eastbound and westbound platforms.

In the New York City Subway, Nostrand Avenue, Kingston Avenue and Utica Avenue stations on the IRT Eastern Parkway Line have two tracks on each level, with each of the two levels serving trains in one direction. Further north on the Eastern Parkway line, Borough Hall also has split platforms. Also, stations on the IND Eighth Avenue Line have split stacked platforms between 59th Street – Columbus Circle and Cathedral Parkway – 110th Street due to the proximity of the line to Central Park. In other stations like Fulton Street, Borough Hall, and Fifth Avenue / 53rd Street, platforms are stacked due to the narrowness of the street directly above the station. One notable station, Wilson Avenue on the BMT Canarsie Line, has one elevated platform and one at-grade platform, due to the narrowness of the line's right-of-way.

In Canada, split platforms on the Montreal Metro are located at De l'Église and Charlevoix, as well as on the Blue Line at Jean-Talon, while Snowdon and Lionel-Groulx have a hybrid layout where the two directions on each line are split from each other but share an island platform with the other line to allow for cross-platform transfers. They are also found on Vancouver's SkyTrain, at the stations in the Dunsmuir Tunnel and at the King Edward station on the Canada Line.

=== Europe ===
The London Underground uses split platform layouts on the deep tube lines, namely the Bakerloo, Central, Jubilee, Northern and Piccadilly lines. (Note: Stations like Baker Street and Camden Town have split island platforms to provide cross-platform interchange between lines or branches.)

Sant'Agostino station on line M2 of the Milan Metro uses the layout, as do all stations between Crocetta and Turati on line M3.

On Munich Marienplatz Station the Munich S-Bahn (suburban trains) are on two separate levels, where westbound trains depart from the lower level, eastbound trains from the upper level. Below the westbound level there is an interchange to the metro lines U3 and U6 in North-South direction.

In Nuremberg metro network, the station Plärrer has two platforms for cross-platform interchange between lines U1 and U2/U3. The upper platform is used for westbound/outbound services, while the lower one is designated for eastbound/inbound trains.

In Hanover light-metro network, Kröpcke has three levels, one for blue lines (3, 7 and 9); SW to NE, one for red lines (1, 2 and 8); NW to SE and one for yellow lines (4, 5, 6 and 11). The red lines level and the yellow lines level are situated directly below each other. An interchange between red and yellow lines is possible at Aegidientorplatz where the underground platforms are situated the same way like Plärrer. Eastbound/outbound trains use the lower platform, westbound/inbound trains use the upper one.

On Berlin U-Bahn line U9, the Schloßstraße station has two level platforms, with southbound trains departing from the lower level and northbound trains from the upper level. The station has two island platforms, one above the other, but the western part is closed off by a wall and is not in use, as it was originally designed to accommodate a transfer to the unbuilt U10 line.

On Vienna U-Bahn line U3, the stations Neubaugasse, Zieglergasse, Herrengasse, Stephansplatz and Stubentor have two levels of platforms. Trains towards Ottakring (westbound) use the lower platform, trains towards Simmering the upper one. In Stephansplatz the line U1 crosses below these platforms.

On Prague Metro Line B station Rajská zahrada have two levels. Trains towards Černý Most use first level (lower), trains towards Zličín use second level (upper).

On the Brussels metro network, a similar arrangement can be found at stations Merode and Weststation (on lines 2 and 6).

=== Asia ===
In Asia, Jingan, Yongan Market, Taipei Bridge, Zhonghe, Qiaohe, Zhongyuan, and Fuzhong on the Taipei Metro have split stacked platforms, Dadong on Kaohsiung Metro's Orange line, Central, Wan Chai, Causeway Bay, Tin Hau, Sai Wan Ho on MTR's Island line, Tsing Yi on MTR's Airport Express and Tung Chung line, To Kwa Wan on MTR's Tuen Ma line, and Nanpu Bridge station on line 4 of Shanghai Metro all have split platforms.

In Japan, examples of split platforms include Sekime-Seiiku Station on the Imazatosuji Line in Osaka, Misasagi Station on the Kyoto Municipal Subway and the Keihan Keishin Line, Ginza-itchōme Station on the Tokyo Metro Yūrakuchō Line, Machiya Station on the Tokyo Metro Chiyoda Line, and Kenchōmae Station and Sannomiya Station on the Kobe Municipal Subway. When Makuharitoyosuna Station opened on the Keiyo Line on 18 March 2023, it became the newest split platform in the country.

In Southeast Asia; examples of split stacked platforms include Bukit Bintang on the Kajang line; Persiaran KLCC and Ampang Park on the Putrajaya Line; Sam Yot, Wat Mangkon, Sam Yan, Si Lom, and Lumphini station on the Blue Line (Bangkok); Kampung Bandan on the KRL Commuterline; Promenade and Stevens station on Singapore's Downtown MRT line; and Napier, Maxwell, Shenton Way, Marina Bay, Katong Park, and Tanjong Katong stations on Singapore's Thomson-East Coast MRT line. The Jurong Region MRT line is set to feature one such station: Jurong East.

=== Australia ===
In Melbourne, all three City Loop stations, Parliament, Melbourne Central and Flagstaff have bi-level platforms with an island platform at each level.

In Sydney, Town Hall station is bi-level with platforms at each level; while Wynyard, Martin Place and Wolli Creek station have bi-level platforms that aren't directly on top of each other. Additionally the surface level Redfern has underground platforms as part of the Eastern Suburbs line, while Epping has underground platforms as part of the Sydney Metro North West & Bankstown Line. Central has underground platforms for both the Eastern Suburbs line and the North West & Bankstown Line.

== Bibliography ==
- Day, John R; Reed, John (2008) [1963]. The Story of London's Underground. Capital Transport. ISBN 978-1-85414-316-7.
