= Landstraße station =

Vienna U-Bahn station

Landstraße
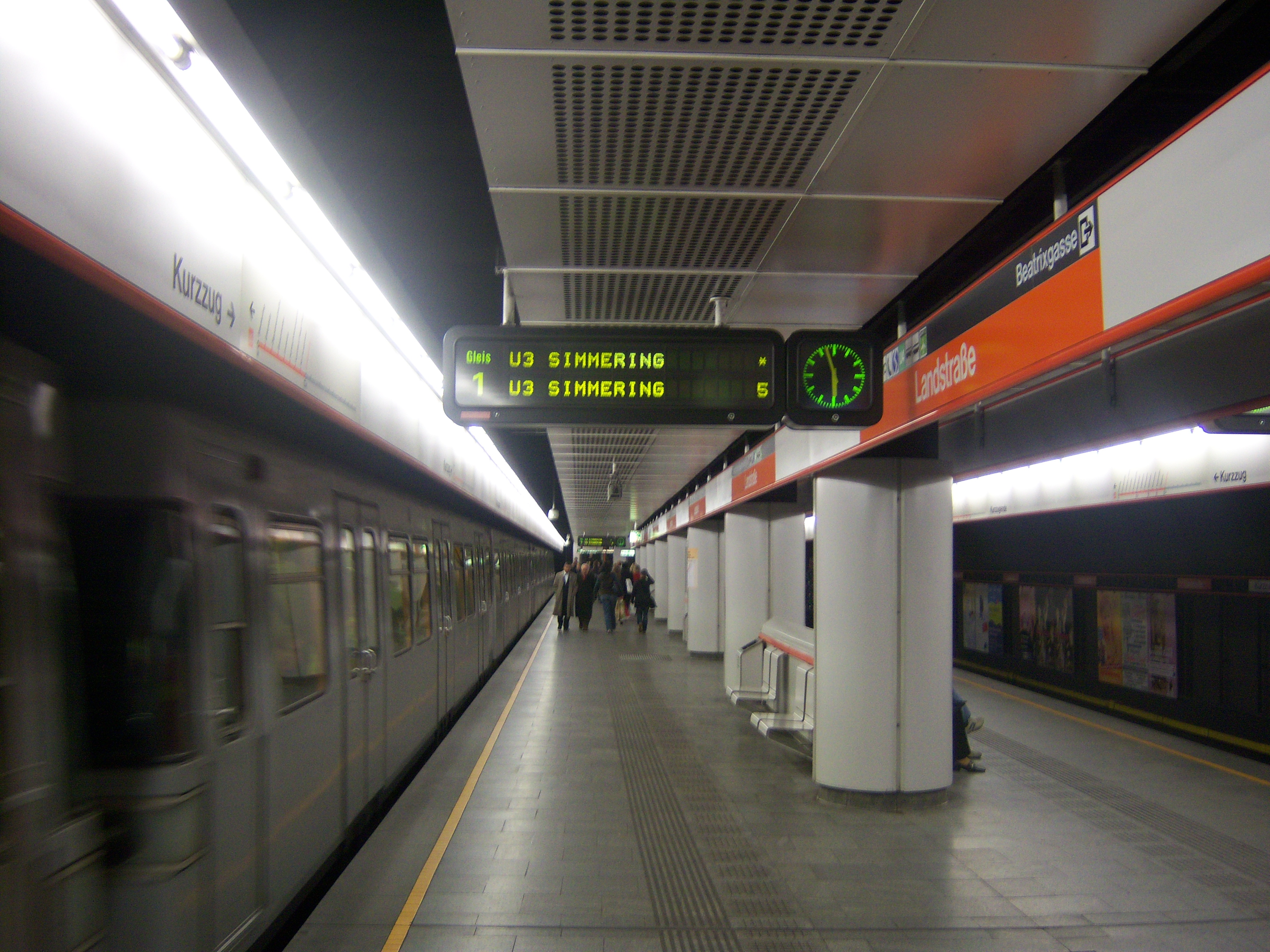

General information
- Location: Landstraße, Vienna; Austria
- Coordinates: 48.2063°N 16.3847°E
- Connections: Wien Mitte railway station

History
- Opened: 1978

Services
Preceding station	Wiener Linien	Following station
Stubentor toward Ottakring	U3	Rochusgasse toward Simmering
Stadtpark toward Hütteldorf	U4	Schwedenplatz toward Heiligenstadt
Location

Landstraße is a station on U3 and U4 of the Vienna U-Bahn. It is located in the Landstraße District. It opened in 1978.

This station connects with Vienna S-Bahn and City Airport Train at Wien Mitte railway station.

== Art ==
Found in this station are:

- "Planet der Pendler mit den drei Zeitmonden" by Kurt Hofstetter
- "Emailwand" by Oswald Oberhuber
