= Johnstraße station =

Vienna U-Bahn station

Johnstraße
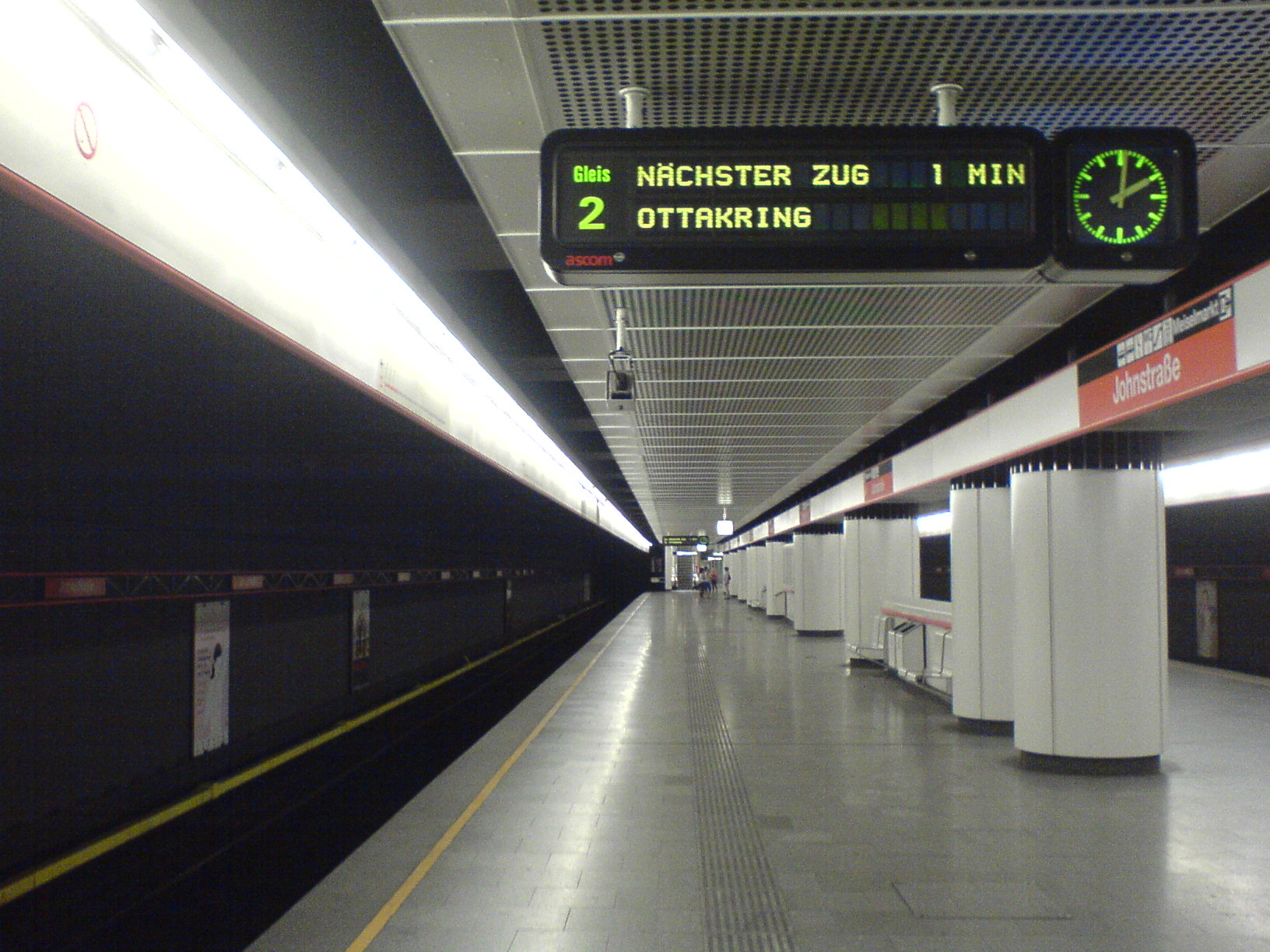

General information
- Location: Rudolfsheim-Fünfhaus, Vienna; Austria
- Coordinates: 48.1983°N 16.3198°E

History
- Opened: 1994

Services
Preceding station	Wiener Linien	Following station
Hütteldorfer Straße toward Ottakring	U3	Schweglerstraße toward Simmering
Location

Johnstraße is a station on U3 of the Vienna U-Bahn. It is located in the Rudolfsheim-Fünfhaus District. It opened in 1994.
