= Hütteldorfer Straße station =

Vienna U-Bahn station

Hütteldorfer Straße
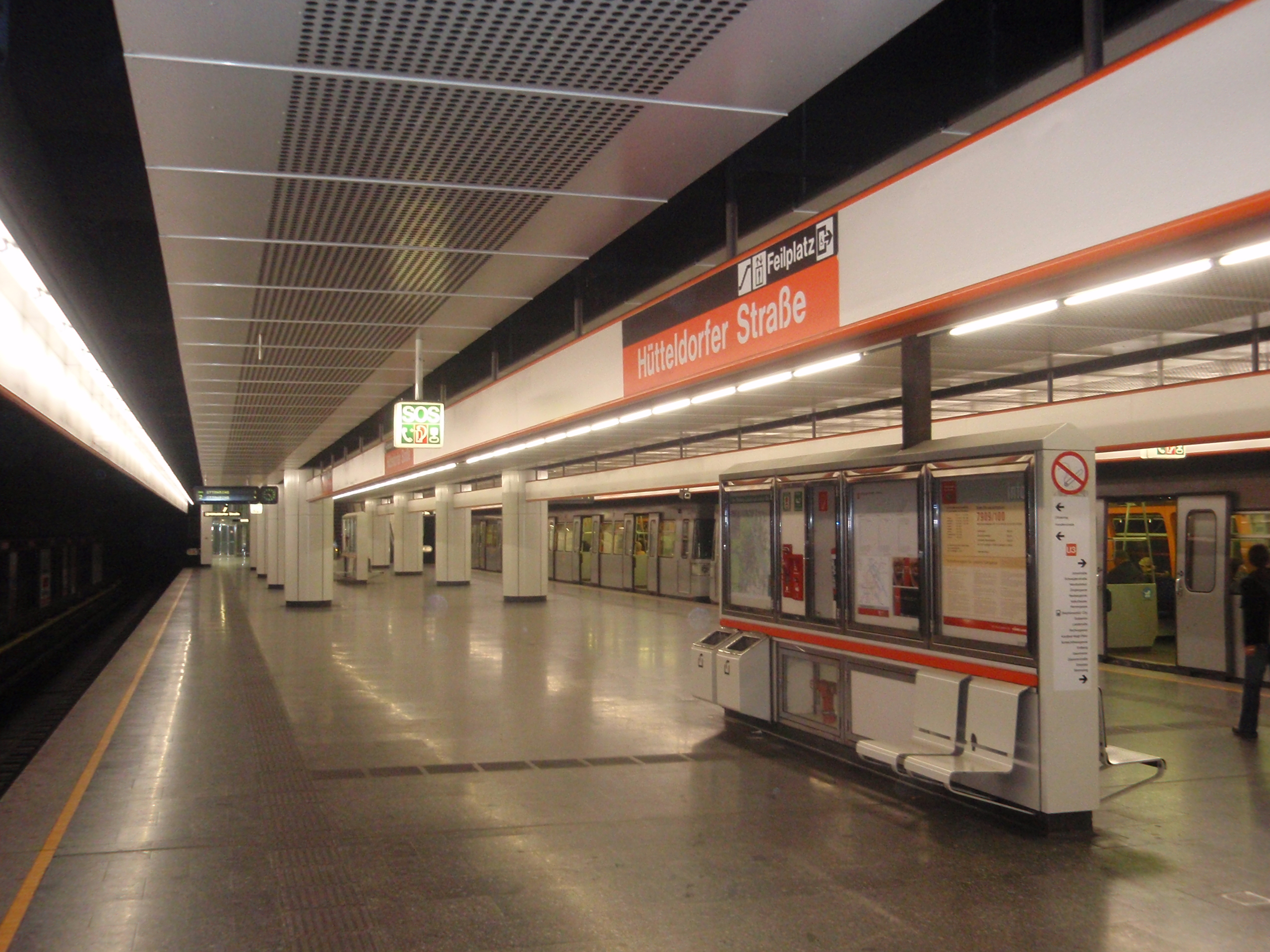

General information
- Location: Penzing, Vienna; Austria
- Coordinates: 48.2002°N 16.3108°E

History
- Opened: 1998

Services
Preceding station	Wiener Linien	Following station
Kendlerstraße toward Ottakring	U3	Johnstraße toward Simmering
Location

Hütteldorfer Straße is a station on U3 of the Vienna U-Bahn. It is located in the Penzing District. It opened in 1998.
