= Westbahnhof station =

Vienna U-Bahn station

Westbahnhof
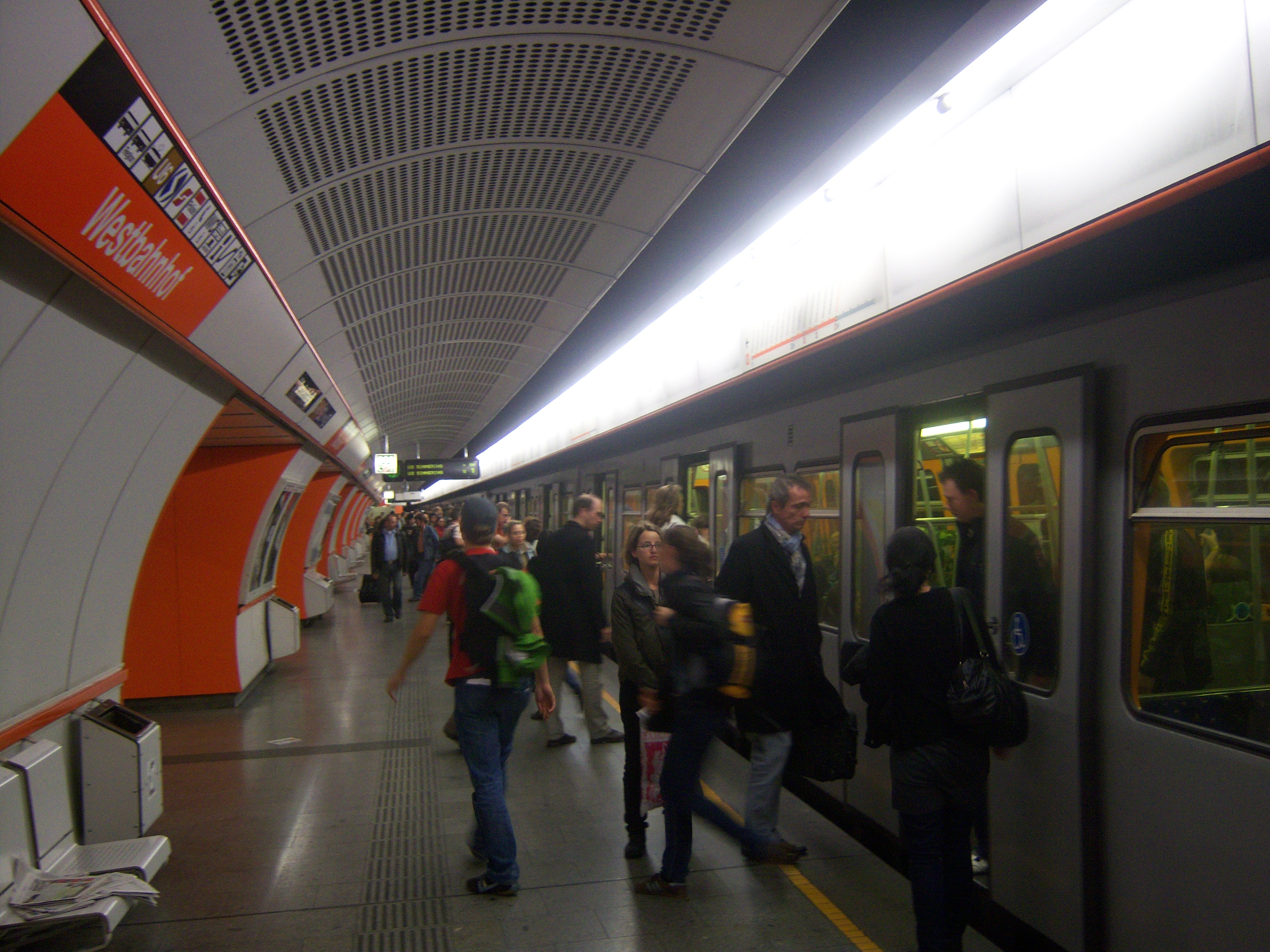
- Line U3 platform

General information
- Location: Rudolfsheim-Fünfhaus, Vienna; Austria
- Coordinates: 48.1970°N 16.3391°E
- System: Vienna U-Bahn rapid transit station

History
- Opened: 1993

Services
Preceding station	Wiener Linien	Following station
Schweglerstraße toward Ottakring	U3	Zieglergasse toward Simmering
Burggasse-Stadthalle toward Floridsdorf	U6	Gumpendorfer Straße toward Siebenhirten
Location

Westbahnhof is a station on U3 and U6 of the Vienna U-Bahn. It is located at the Vienna West railway station, in Rudolfsheim-Fünfhaus District. It opened in 1993.

== Art ==
"Cirka 55 Schritte durch Europa" by Adolf Frohner is found in this station.
