= Zippererstraße station =

Vienna U-Bahn station

Zippererstraße
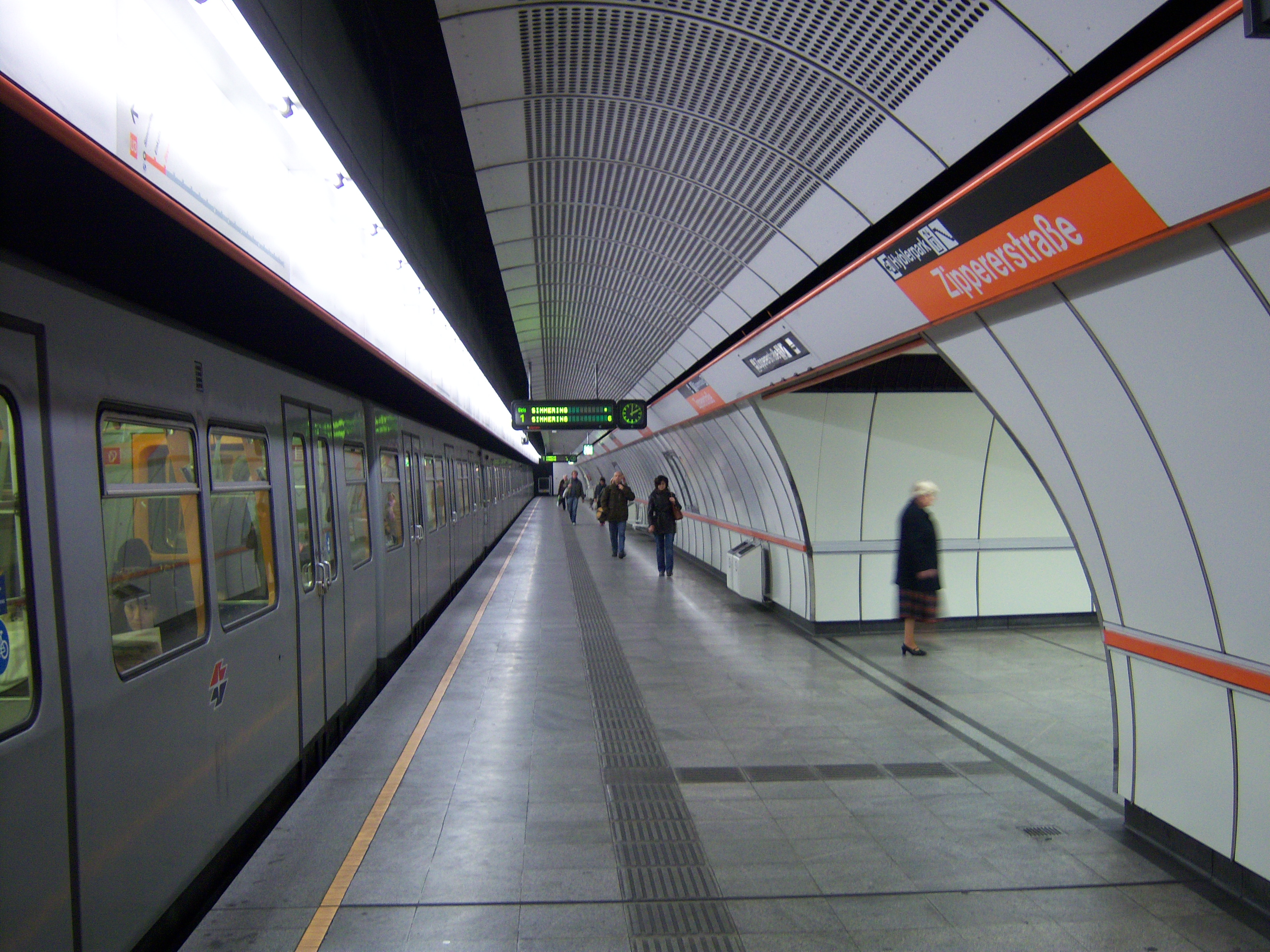

General information
- Location: Simmering, Vienna; Austria
- Coordinates: 48.1796°N 16.4114°E

History
- Opened: 2000

Services
Preceding station	Wiener Linien	Following station
Gasometer toward Ottakring	U3	Enkplatz toward Simmering
Location

Zippererstraße is a station on U3 of the Vienna U-Bahn. It is located in the Simmering District. It opened in 2000.
