= Volkstheater station =

Vienna U-Bahn station

Volkstheater
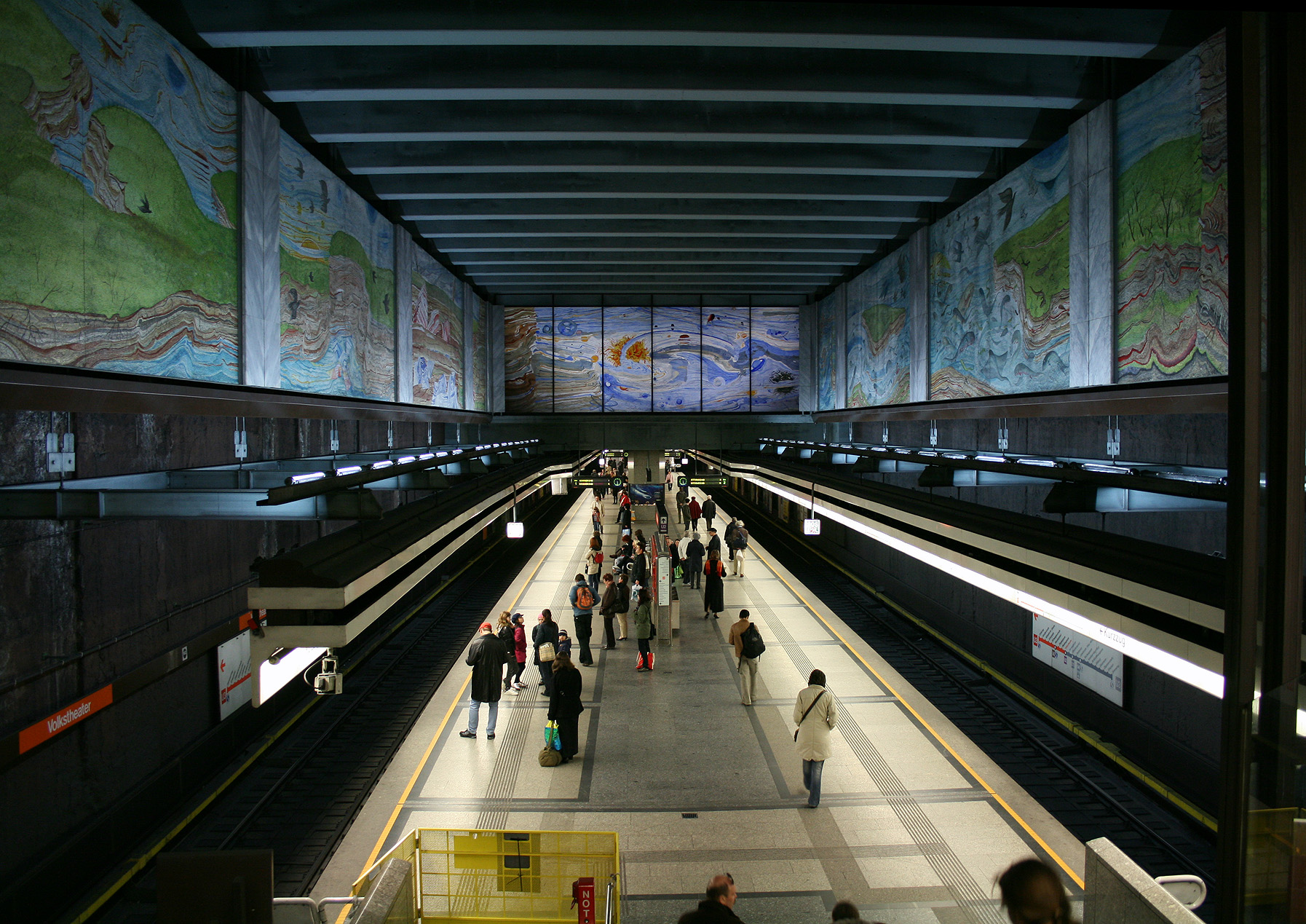
- U3 platform

General information
- Location: Innere Stadt, Vienna; Austria
- Coordinates: 48.2052°N 16.3580°E

History
- Opened: 30 August 1980

Services
Preceding station	Wiener Linien	Following station
Museumsquartier toward Karlsplatz	U2	Rathaus toward Seestadt
Preceding station	Wiener Linien	Following station
Neubaugasse toward Ottakring	U3	Herrengasse toward Simmering
Location

Volkstheater is a station on U3 and U2 of the Vienna U-Bahn. It is located in the Innere Stadt District. It opened in 1980.

The U2 part of the station was closed between 2020 and late 2024 to install platform screen doors. It is expected to be overtaken by the new U5 line soon.

== Art ==
"Das Werden der Natur" by Anton Lehmden is found in this station.
