= Schweglerstraße station =

Vienna U-Bahn station

Schweglerstraße
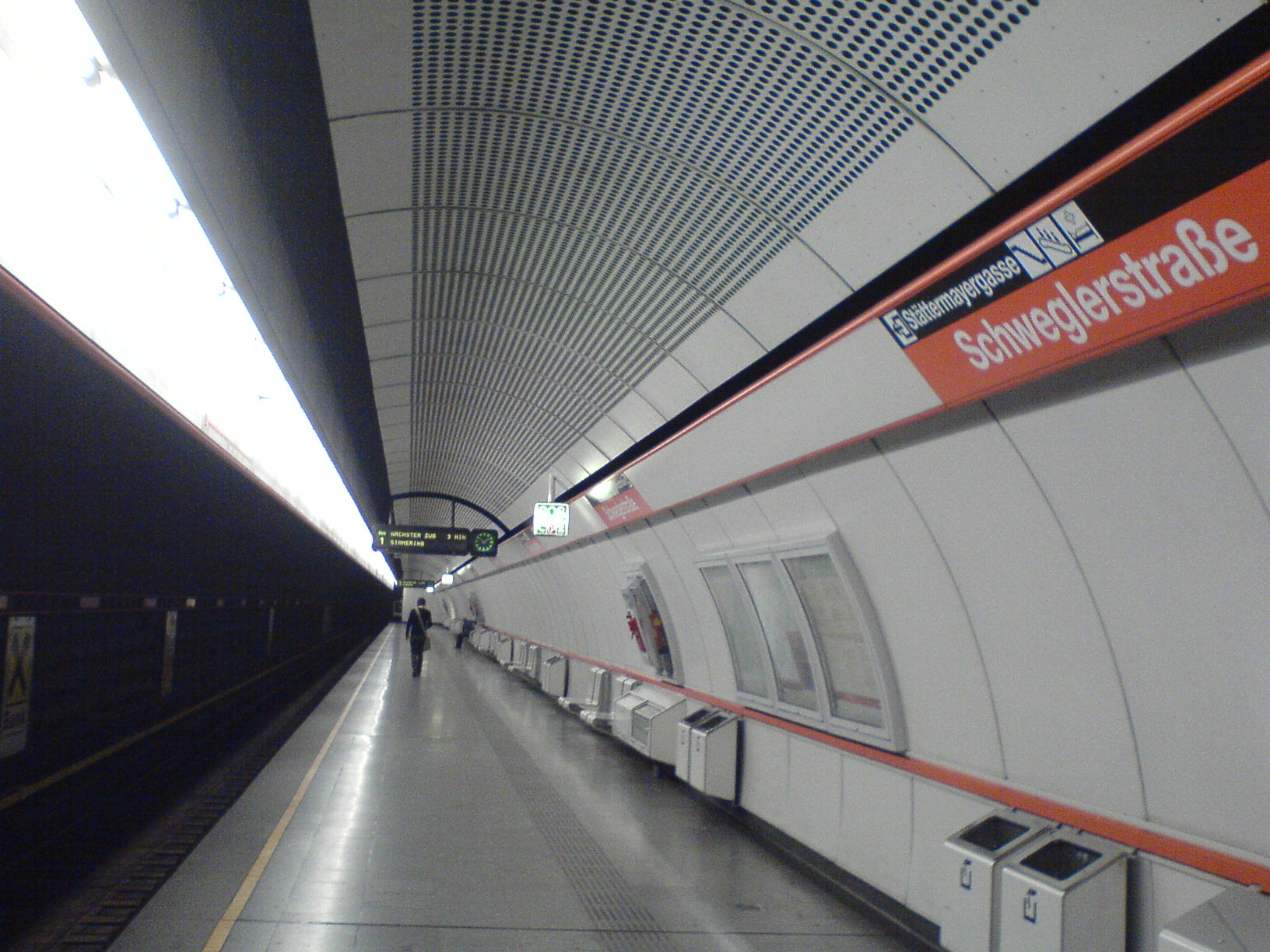

General information
- Location: Rudolfsheim-Fünfhaus, Vienna; Austria
- Coordinates: 48.1982°N 16.3287°E

History
- Opened: 1994

Services
Preceding station	Wiener Linien	Following station
Johnstraße toward Ottakring	U3	Westbahnhof toward Simmering
Location

Schweglerstraße is a station on U3 of the Vienna U-Bahn. It is located in the Rudolfsheim-Fünfhaus District. It opened in 1994.

== Art ==
The art installation Tele-Archäologie by Nam June Paik is located in this station.
