= Schlachthausgasse station =

Vienna U-Bahn station

Schlachthausgasse
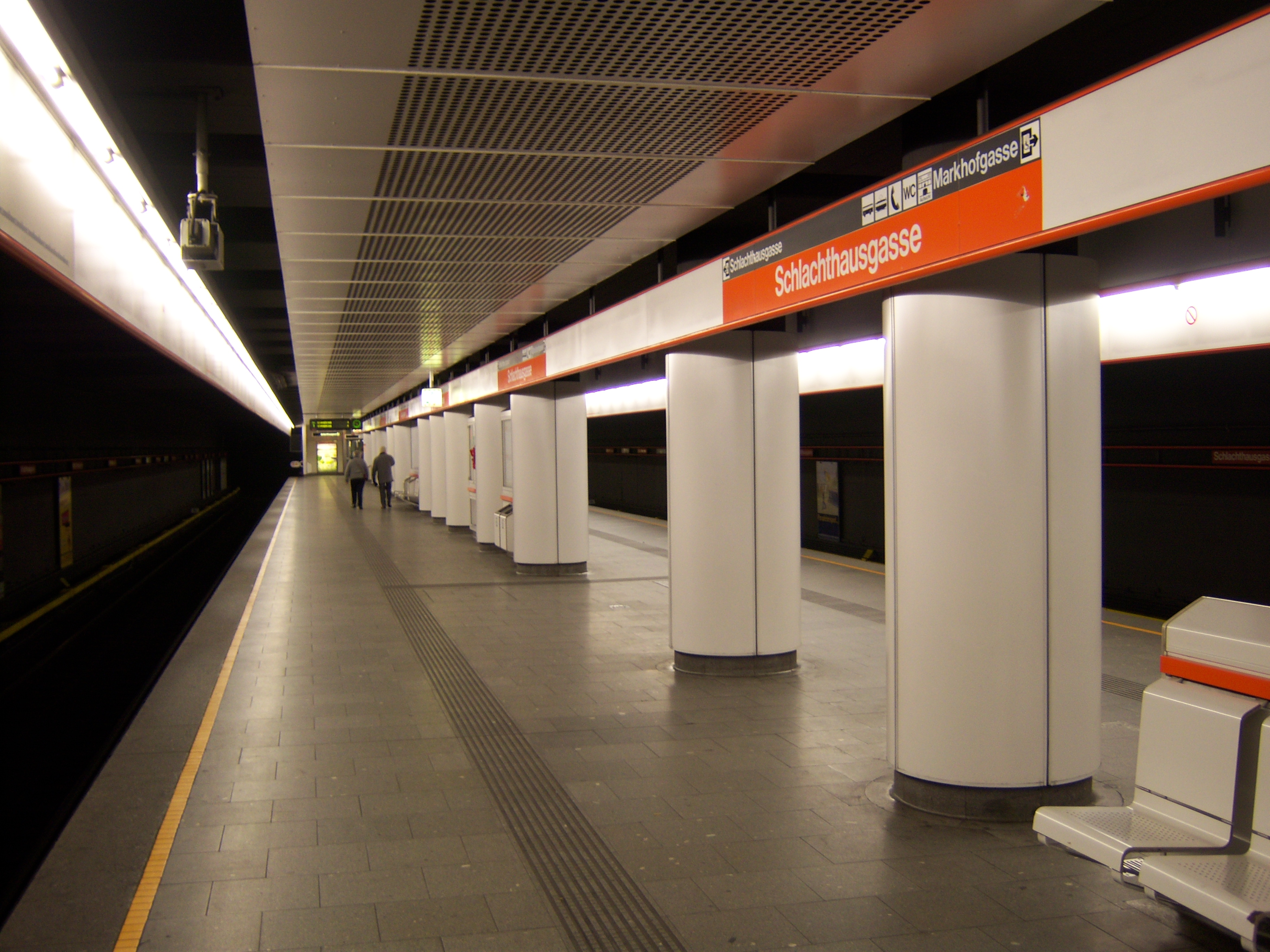

General information
- Location: Landstraße, Vienna; Austria
- Coordinates: 48.1941°N 16.4075°E

History
- Opened: 6 April 1991

Services
Preceding station	Wiener Linien	Following station
Kardinal-Nagl-Platz toward Ottakring	U3	Erdberg toward Simmering
Location

Schlachthausgasse is a station on U3 of the Vienna U-Bahn. It is located in the Landstraße District. It opened in 1991.
