= Kardinal-Nagl-Platz station =

Vienna U-Bahn station

Kardinal-Nagl-Platz
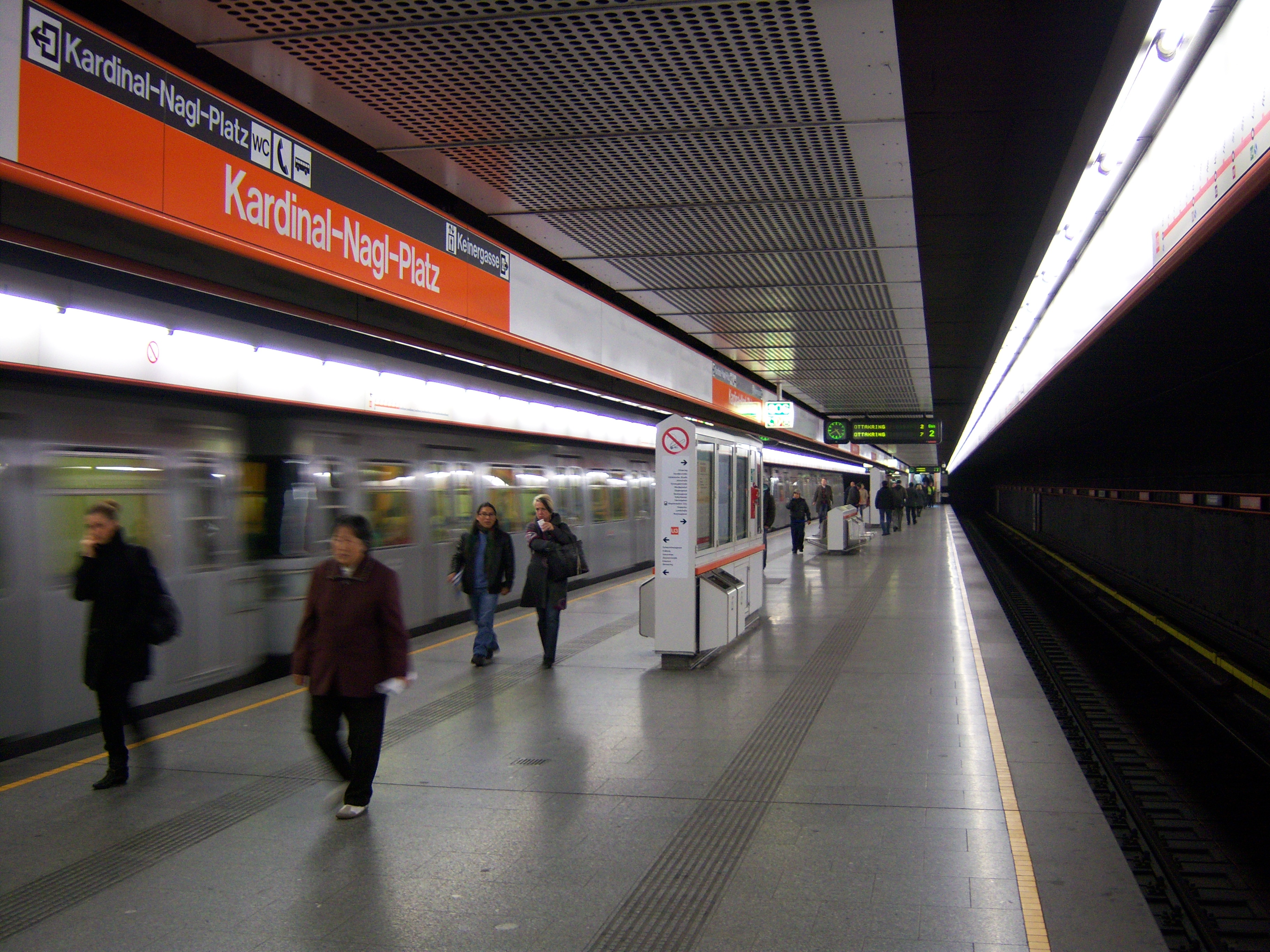

General information
- Location: Landstraße, Vienna; Austria
- Coordinates: 48.1971°N 16.4007°E

History
- Opened: 6 April 1991

Services
| Preceding station | Wiener Linien | Following station |
|---|---|---|
| Rochusgasse toward Ottakring | U3 | Schlachthausgasse toward Simmering |
Location

Kardinal-Nagl-Platz is a station on U3 of the Vienna U-Bahn. It is located in the Landstraße District. It opened in 1991.
