= Gasometer station =

Vienna U-Bahn station

Gasometer
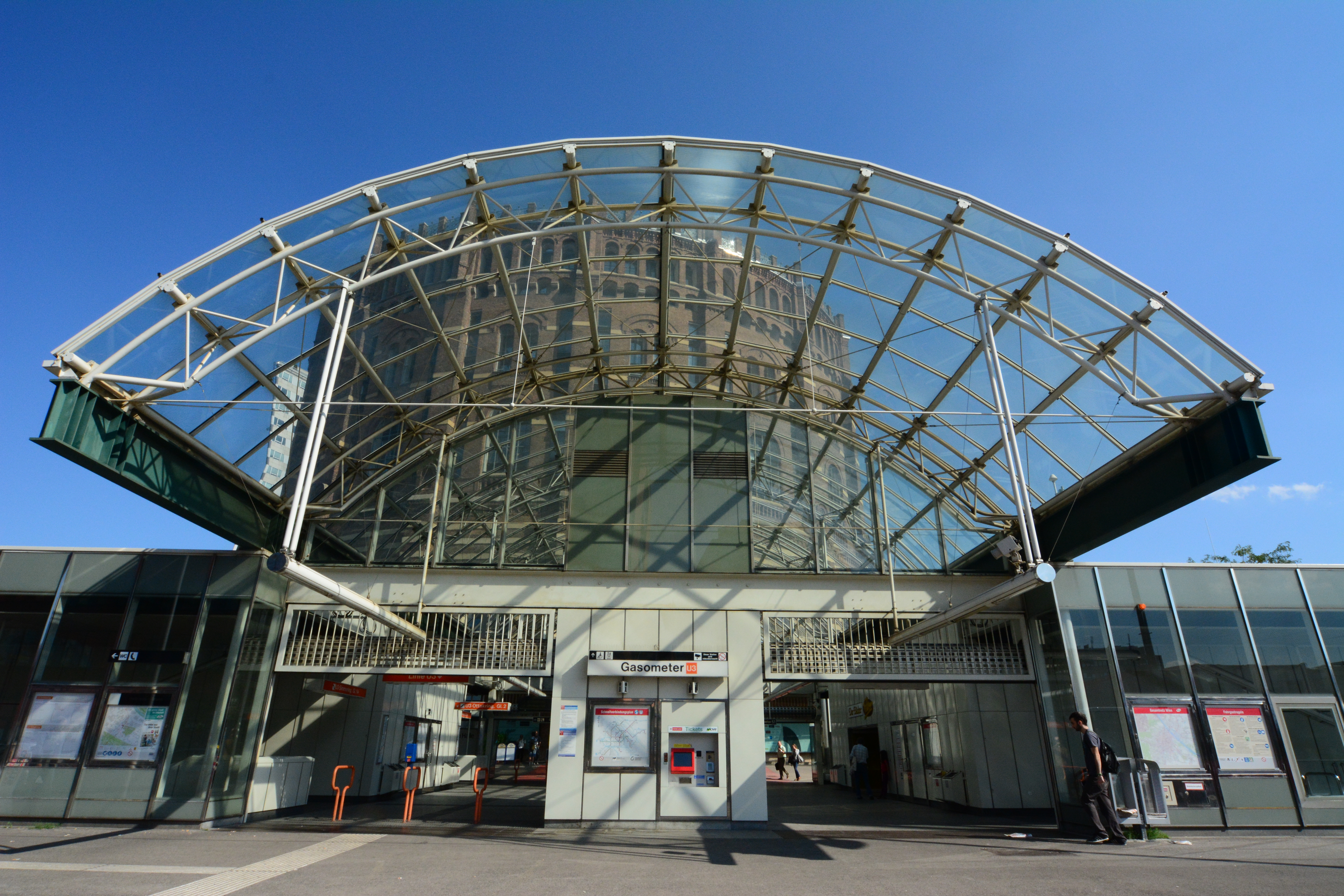

General information
- Location: Simmering, Vienna; Austria
- Coordinates: 48.1853°N 16.4176°E

History
- Opened: 2000

Services
Preceding station	Wiener Linien	Following station
Erdberg toward Ottakring	U3	Zippererstraße toward Simmering
Location

Gasometer is a station on U3 of the Vienna U-Bahn. It is located in the Simmering District. It opened in 2000.
