= Rochusgasse station =

Vienna U-Bahn station

Rochusgasse
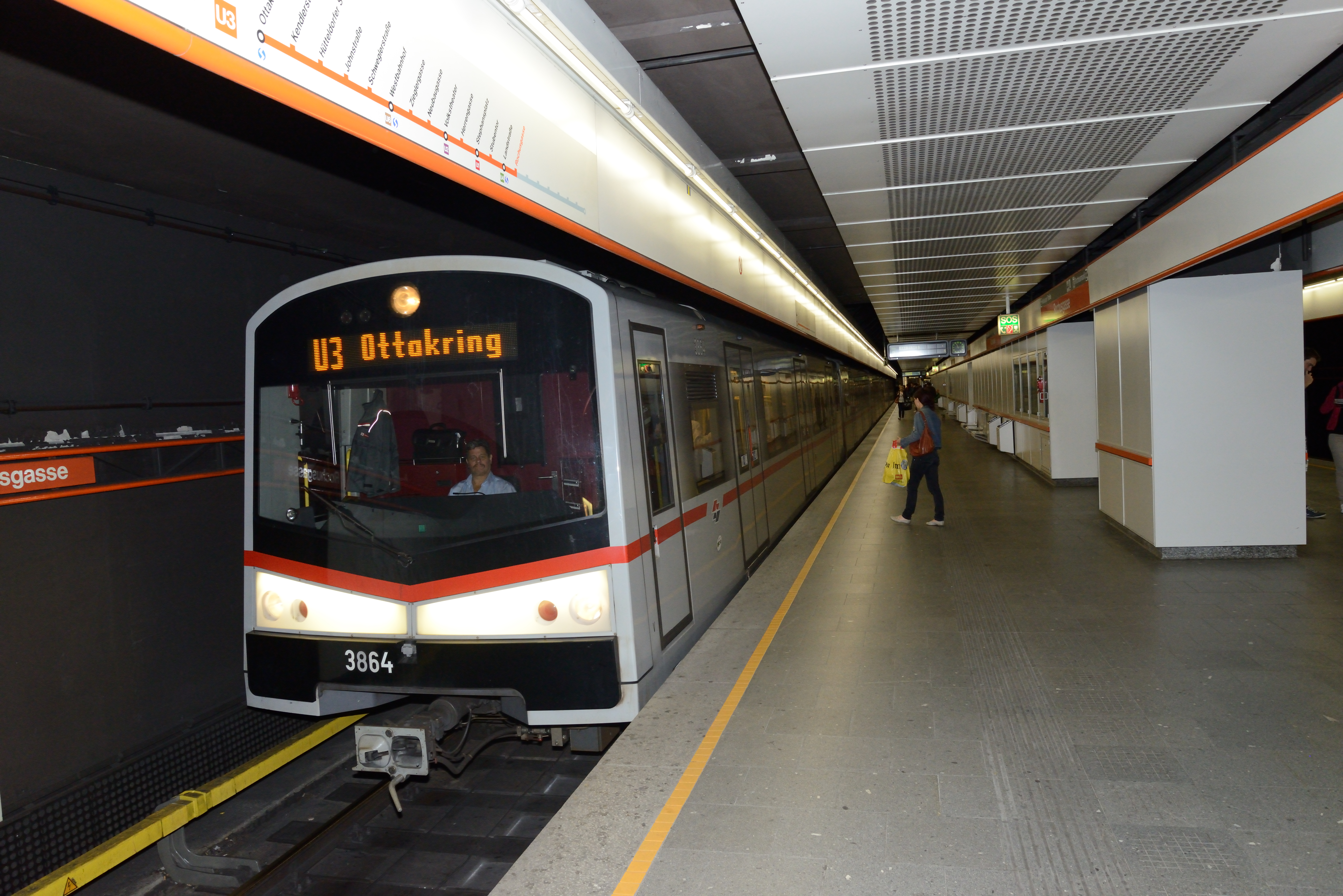

General information
- Location: Landstraße, Vienna; Austria
- Coordinates: 48.2027°N 16.3912°E

History
- Opened: 6 April 1991

Services
Preceding station	Wiener Linien	Following station
Landstraße toward Ottakring	U3	Kardinal-Nagl-Platz toward Simmering
Location

Rochusgasse is a station on U3 of the Vienna U-Bahn. It is located in the Landstraße District. It opened in 1991.
