= Stephansplatz station (Vienna U-Bahn) =

Vienna U-Bahn station

Coordinates: 48°12′29″N 16°22′18″E

Stephansplatz
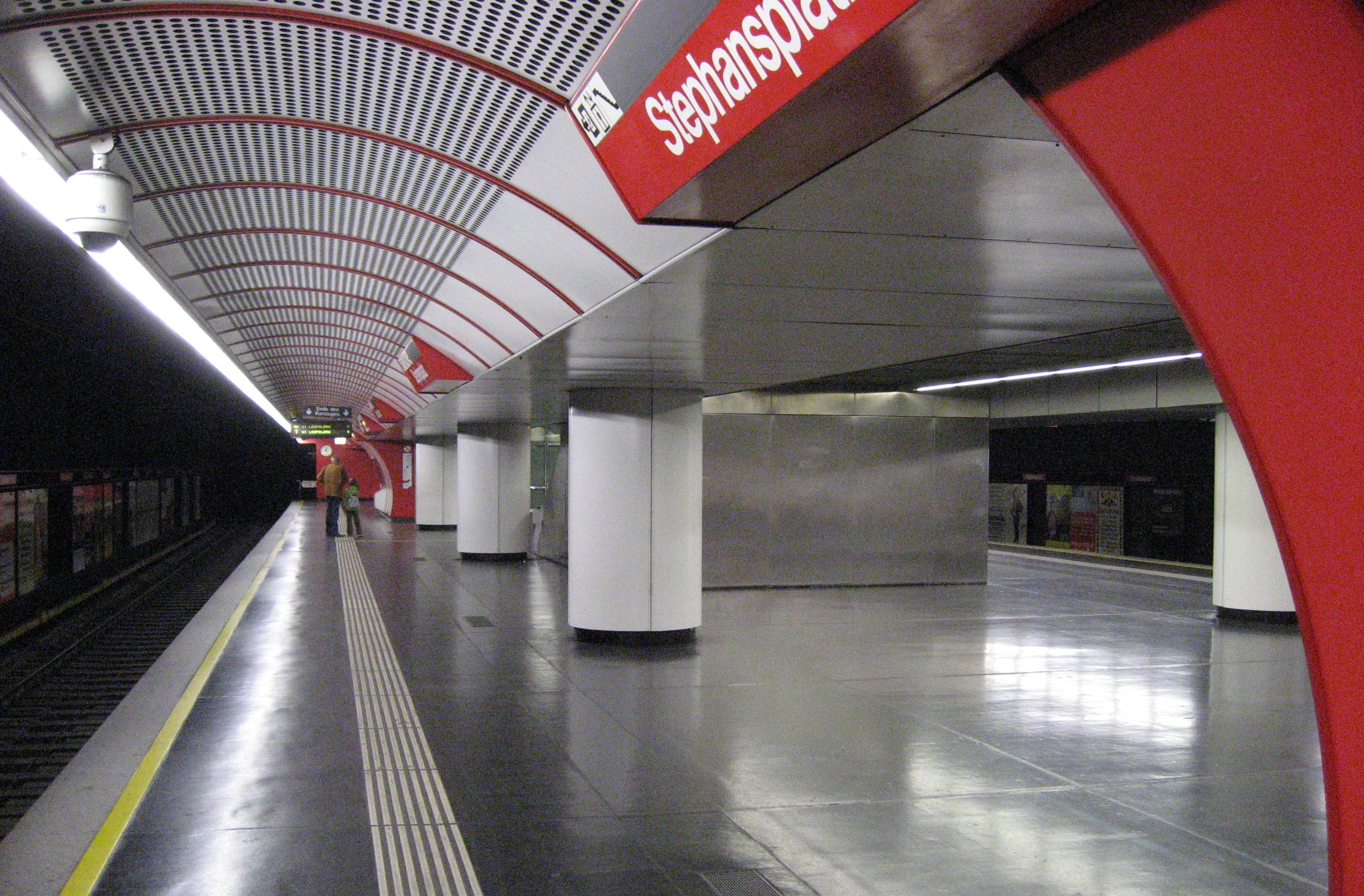
- U1 platform

General information
- Location: Stephansplatz, Vienna; Austria
- Owner: Wiener Linien
- Lines: and
- Platforms: 1 island platform (U1) and 2 single platforms one above the other (U3).
- Tracks: 4

Construction
- Accessible: Yes

History
- Opened: 25 February 1978

Services
Preceding station	Wiener Linien	Following station
Karlsplatz toward Oberlaa	U1	Schwedenplatz toward Leopoldau
Herrengasse toward Ottakring	U3	Stubentor toward Simmering
Location

Stephansplatz is an important destination and interchange station in the Vienna U-Bahn system. It is located under the Stephansplatz and is served by lines U1 and U3. It is located in the Innere Stadt district.

Stephansplatz station opened on 18 November 1978. Designated officially as the central node of the U-Bahn by City in on-train announcements and on network maps by a pictogram of its namesake, the Stephansdom, the station serves the heart of the Altstadt and connects two of the busiest lines, making it one of the busiest stations in the city. The U1 between it and Karlsplatz has the highest ridership in the system: approximately 167,000 riders per day in 2004.

== Station layout ==
The U-Bahn platforms lie up to five storeys below the Stephansplatz. Station entrances are located in the square, in the Graben, in Kärntner Straße and in Goldschmiedegasse. To preserve the streetscape, they are not covered. The Goldschmiedegasse entrance is via a lift on the outside of the Haas-Haus and is wheelchair-accessible. The remaining entrances have escalators and stairs. There are a total of 23 escalators of varying lengths, and 3 additional lifts within the station.

The U1 runs deeper underground and has an island platform; the two U3 platforms are single platforms stacked above each other. An information kiosk and a Wiener Linien ticket purchase outlet are located on the upper level of the station. In addition, two Viennese bakery brands have stores within the station complex. Until its relocation in 2005, there was also a police station.

== History ==
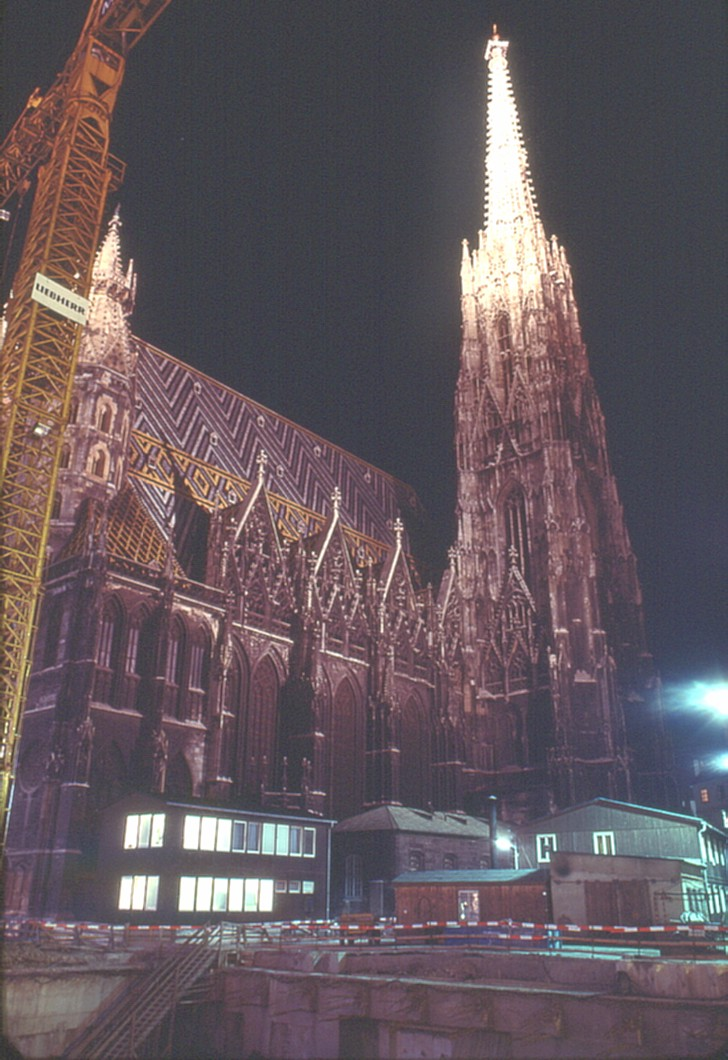
Night view of excavations for the station in front of St. Stephen's Cathedral, June 1975

Adequate public transport service to the Innere Stadt within the Ringstraße had been a long-term need in Vienna. As early as the 19th century, plans had been proposed for a central station immediately next to St. Stephen's Cathedral. The Palais Equitable, built in 1887–91 for The Equitable Life Assurance Society of the United States on the adjacent Stock-im-Eisen Platz, actually has a covered stairway that was intended to be adaptable as an U-Bahn access.

Construction of the Stephansplatz station began as part of the creation of the basic network (Grundnetz) in May 1973. Deep excavation at the site was completed in August 1977 and construction of the station then proceeded largely in an open pit. The U3 connection was planned from the beginning and prepared for as part of the work in the 1970s, but that part of the station only opened in 1991.

In the course of digging in front of the cathedral in 1973, the Vergilius Chapel, closed off in the 18th century and completely forgotten, was rediscovered. It was excavated by archaeologists and integrated into the station.

== Smell ==
The U1 station has an unpleasant smell which has given rise to urban legends. However, the true cause is that to prevent the sandy ground under the cathedral from sinking and undermining it, an organic binding agent was used to stabilise the ground. On warm days, a chemical reaction caused by the binding agent produces butyric acid, which mingles with seeping groundwater and causes the unpleasant odour and also leaves deposits in the station.

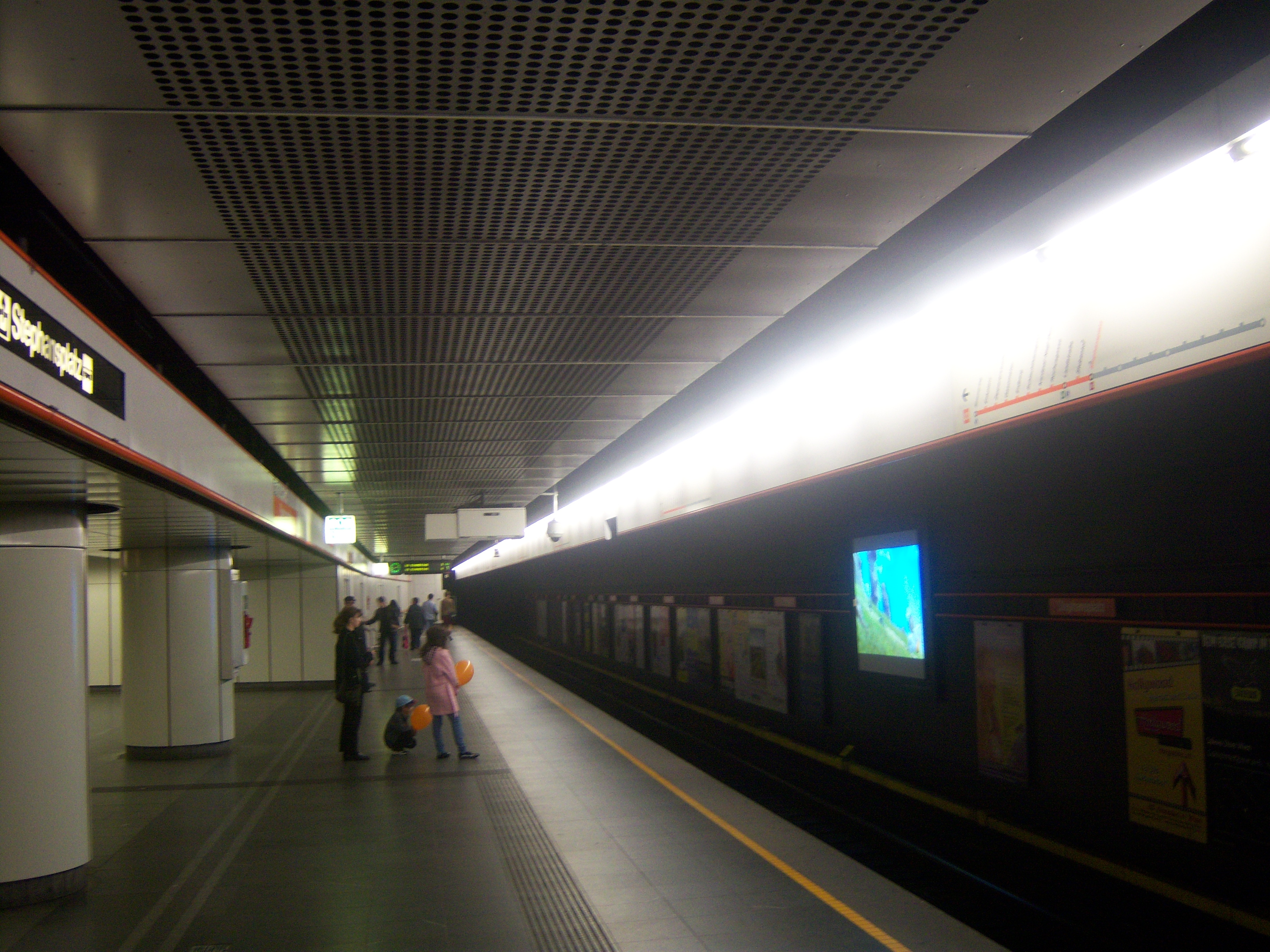
U3 platform

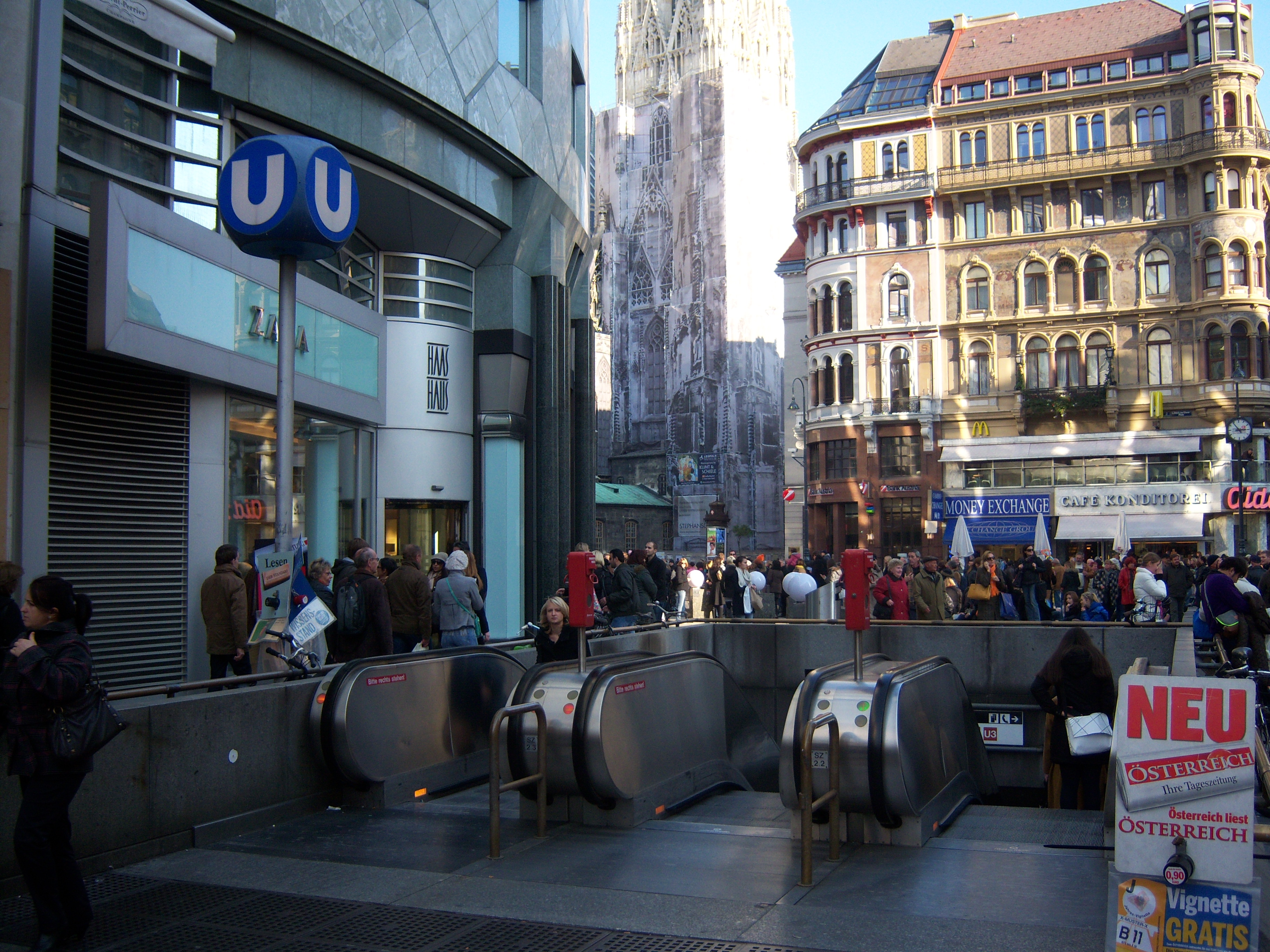
Station entrance in front of Haas-Haus with St. Stephen's in the background
