= Erdberg station =

Vienna U-Bahn station

Erdberg
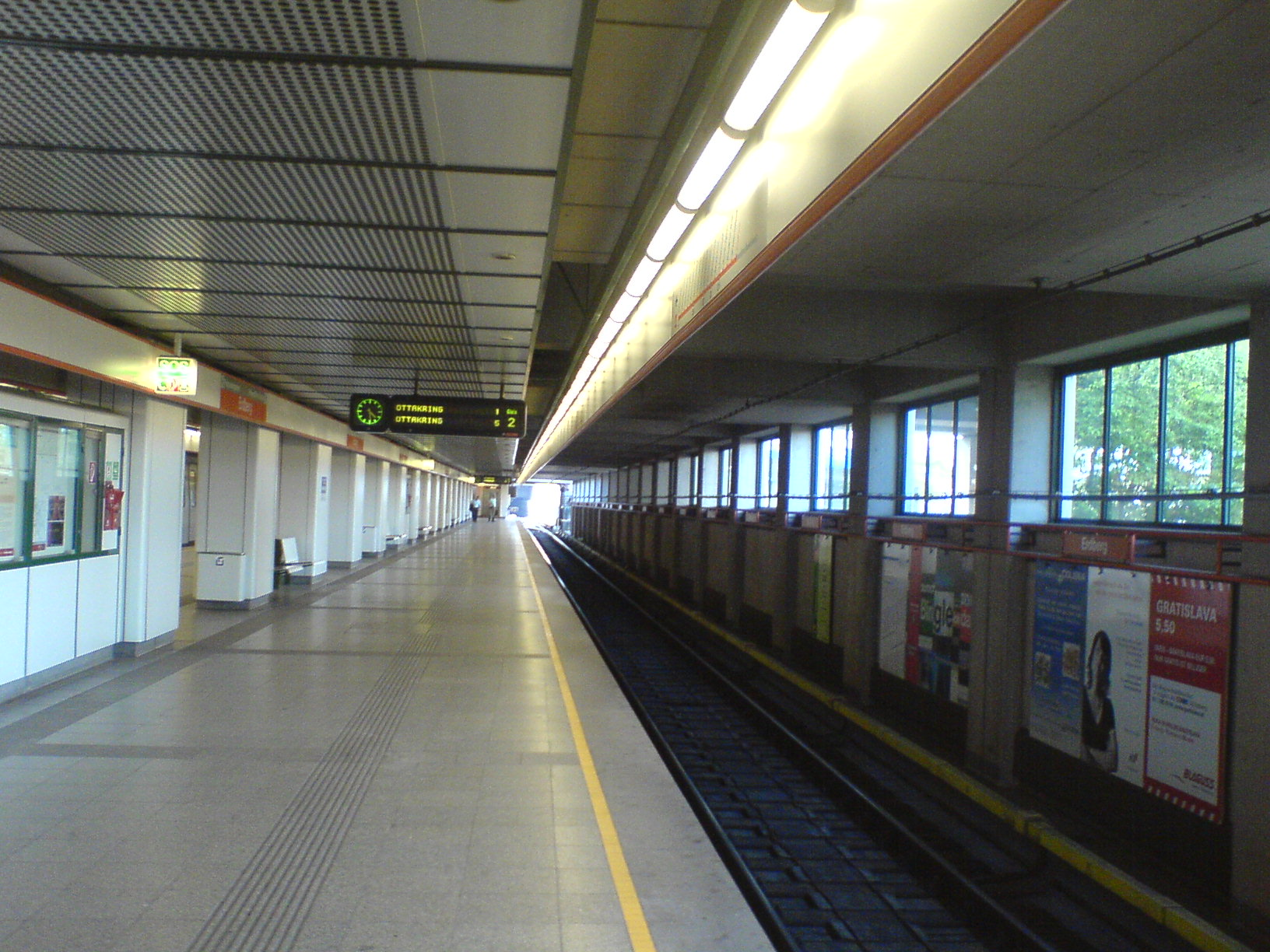

General information
- Location: Landstraße, Vienna; Austria
- Coordinates: 48.1909°N 16.4149°E
- Line: N75 Coachbus P+R

History
- Opened: 6 April 1991

Services
Preceding station	Wiener Linien	Following station
Schlachthausgasse toward Ottakring	U3	Gasometer toward Simmering
Location

Erdberg is a station on U3 of the Vienna U-Bahn. It is located in the Landstraße District. It opened in 1991.
