= Zieglergasse station =

Vienna U-Bahn station

Zieglergasse
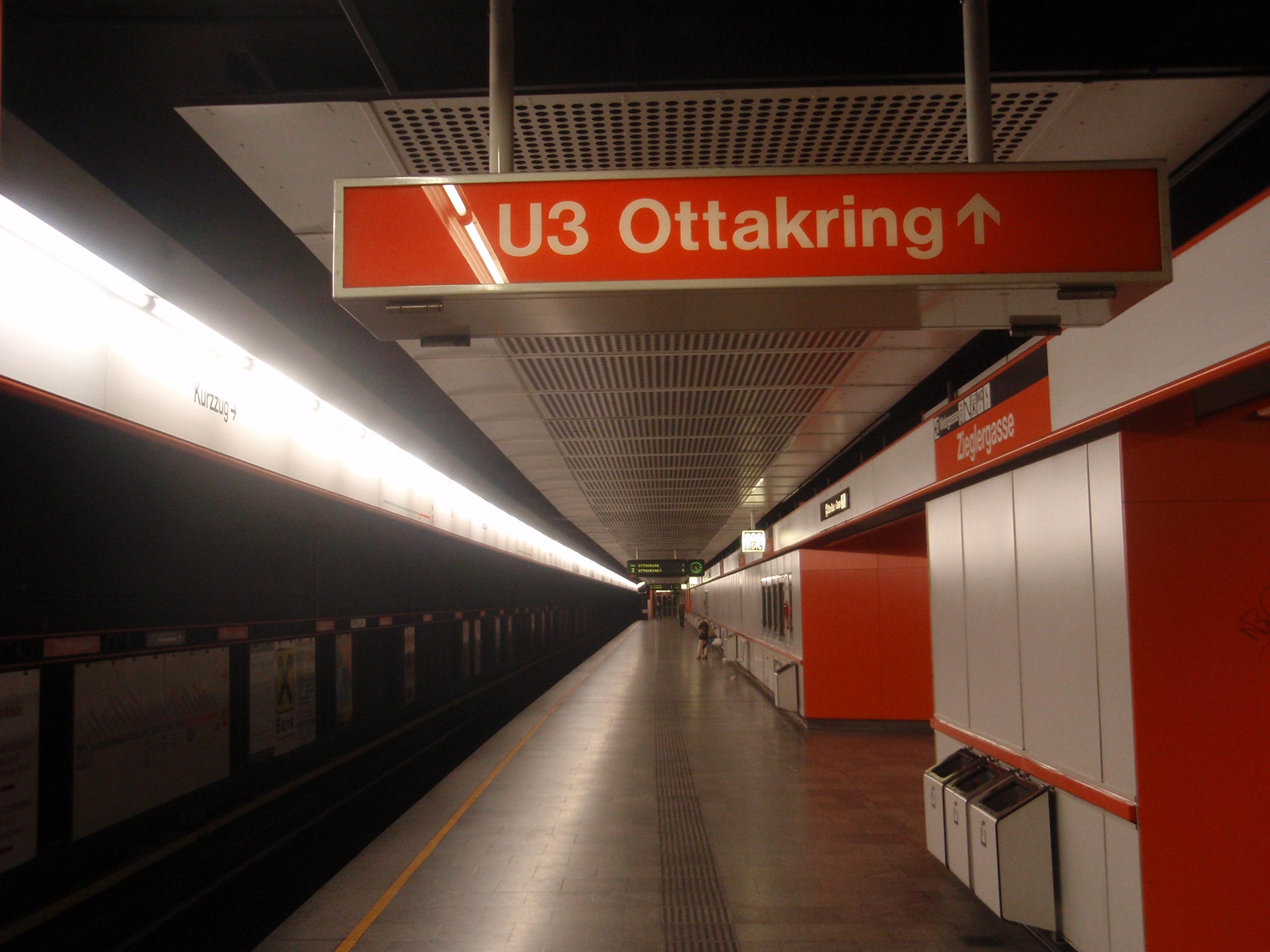

General information
- Location: Mariahilf, Vienna; Austria
- Coordinates: 48.1971°N 16.3459°E

History
- Opened: 1993

Services
Preceding station	Wiener Linien	Following station
Westbahnhof toward Ottakring	U3	Neubaugasse toward Simmering
Location

Zieglergasse is a station on U3 of the Vienna U-Bahn. It is located in the Mariahilf District. It opened in 1993. In this station, the two platforms are not on the same level: the platform for trains bound for Simmering is above, and the platform for trains bound for Ottakring is below.
