= Enkplatz station =

Vienna U-Bahn station

Enkplatz
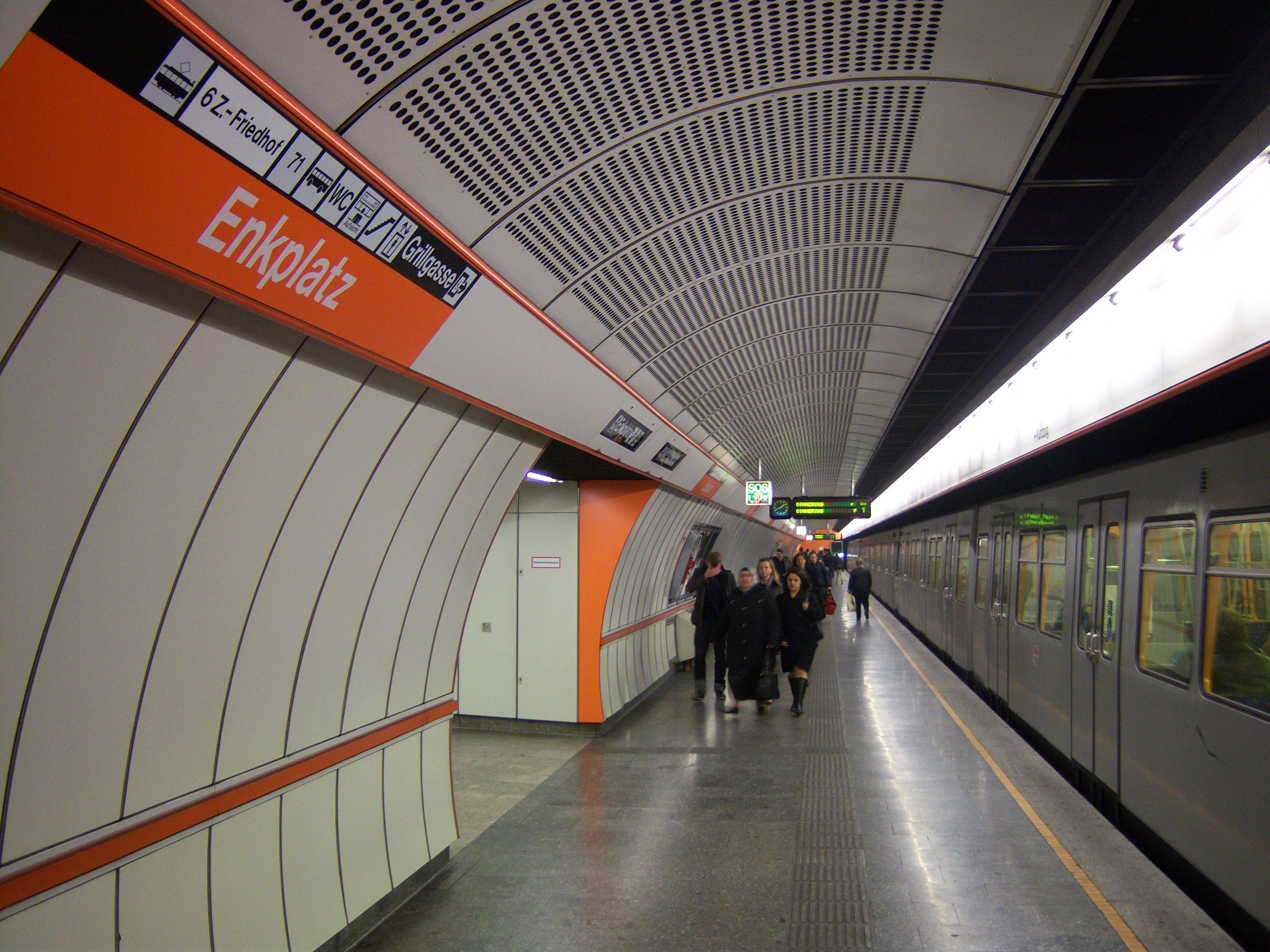

General information
- Location: Simmering, Vienna; Austria
- Coordinates: 48.1760°N 16.4141°E

History
- Opened: 2000

Services
Preceding station	Wiener Linien	Following station
Zippererstraße toward Ottakring	U3	Simmering Terminus
Location

Enkplatz is a station on U3 of the Vienna U-Bahn. It is located in the Simmering District. It opened in 2000.
