= Kendlerstraße station =

Vienna U-Bahn station

Kendlerstraße
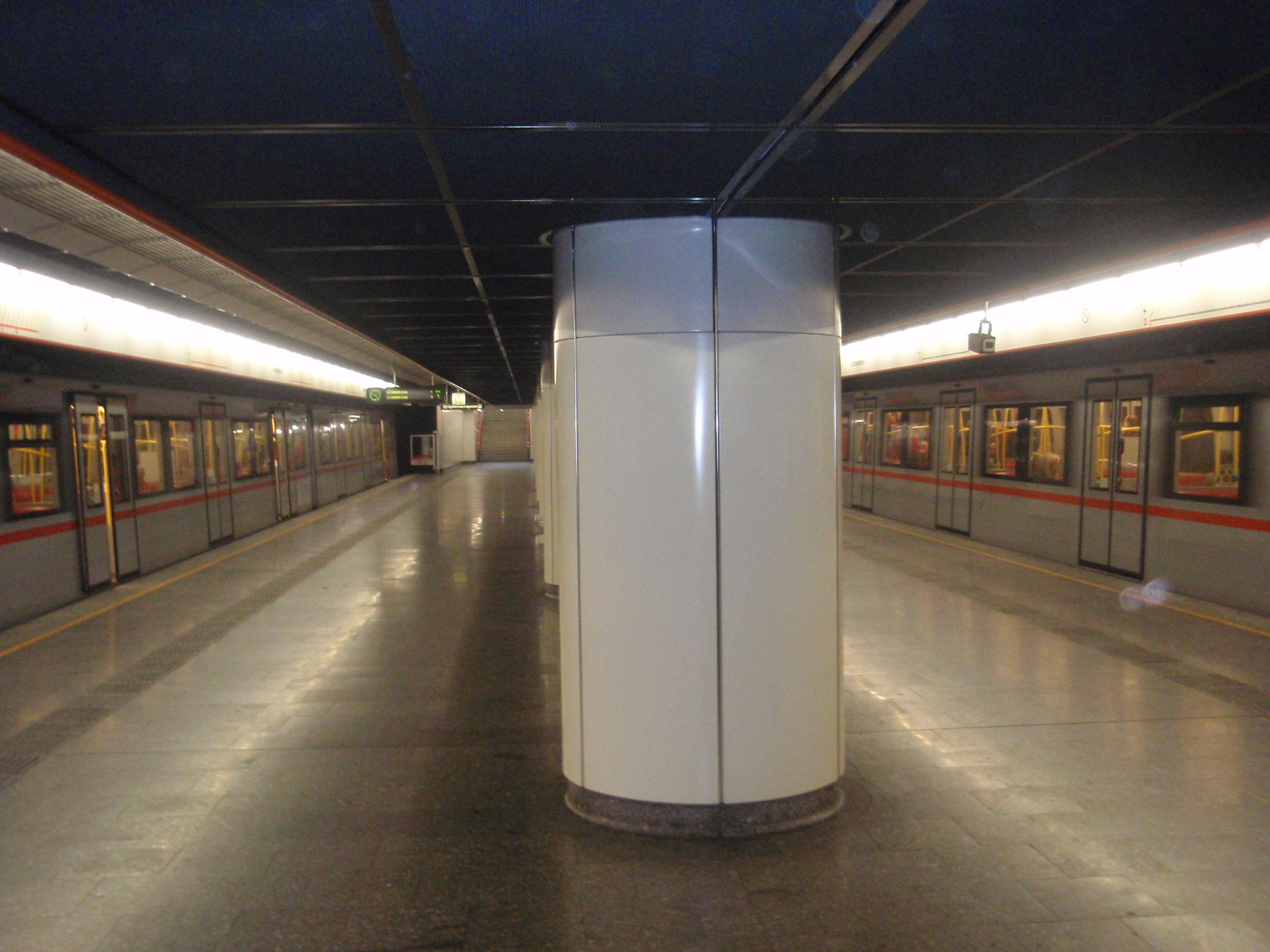

General information
- Location: Ottakring, Vienna; Austria
- Coordinates: 48.2053°N 16.3094°E

History
- Opened: 1998

Services
Preceding station	Wiener Linien	Following station
Ottakring Terminus	U3	Hütteldorfer Straße toward Simmering
Location

Kendlerstraße is a station on U3 of the Vienna U-Bahn. It is located in the Ottakring District. It opened in 1998.
