= Herrengasse station =

Vienna U-Bahn station

Herrengasse
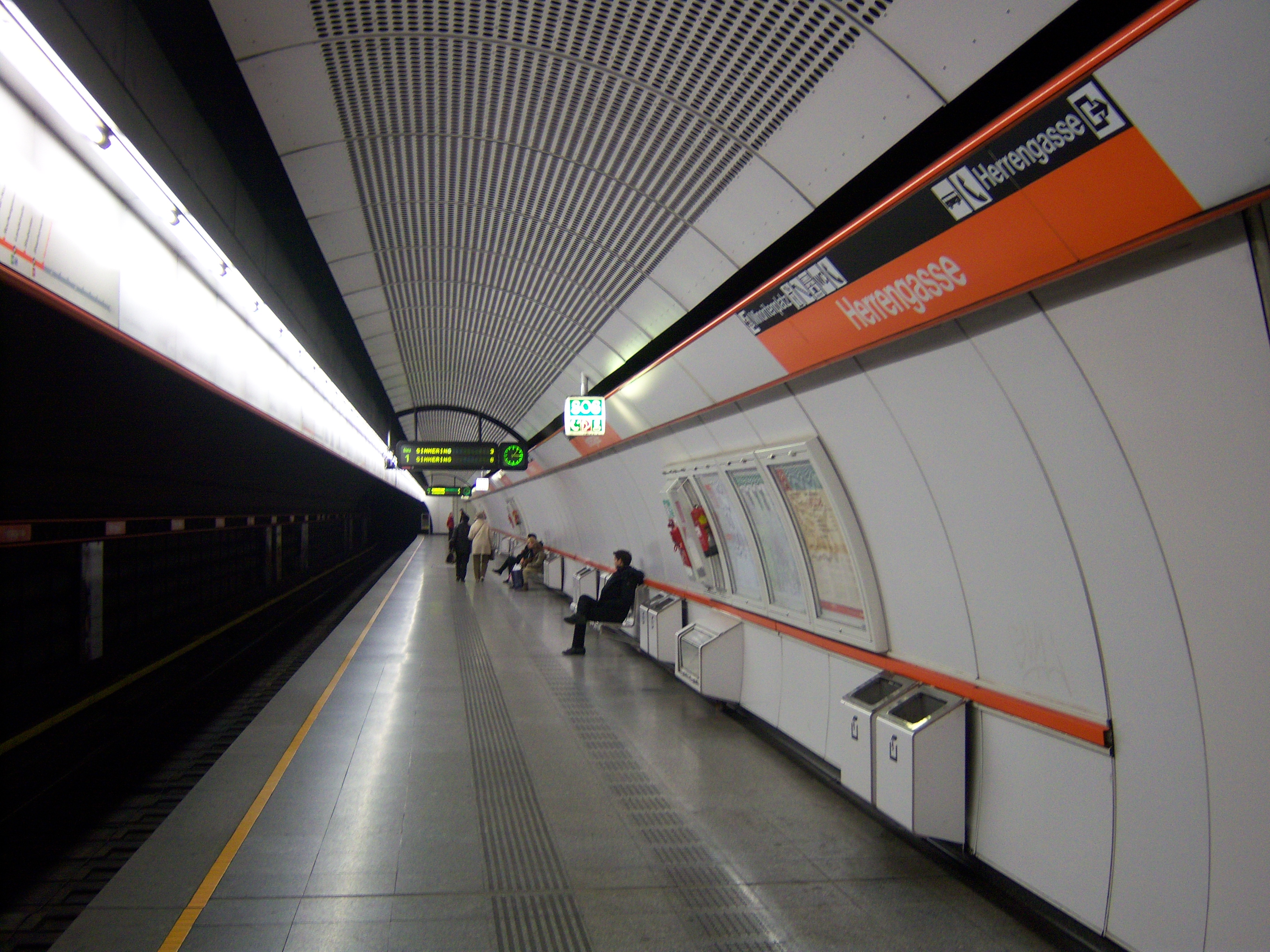

General information
- Location: Innere Stadt, Vienna; Austria
- Coordinates: 48.2093°N 16.3655°E

History
- Opened: 6 April 1991

Services
Preceding station	Wiener Linien	Following station
Volkstheater toward Ottakring	U3	Stephansplatz toward Simmering
Location

Herrengasse is a station on U3 of the Vienna U-Bahn. It is located in the Innere Stadt District. It opened in 1991.
