= Stubentor station =

Vienna U-Bahn station

Stubentor
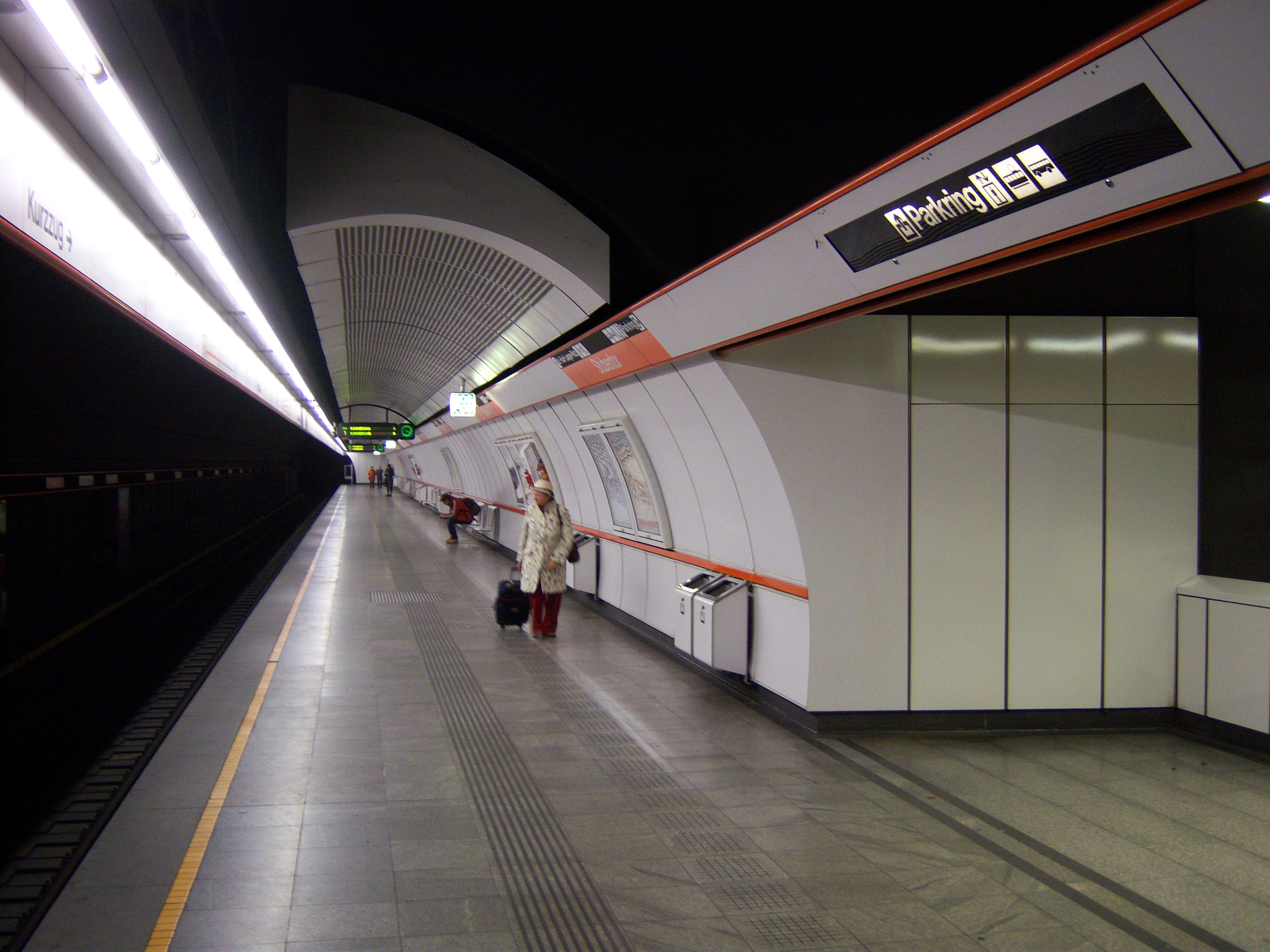

General information
- Location: Innere Stadt, Vienna; Austria
- Coordinates: 48.2071°N 16.3801°E

History
- Opened: 6 April 1991

Services
Preceding station	Wiener Linien	Following station
Stephansplatz toward Ottakring	U3	Landstraße toward Simmering
Location

Stubentor is a station on U3 of the Vienna U-Bahn. It was inaugurated in 1991 and is located in the Innere Stadt District. The station was named after the city gate located in the area up until 1858. Some relics of this gate, such as the remains of the old structures of the city walls, can be seen in the metro station. Stubentor is a three-story station, two tubes of Line U3 lined up on separate levels. The platform for trains bound for Simmering is above, and the platform for trains bound for Ottakring is below.
