= Neubaugasse station =

Vienna U-Bahn station

Neubaugasse
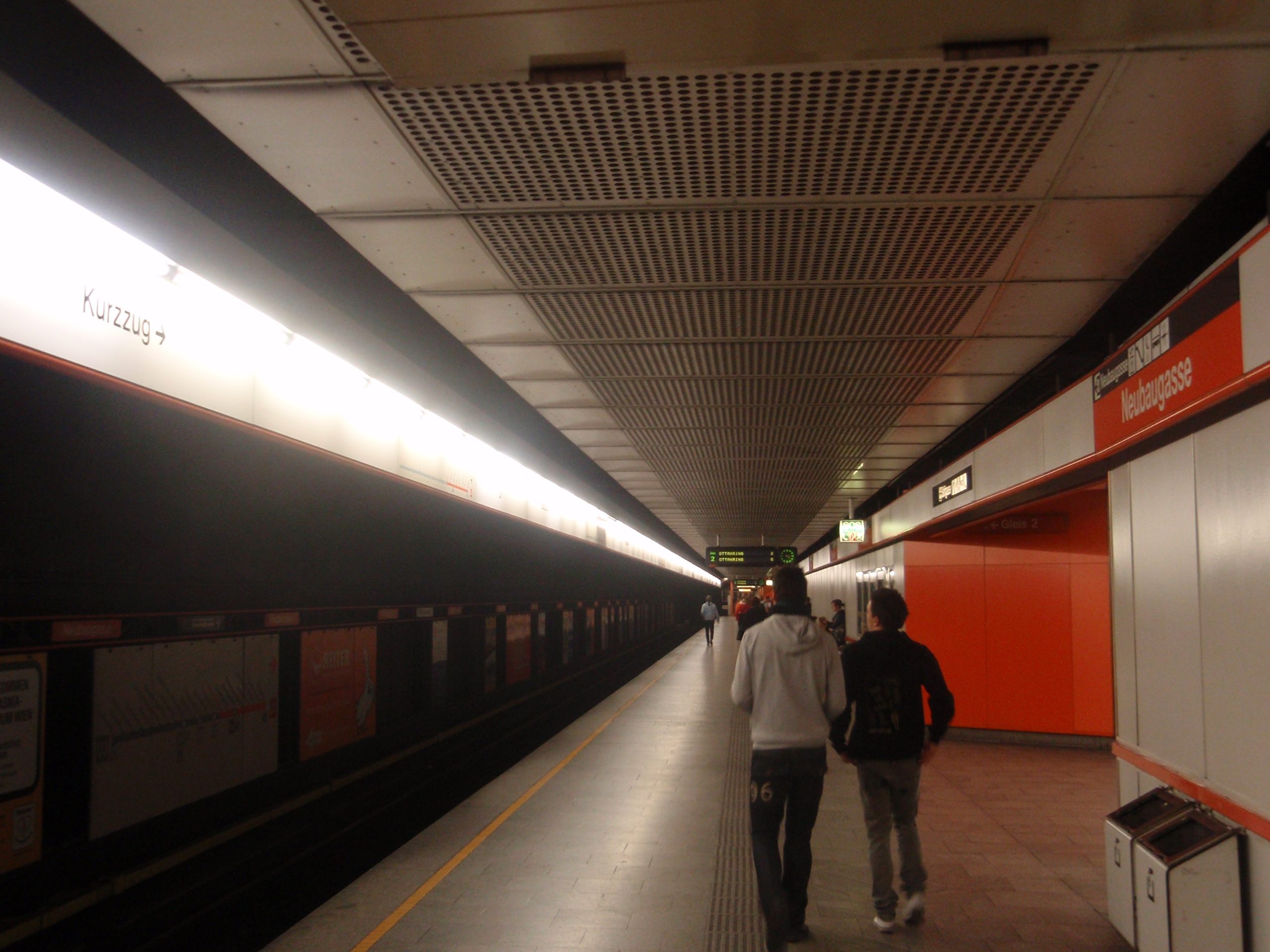

General information
- Location: Neubau, Vienna; Austria
- Coordinates: 48.1984°N 16.3504°E

History
- Opened: 1993

Services
Preceding station	Wiener Linien	Following station
Zieglergasse toward Ottakring	U3	Volkstheater toward Simmering
Location

Neubaugasse is a station on U3 of the Vienna U-Bahn. It is located in the Neubau District. It opened in 1993. In this station, the two platforms are not on the same level: the platform for trains bound for Simmering is above, and the platform for trains bound for Ottakring is below.
