= Erdberg =

Erdberg may refer to:

- Erdberg, Vienna, a neighbourhood
- Erdberg (Vienna U-Bahn), a station on line U3
- Erdberg, the German name of the Czech village of Hrádek (Znojmo District)
