= U3 (Vienna U-Bahn) =

Metro line in Vienna

Line U3 U-Bahn-Linie U3
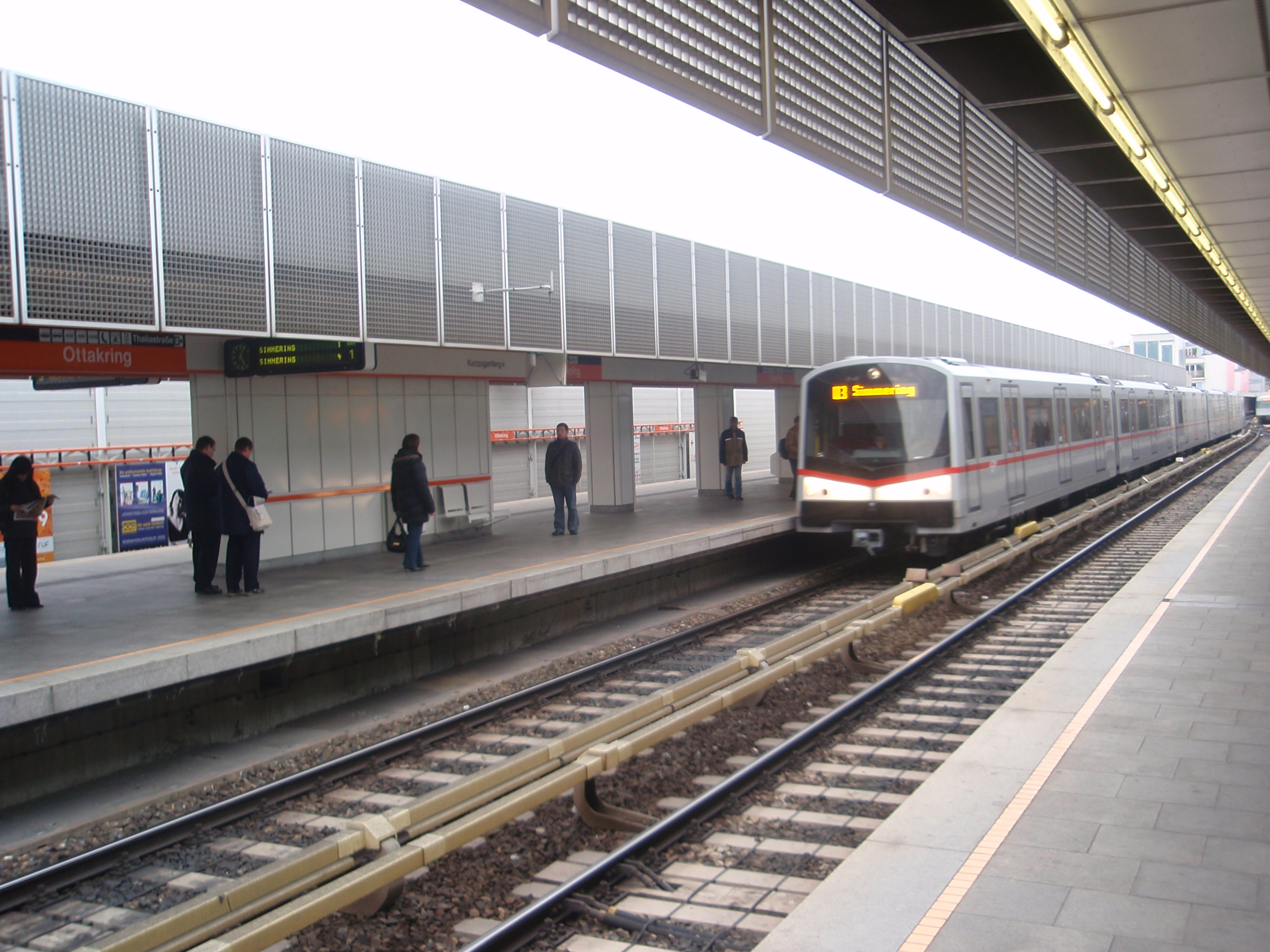
- Line U3 train at Ottakring

Overview
- Status: Operational
- Termini: Ottakring; Simmering
- Stations: 21

Service
- Type: Rapid transit
- System: Vienna U-Bahn
- Operator(s): Wiener Linien
- Depot(s): Erdberg, Ottakring

History
- Opened: 6 April 1991; 35 years ago
- Last extension: 2003

Technical
- Line length: 13.4 km (8.3 mi)
- Track gauge: 1,435 mm (4 ft 8 1/2 in) standard gauge
- Electrification: 750 V DC third rail

Line U3 is a line on the Vienna U-Bahn metro system. Opened in 1991, it currently has 21 stations and a total length of 13.4 km (8.3 mi), from Ottakring to Simmering, making it the shortest line on the network. It is connected to U1 at Stephansplatz, U2 at Volkstheater, U4 at Landstraße and U6 at Westbahnhof.

It is also currently the only Vienna U-Bahn Line not to be connected with the Badner Bahn.

== Stations ==
Line U3 currently serves the following stations:

- Ottakring (transfer to: - P+R park & ride facility)
- Kendlerstraße
- Hütteldorfer Straße
- Johnstraße
- Schweglerstraße
- Westbahnhof (transfer to:)
- Zieglergasse
- Neubaugasse
- Volkstheater (transfer to:)
- Herrengasse
- Stephansplatz (transfer to:)
- Stubentor
- Landstraße (transfer to:)
- Rochusgasse
- Kardinal-Nagl-Platz
- Schlachthausgasse
- Erdberg ( P+R park & ride facility)
- Gasometer
- Zippererstraße
- Enkplatz
- Simmering (transfer to:)
