= Heiligenstadt station (Vienna U-Bahn) =

Vienna U-Bahn station

Heiligenstadt
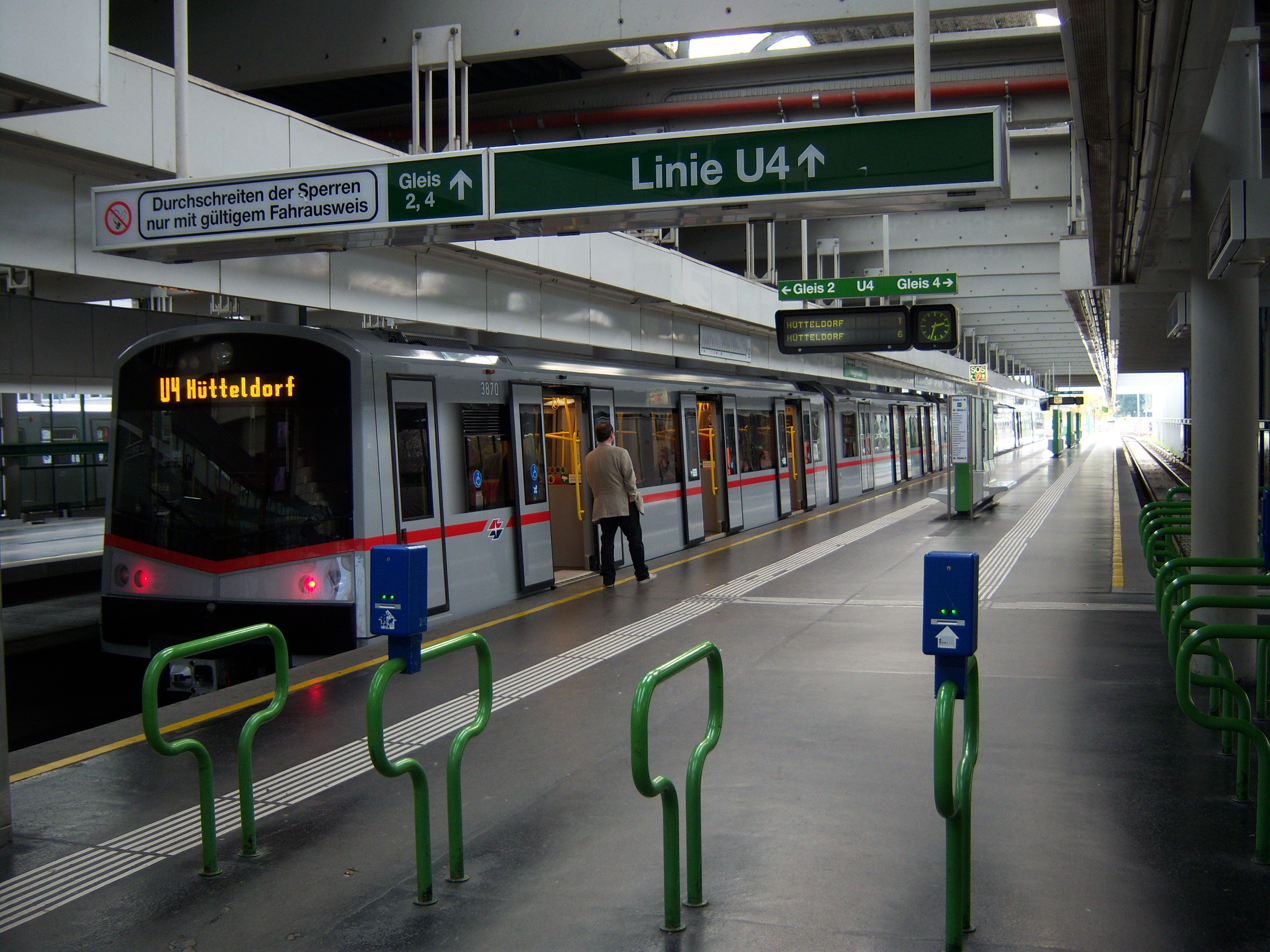

General information
- Location: Döbling, Vienna; Austria
- Coordinates: 48.2485°N 16.3658°E
- System: Vienna U-Bahn rapid transit station
- Owner: Wiener Linien
- Operator: Wiener Linien
- Platforms: 2 (1 island platform, 1 bay platform)
- Tracks: 4
- Connections: ÖBB:,, Regionalbahn, REX; Wiener Linien Bus: 5B, 10A, 11A, 38A, 39A

Construction
- Accessible: Yes

Other information
- Status: Operating
- Fare zone: 100 (Core Zone)

History
- Opened: 8 May 1976
- Electrified: 750 V DC Third rail

Services
Preceding station	Wiener Linien	Following station
Spittelau toward Hütteldorf	U4	Terminus
Location

Heiligenstadt is a station on U4 of the Vienna U-Bahn (an urban rapid-transit system). Beside the U-Bahn station is the Wien Heiligenstadt railway station, which is served by Vienna S-Bahn lines S40 and S45.

Both stations are located in the Döbling District. The U-Bahn station opened in 1976.
