= Ottakring station =

Vienna U-Bahn station

Ottakring
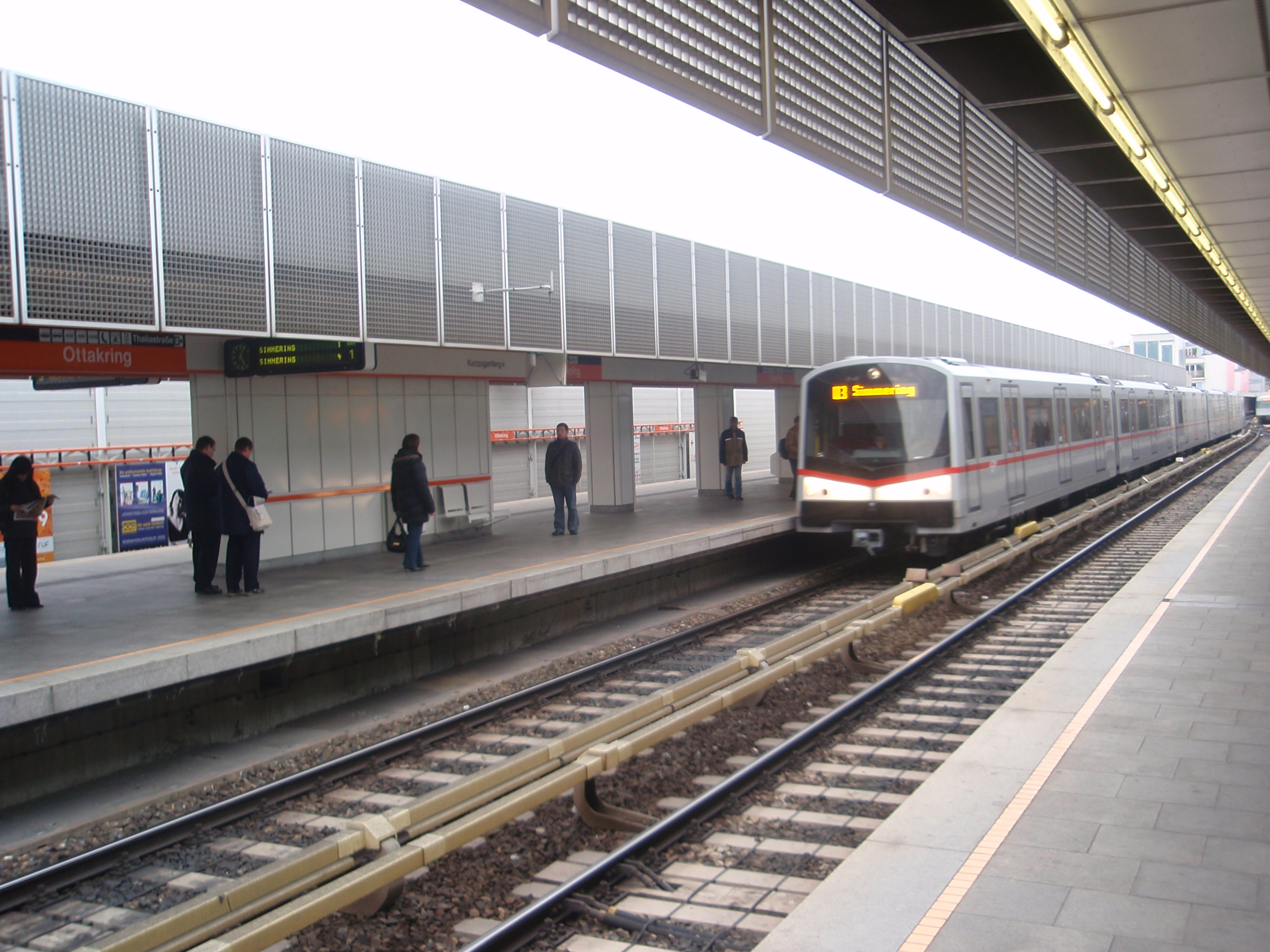

General information
- Location: Ottakring, Vienna; Austria
- Coordinates: 48.2113°N 16.3114°E
- Lines: (Interchange); P+R

History
- Opened: 1998

Services
Preceding station	Wiener Linien	Following station
Terminus	U3	Kendlerstraße toward Simmering
Location

Ottakring is a station on U3 of the Vienna U-Bahn. Beside the U-Bahn station is the Wien Ottakring railway station, which is served by line S45 of the Vienna S-Bahn.

Both stations are located in the Ottakring District. The U-Bahn station opened in 1998.
