= Simmering station =

Vienna U-Bahn station

Simmering
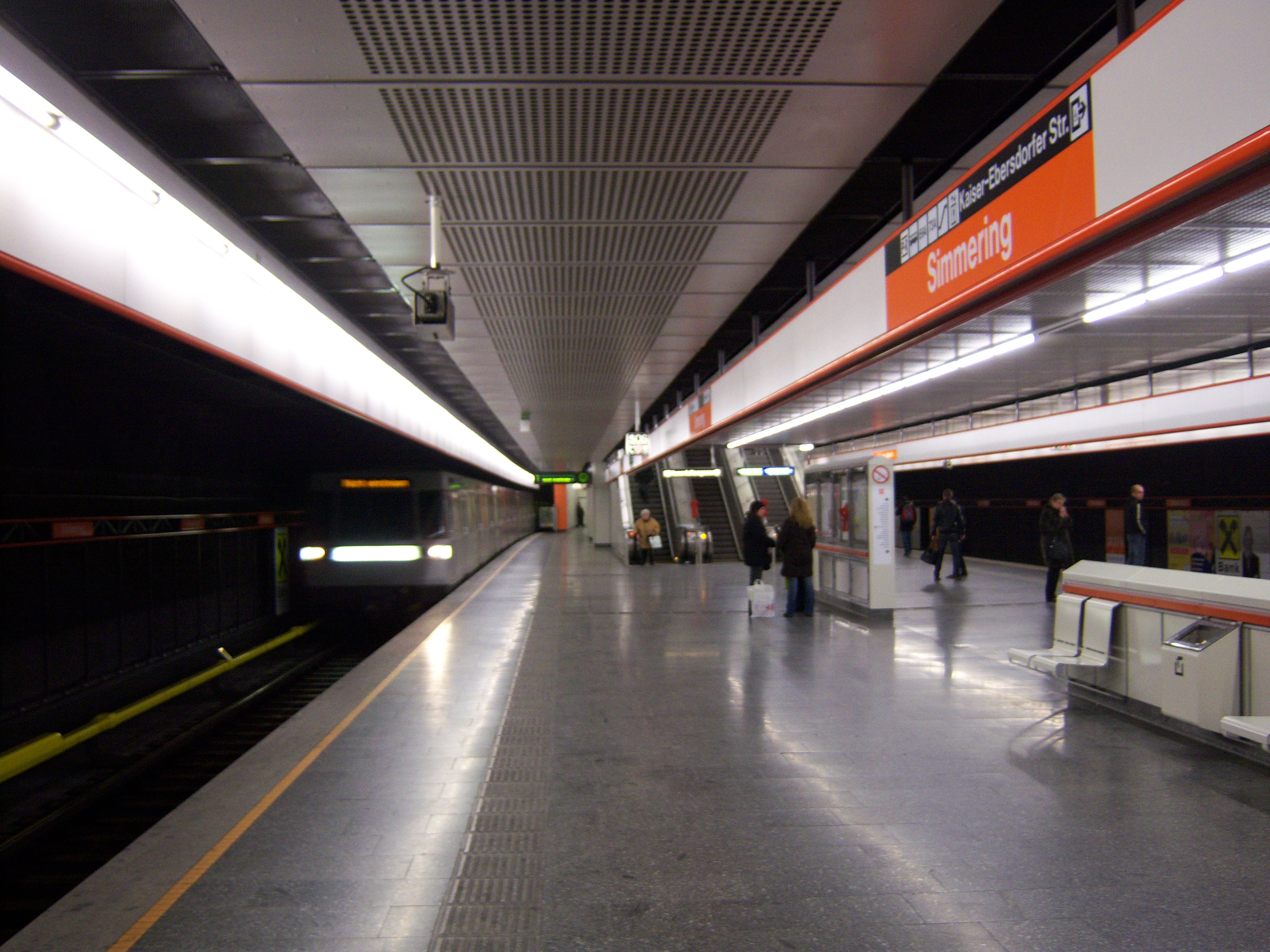

General information
- Location: Simmering, Vienna; Austria
- Coordinates: 48.1705°N 16.4202°E
- Lines: (Interchange)

History
- Opened: 2000

Services
Preceding station	Wiener Linien	Following station
Enkplatz toward Ottakring	U3	Terminus
Location

Simmering is a station on U3 of the Vienna U-Bahn. Above the U-Bahn station is the Wien Simmering railway station, which is served by international and regional trains, and also by line S80 of the Vienna S-Bahn.

Both stations are located in the Simmering District. The U-Bahn station opened in 2000.
