= Wiener Linien =

Operator for the transport system in Vienna

Coordinates: 48°11′23″N 16°24′52″E

Vienna Transit GmbH & Co KG

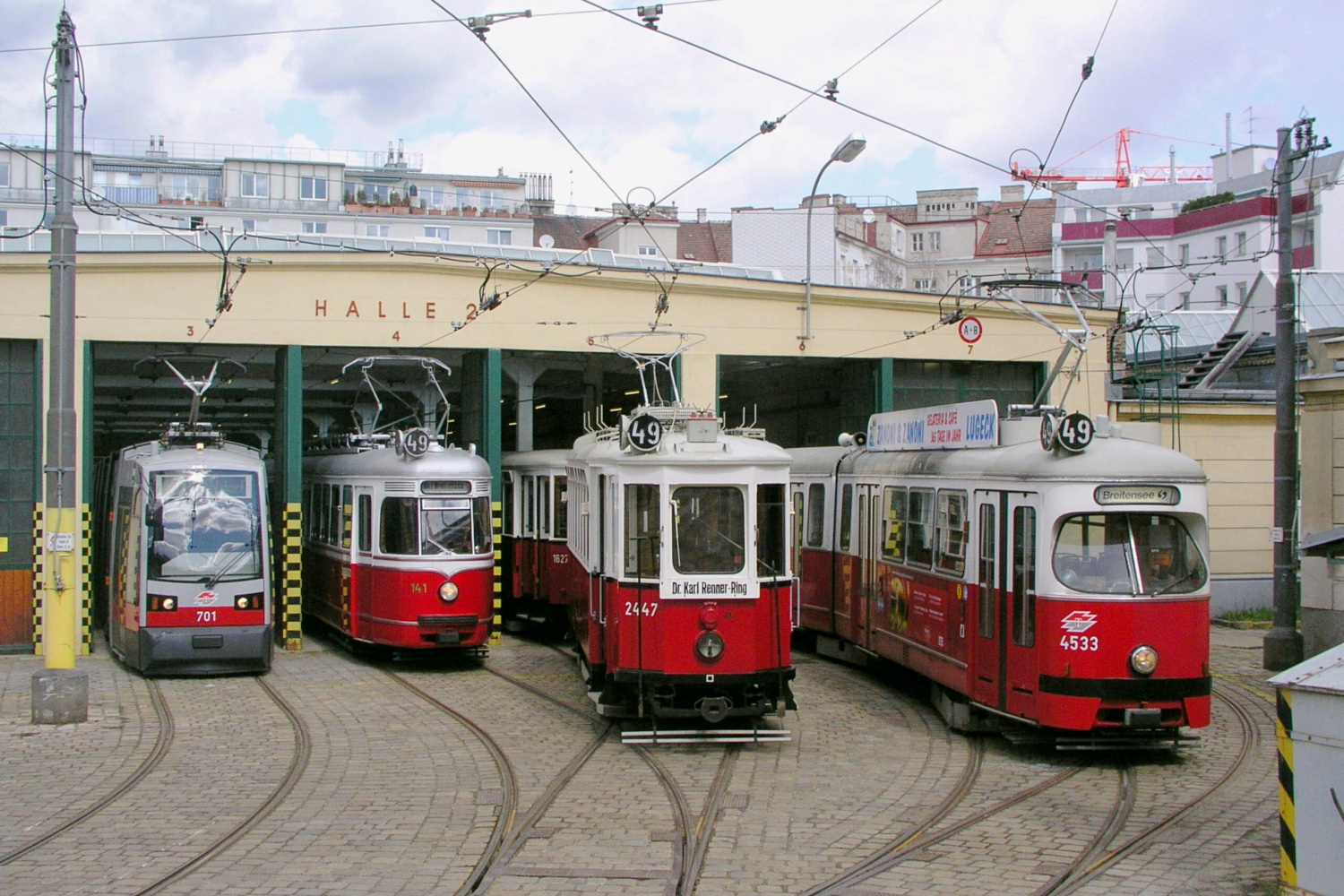
- Four generations of Wiener Linien trams at Breitensee Depot

Overview
- Locale: Vienna, Austria
- Transit type: Bus, tram, and subway
- Number of lines: 167 lines (134 bus, 28 tram, 5 subway)
- Number of stations: 5711 stations (4441 bus, 1161 tram,109 subway)
- Annual ridership: 792.0 million (2023); 960.7 million (2019); 252.4 million subway (2023); 273.4 million tram (2023); 166.2 million bus (2023)
- Chief executive: Alexandra Reinagl (CEO)
- Headquarters: Erdbergstraße 202, 1030 Wien
- Website: www.wienerlinien.at

Operation
- Began operation: 1999, previously Wiener Stadtwerke – Verkehrsbetriebe
- Operator: Wiener Stadtwerke Holding AG
- Number of vehicles: 453 buses, 488 trams, 774 subway

Technical
- System length: 885.8 km (550.4 mi) bus 229.8 km (142.8 mi) tram 83.0 km (51.6 mi) subway

Wiener Linien (Viennese Lines) is the company running most of the public transit network in the city of Vienna, Austria. It is part of the city corporation Wiener Stadtwerke.

== Governing structure and statistics ==
Until decentralisation on 11 June 1999, Wiener Linien was Wiener Stadtwerke – Verkehrsbetriebe, a directly administered subsidiary of the Vienna city government as they had been for over a hundred years. They are still under city control as part of the responsibilities of the City Administrator for Finance, Economics, Work, International affairs and Wiener Stadtwerke, currently Peter Hanke.

As of 2009, Wiener Linien employ approximately 8,000 people and serve approximately 812 million passengers. Ridership numbers have climbed since the 1970s and now exceeds those of 2005 by approximately 60 million. The number of annual season ticket holders has risen to a new record of 334,577, of whom approximately one third are seniors. 24% of all passengers are schoolchildren. Sales rose slightly in 2004 to €345.2. According to surveys, 36% of all journeys in Vienna are completed using public transport, which puts the city in first place in Europe. Since 2012, Wiener Linien has also pioneered the concept of the 365-Euro-Ticket, in this case valid within the Kernzone Wien des Verkehrsverbund Ost-Region (Vienna Core Zone of the Eastern Region Transport Association) for the general public.

Passengers are represented by a Passenger Advisory Council and can make suggestions for improvements. Council members serve four-year terms.

== Transit network ==
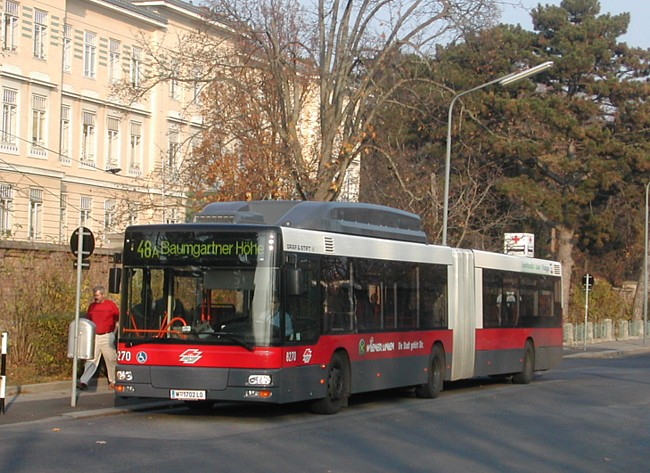
MAN NG 273 LPG class # 8270 bus at Baumgartner Höhe terminus of route 48A

Wiener Linien operates both bus and tram (Straßenbahn) surface routes, as well as partly or entirely underground metro lines (Vienna U-Bahn).

The U-Bahn network is being steadily expanded, and to a lesser extent the bus routes, especially in outlying areas of the city. U-Bahn ridership is likewise growing strongly, but in contrast tram ridership is slightly lower and there has been a reduction in tram mileage in recent years (from 231.4 km (143.8 mi) in 2004 to 227.3 km (141.2 mi) in 2007).

As of 2023 Wiener Linien operated:

- 5 U-Bahn lines with a 83.0 km (51.6 mi) line length (83.9 km (52.1 mi) operational length, 253.1 km (157.3 mi) total track length) and 352.4 million passengers
- 28 tram lines with a 222.7 km (138.4 mi) line length (229.8 km (142.8 mi) operational length, 419.0 km (260.4 mi) total track length) and 273.4 million passengers
- 134 bus lines (incl. night and on-demand lines) with a line length of 885.8 km (550.4 mi) and 166.2 million passengers

The system is supplemented by 26 bus routes operated by subcontractors who also operate their own routes in and around Vienna. In addition there are 7 routes of Demand responsive transport. Wiener Linien services also connect to mainline ÖBB trains and the Vienna S-Bahn.

Most daytime services run between 5:00 am and 0:30 am. During rush hours, many routes run at intervals of two to five minutes; during evening hours, the U-Bahn runs at 7 and a half minute intervals while trams and buses run every ten to 15 minutes. Between 0:30 and 5:00 am night buses substitute daytime services, running at intervals of 30 minutes (excluding the lines N8, N25, N60 and N66 which run every 15 minutes since July 2020). Following a February 2010 plebiscite, nighttime U-Bahn service has been installed on weekends in 15-minute-intervals.

Wiener Linien fares are integrated into the VOR (Verkehrsverbund Ost-Region, East Region Transportation Association); their routes all lie within its core zone (Zone 100). Schoolchildren, students, the unemployed, and pensioners are served at significantly reduced prices.

=== U-Bahn ===
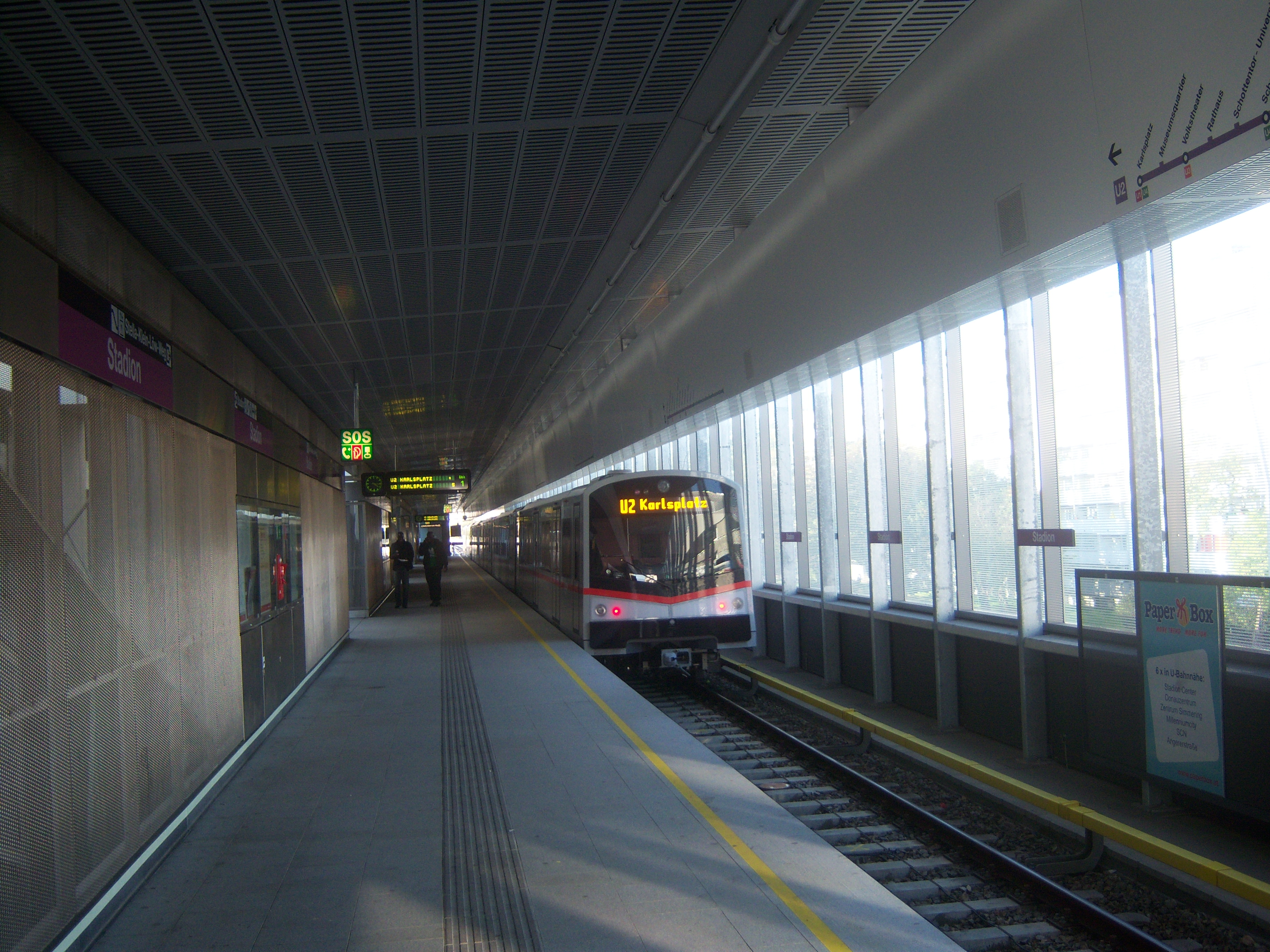
Type V U2 train at Stadion station

The Vienna U-Bahn has existed under this name since 1976, when the stretch of the 1898–1901 Vienna Stadtbahn (Vienna Metropolitan Railway) between Heiligenstadt and Friedensbrücke stations was experimentally adapted and placed in operation as Line U4. The construction of a metro in Vienna had been preceded by decades of political debate, since the Social Democratic majority in Vienna had initially preferred other modes of transit. The first stretch of newly constructed U-Bahn rail was placed in operation in 1978 (U1 from Reumannplatz to Karlsplatz). The Vienna U-Bahn system currently consists of five lines, is 83.3 km (51.8 mi) long and has 109 stations:

- Oberlaa–Leopoldau (extension southwards from Reumannplatz to Oberlaa opened in September 2017)
- Seestadt–Karlsplatz (expansion eastwards from Stadion to Aspernstraße opened in October 2010; further extension from Aspernstraße to Seestadt opened in October 2013)
- Ottakring–Simmering
- Hütteldorf–Heiligenstadt (expansion from Hütteldorf westwards under discussion)
- Siebenhirten-Floridsdorf (expansion from Floridsdorf northwards under discussion)

As of 2024 a sixth subway line is under construction replacing the current line from Karlsplatz to Rathaus, then continuing to a new station "Frankhplatz". The new line is scheduled to open in 2026. From 2026 until 2030 both lines and will serve the route between Rathaus and Karlsplatz. An expansion of line to Matzleinsdofer Platz via Neubaugasse, Pilgramgasse, and Reinprechtsdorfer Straße, branching off from the current route at Rathaus is currently under construction and scheduled to open in 2030. After this extension is built, line will be replaced by line between Rathaus and Karlsplatz. In the second construction stage will be further expanded to Wienerberg and will be expanded to Hernals via Michelbeuern-AKH.

=== Trams ===
The Wiener Straßenbahn (Vienna tramway) has existed since 1865, when the first horsedrawn tram went into service; the first line was electrified in 1897. Originally operated by private transport firms, the tramway was purchased by the city government around 1900 and in the years that followed massively expanded under the name Gemeinde Wien - Städtische Straßenbahnen (Municipality of Vienna - City Tramways). Electrified at the city's expense, the trams were integrated into the transport network in 1925. Until construction of the U-Bahn, the trams were the primary mode of public transport in Vienna.

After 1945, numerous tram lines were abandoned because of increasing use of private cars or converted to bus routes because of economic unviability. Beginning in 1978, in the course of construction of the U-Bahn, tram routes parallelling U-Bahn routes were discontinued. Nonetheless, the tram system in Vienna remains one of the most extensive in the world. Currently, 28 regular lines operate, with a total length of 229.8 km (142.8 mi). Further cutbacks are expected in the next few years as the U-Bahn continues to expand; however, extensions and new lines are also planned, above all in the 21st and 22nd districts.

=== Buses ===
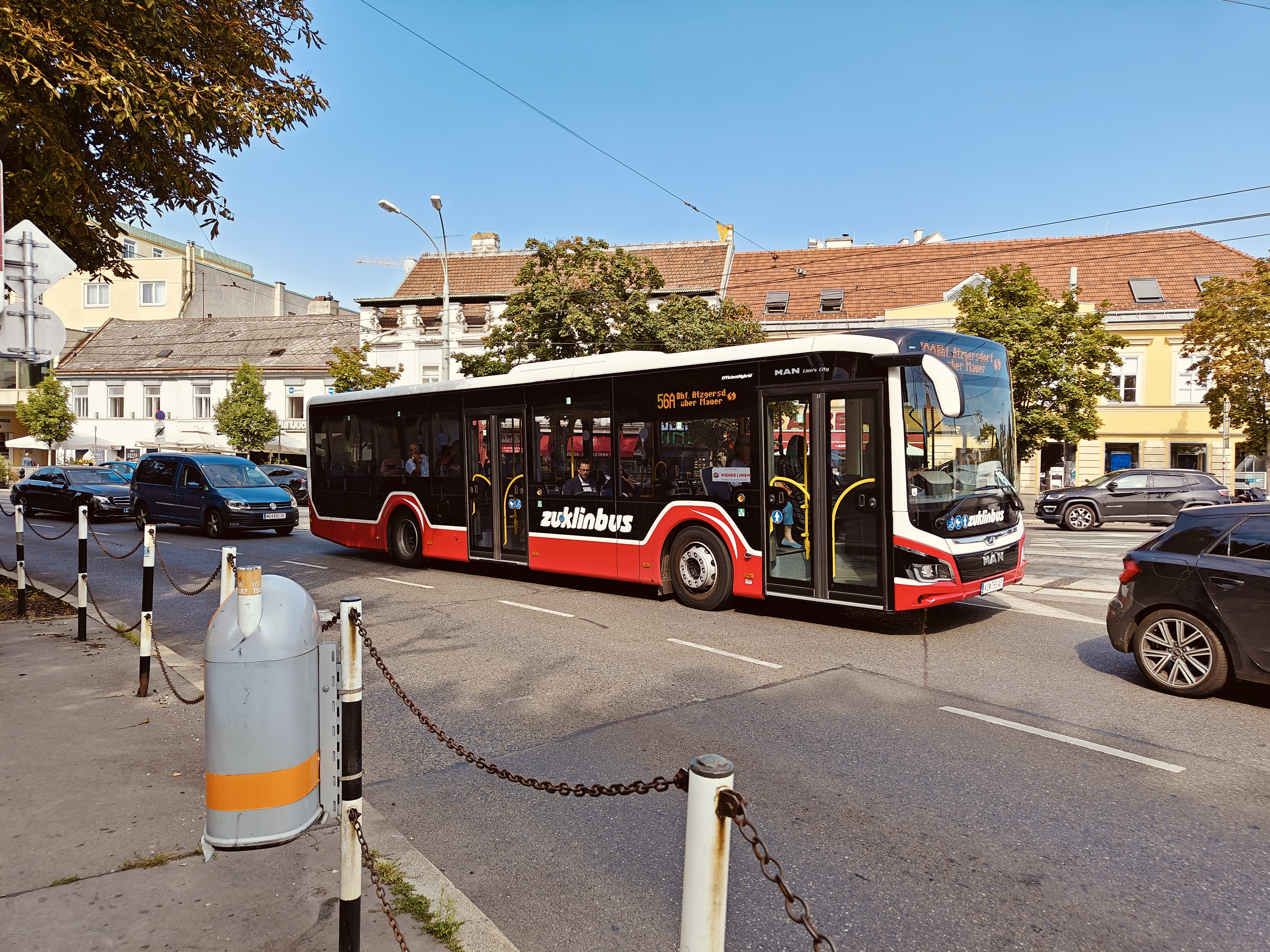
Wienerlinien bus line 56A Vienna between Hietzing and Bahnhof Atzgersdorf

The Municipality of Vienna has operated bus lines since the 1920s; they increased in importance after suburban development increased demand for transport connections and after many tram lines in densely built-up areas were replaced by bus service.

Currently approximately 700 buses are in operation on 134 routes along (including night time routes) with a total length of approximately 885.5 km (550.2 mi), carrying approximately 166 million passengers a year. Vienna Linien bus routes are designated with A (for Autobus) or B (for Bus) to distinguish them at a glance from tram routes. About 55% of daytime bus routes are operated by sub-contractors on behalf of the Wiener Linien.

== Criticism ==
In 2005, Wiener Linien received the negative Big Brother Award in the People's Choice category because of camera surveillance.
