= Städtische Straßenbahn =

Städtische Straßenbahn may refer to

- The Städtische Straßenbahnen, a former operator of the Munich tramway in Munich, Germany
- The Städtische Straßenbahnen, a former operator of trams in Vienna, Austria
- The Städtische Straßenbahnen Berlin, a former operator of the Berlin tramway in Berlin, Germany
- The Städtische Strassenbahn Zürich, a public transport operator in Zurich, Switzerland
