= Trams in Vienna =

Overview of the tram system of Vienna, Austria

Coordinates: 48°12′29.40″N 16°22′21.13″E

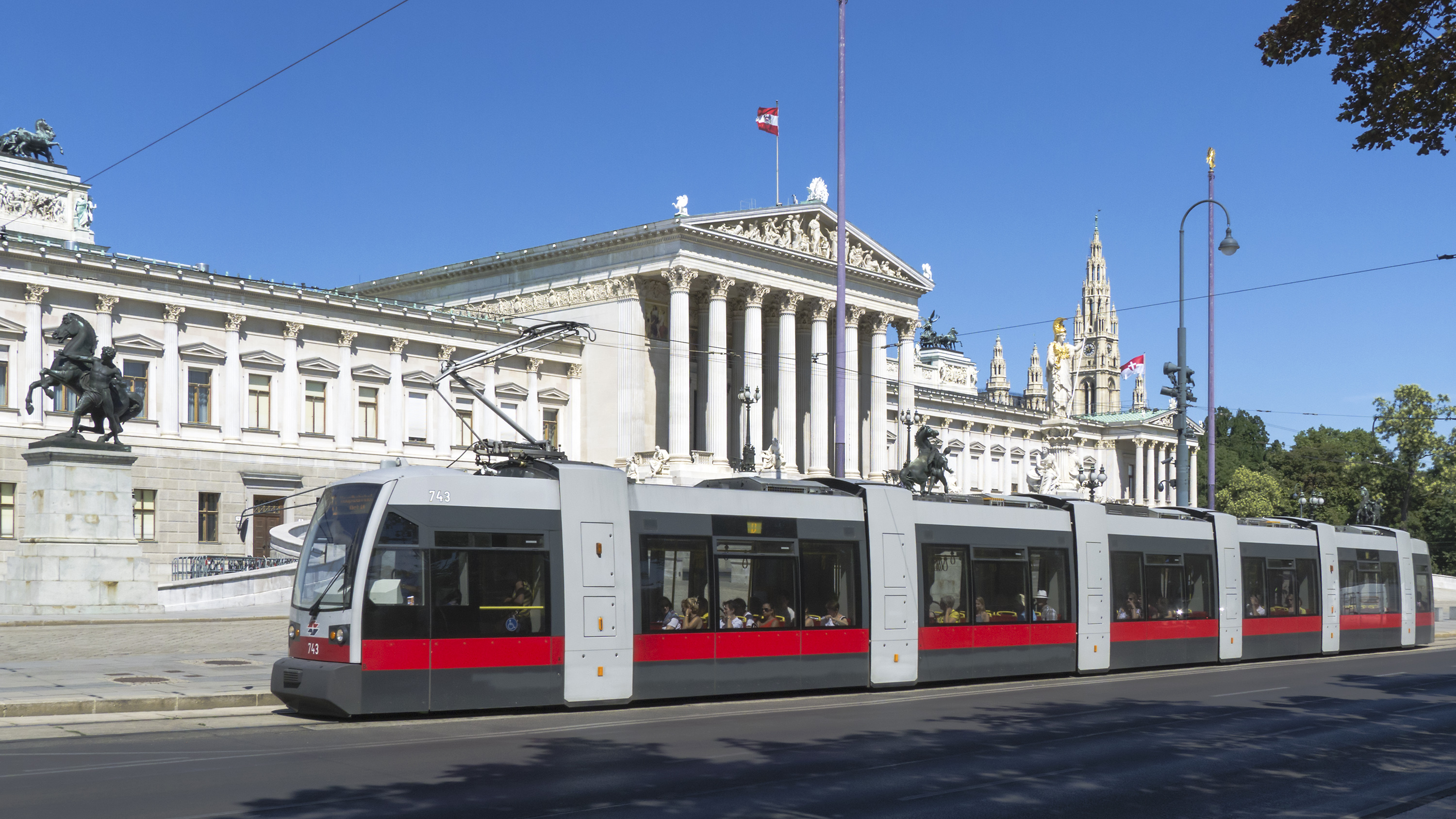

Operation
- Locale: Vienna, Austria

Statistics
Horsecar era: 1865–1903
- Operators: Schaeck-Jaquet & Comp. Wiener Tramwaygesellschaft; Neue Wiener Tramwaygesellschaft
- Track gauge: 1,435 mm (4 ft 8 1/2 in) standard gauge
- Propulsion system: Horses
Steam tram era: 1883–1922
- Operators: Dampftramway Krauss & Comp. Neue Wiener Tramwaygesellschaft
- Track gauge: 1,435 mm (4 ft 8 1/2 in) standard gauge
- Propulsion system: Steam
Electric tram era: since 1897
- Status: Open
- Routes: 28
- Operator: Wiener Linien
- Track gauge: 1,435 mm (4 ft 8 1/2 in) standard gauge
- Propulsion system: Electricity
- Electrification: 600 V DC overhead line
- Stock: 525
- Track length (total): 418.5 km (260.0 mi) (2024)
- Route length: 227.4 km (141.3 mi) (2024)
- Stops: 1,146
- 2024: 291.8 million
- Website: Wiener Linien

Trams in Vienna (German: Wiener Straßenbahn, in everyday speech also Bim or Tramway) are a vital part of the public transport system in Vienna, capital city of Austria. In operation since 1865, with the completion of a 2 km (1.2 mi) route to industrial estates near Simmering, it reached its maximum extent of 292 km (181.4 mi) in 1942. In February 2026, it was the third largest tram network in the world, at about 227.4 kilometres (141.3 mi) in total length and 1,146 stations.

The trams on the network run on standard gauge track. Since 1897, they have been powered by electricity, at 600 V DC. The current operator of the network is Wiener Linien. In 2024, a total of 291.8 million passengers travelled on the network's trams. As of 2013, there were 525 tramcars in Vienna's tram fleet, including 404 trams or tramsets scheduled for service during peak periods, comprising 215 single cars and 189 motor and trailer sets.

== History ==
=== Horsecar tramways ===
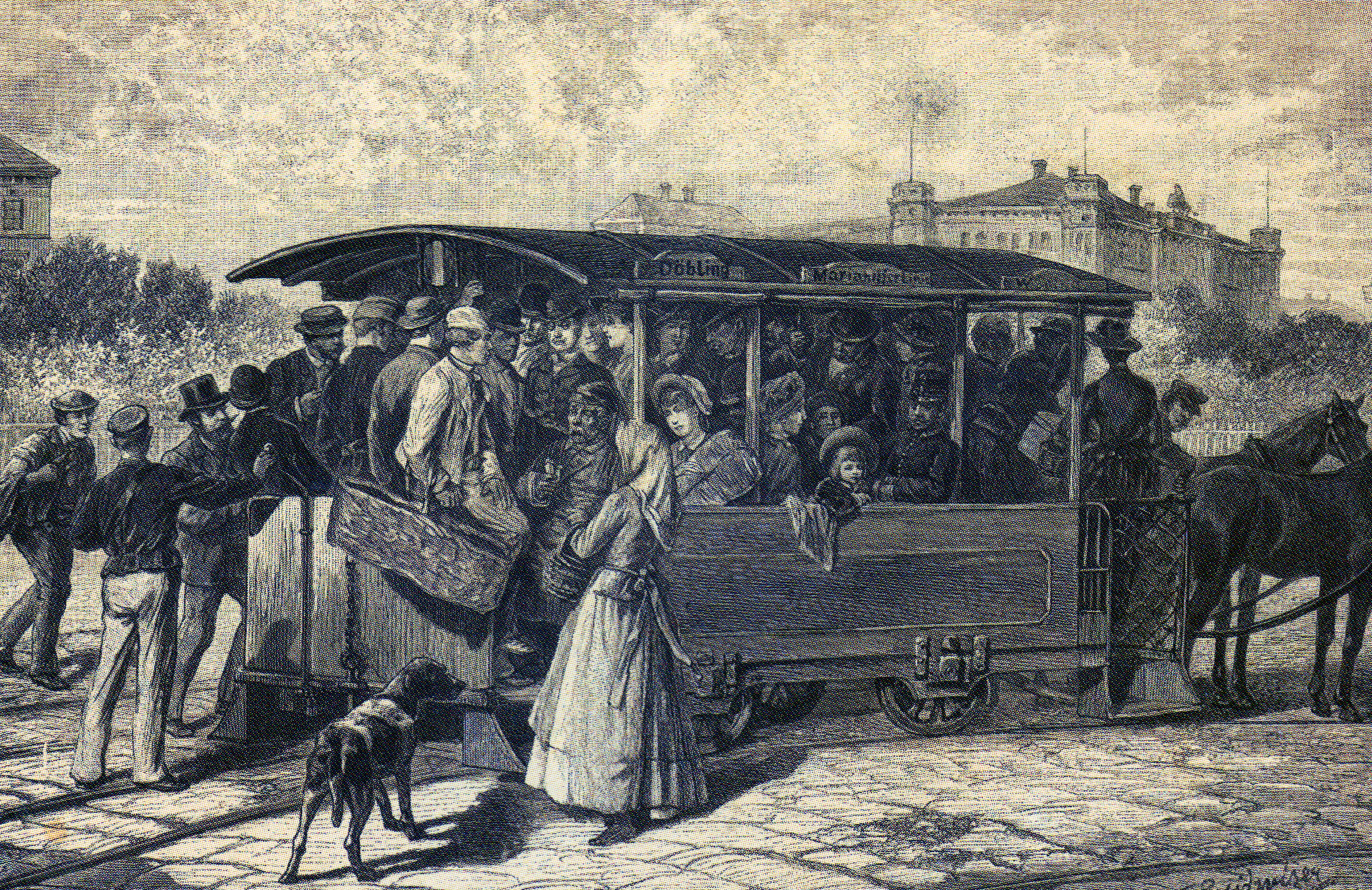
Suburban horsecar tram at Wien Westbahnhof, 1885.

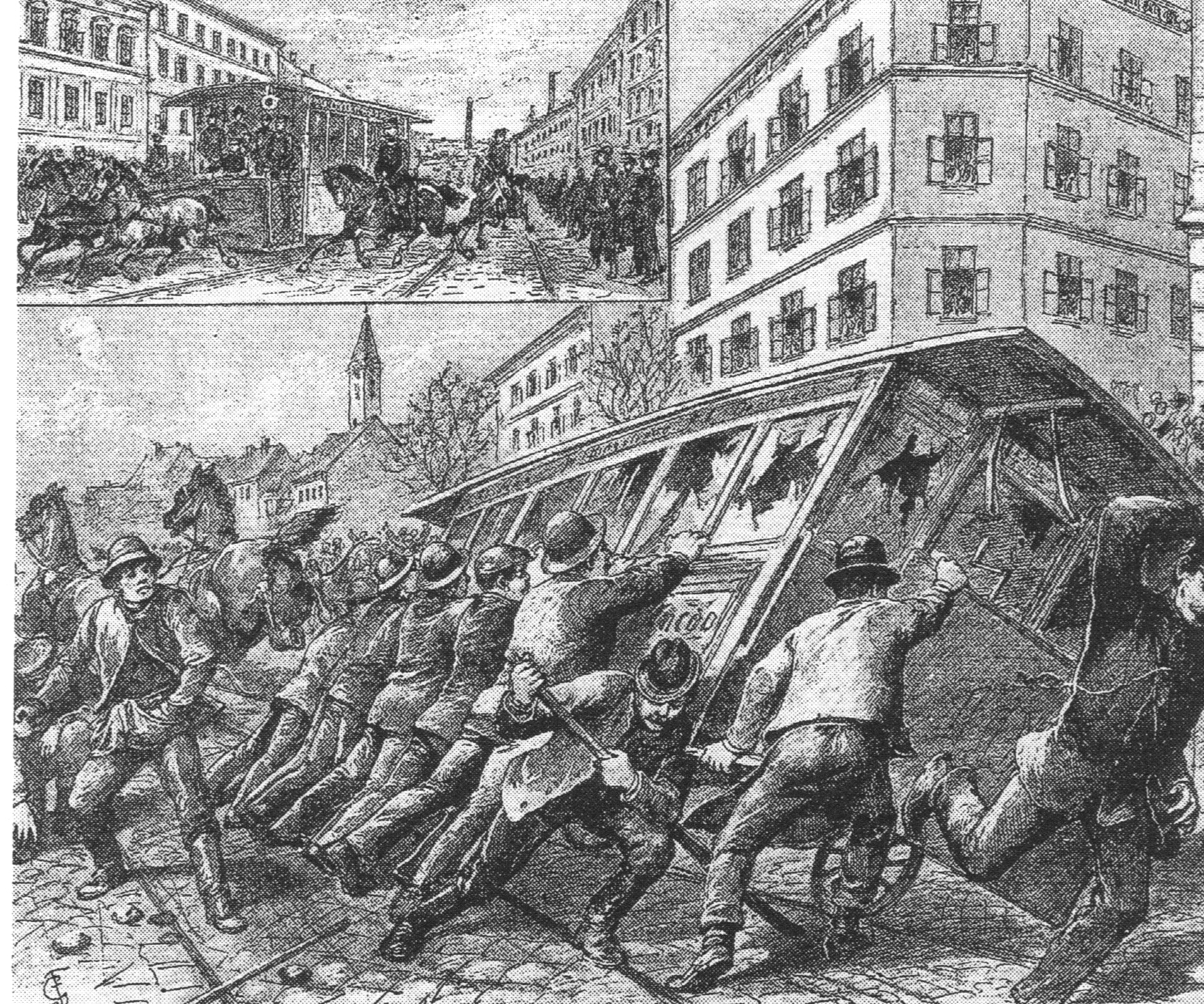
Tramway strike in Wien-Hernals, 21–22 April 1889.

The earliest precursor of the Vienna tramway network was the Brigittenauer Eisenbahn, a horsecar tramway. From 1840 to 1842, it led from the Donaukanal to the recreational establishment known as the Kolosseum, at the end of the Jägerstraße.

Some two decades later, several firms competed for a concession to construct an urban "horse-tramway" in Vienna. Schaeck-Jaquet & Comp prevailed. By October 1865, trams could be recorded as operating between Schottentor and Hernals, and on 24 April 1866, the route was extended to Dornbach.

Subsequently, the municipality of Vienna tried to persuade other firms to construct tramway lines. However, due to the difficult conditions, all of the competing firms (including Schaeck-Jaquet & Comp) arranged a merger, leaving the newly formed Wiener Tramwaygesellschaft as the only remaining firm. In later years, that firm built the majority of the Vienna tramway network. The social conditions were nevertheless such that labour disputes arose. In 1872, the Neue Wiener Tramwaygesellschaft was formed as a competitor, but was able to build only a network in the suburbs.

=== The steam tramways ===
In 1883, the Dampftramway Krauss & Comp. opened Vienna's first steam tramway line, between Hietzing and Perchtoldsdorf. In 1887, the line was extended further south to Mödling, and towards the city centre to Gaudenzdorf, and a new branch line led to Ober St. Veit. A further line, of national significance, was opened in 1886 from Donaukanal to Stammersdorf, where the trams connected with trains on the Stammersdorfer Lokalbahn to Auersthal. From Floridsdorf a branch line led to Groß Enzersdorf.

Alongside the Dampftramway Krauss & Comp., the Neue Wiener Tramwaygesellschaft also operated a few lines with steam locomotives.

=== Early electric tramways ===
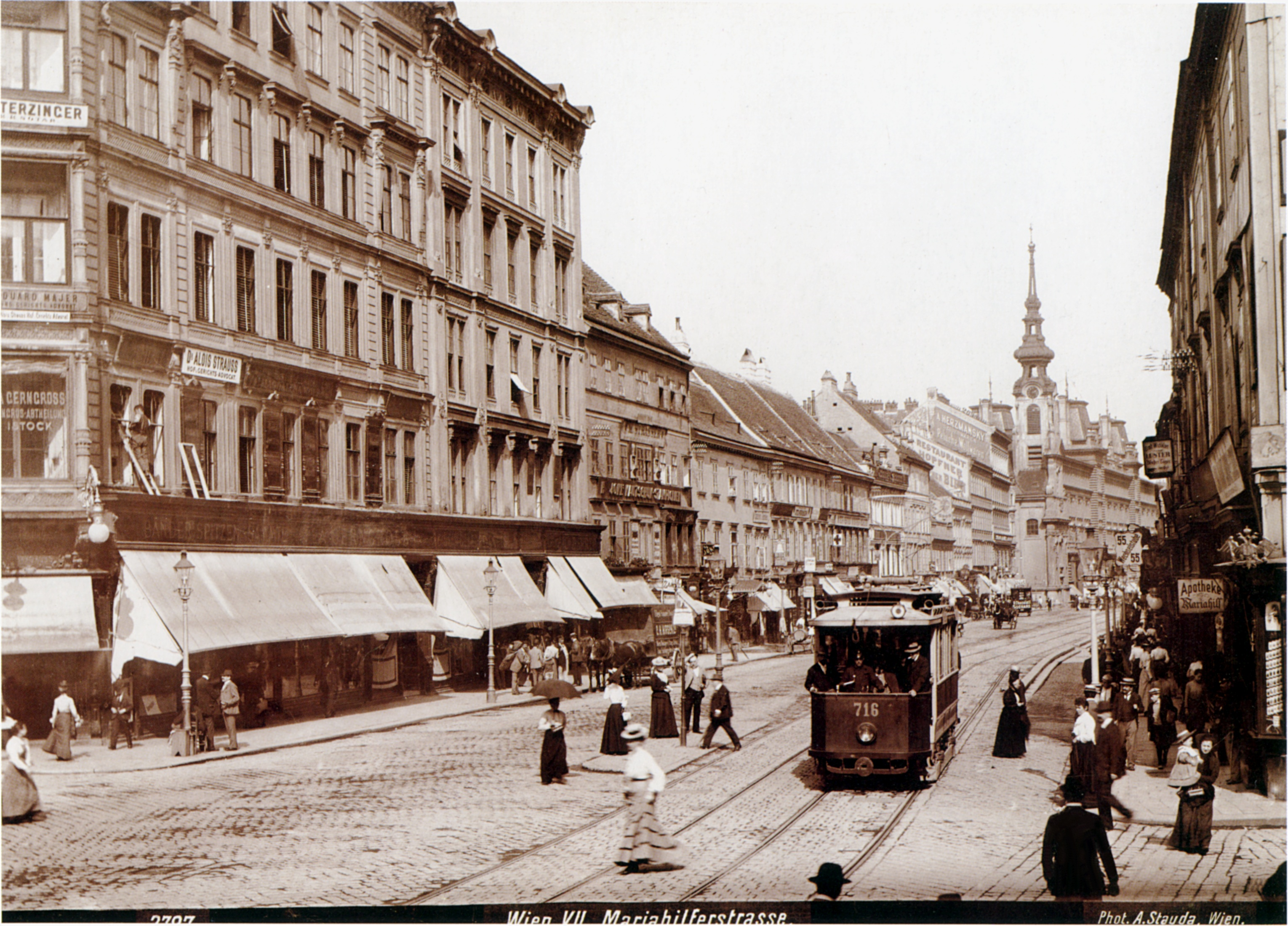
Innere Mariahilfer Straße, view towards the city centre, with tram, 1908.

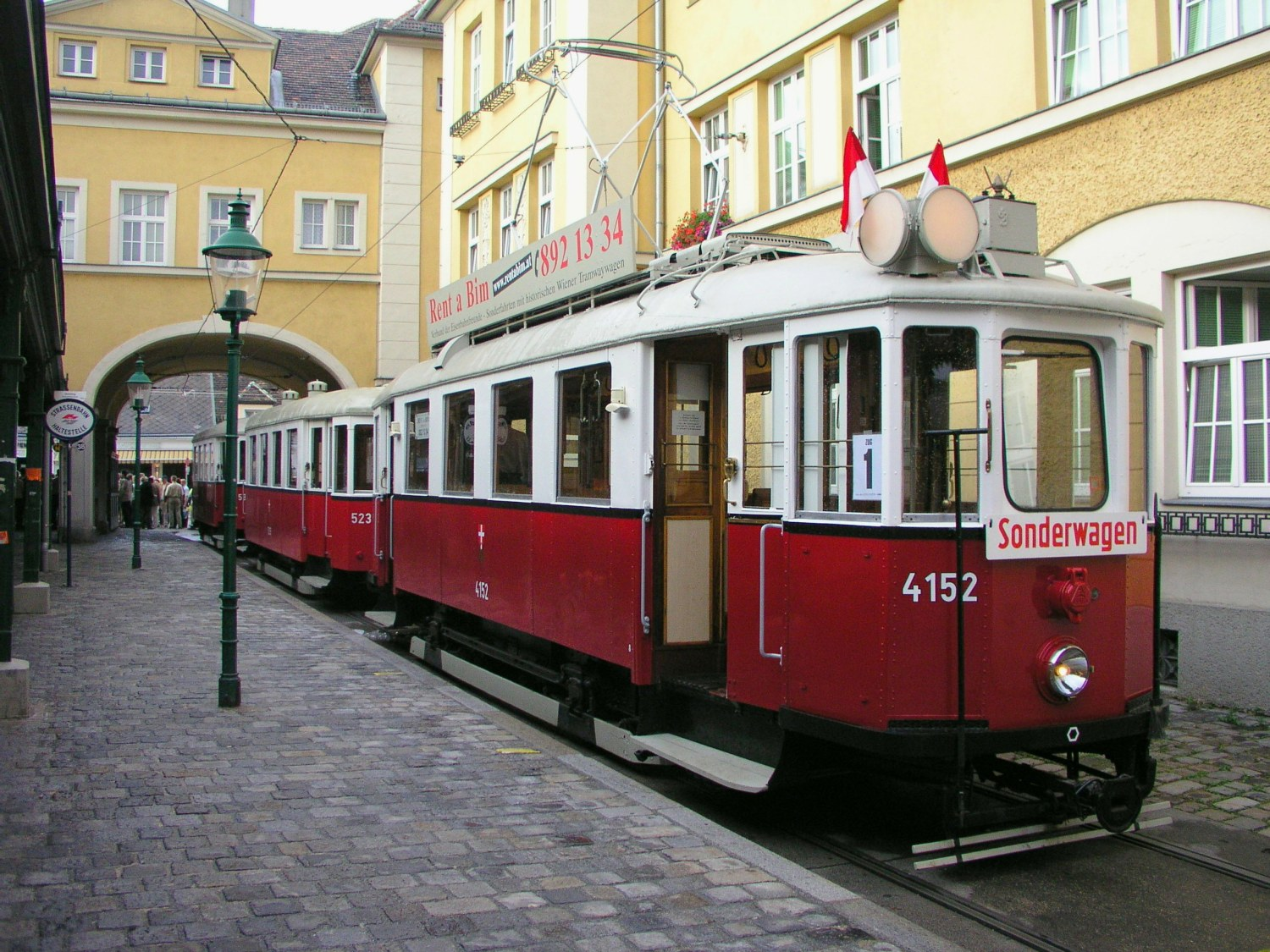
M-tramcar with m-trailer car (special train) at the line 38 terminus in Grinzing.

At the turn of the twentieth century, Vienna's Bürgermeister Karl Lueger began the municipalization of urban services, which, until then, had been supplied by private enterprises. In 1899, by a proclamation issued by Minister Heinrich von Wittek, the municipality received a 90-year concession from the Imperial Railway Ministry for "a network of standard gauge light railway lines in Vienna to be operated by electric power". The 99 lines (or sections) explicitly identified in the proclamation included new lines, and the purchase of the network of the Wiener Tramwaygesellschaft, the employees of which were to be taken on as far as possible by the city. The lines were integrated into the Gemeinde Wien – Städtische Straßenbahnen service, which was entered on 4 April 1902 into the company register. In 1903, the network of the Neue Wiener Tramwaygesellschaft was also purchased.

On 28 January 1897, an electric tram operated for the first time in Vienna: on the tracks of today's line 5. With their lower noise and odour production compared with horse-drawn and steam tramways, the electric trams quickly became favourites. On 26 June 1903, the last horse tramway was ceremoniously farewelled. In 1907, the line designations still valid today, using numbers and letters, were introduced. The steam tramway was able to continue operating its services until 1922 on a few branch lines in the outer suburbs. Well into the second half of the twentieth century, Viennese frequently referred to the electrified tramway as die Elektrische (the electric).

Up until 1910, the only trams delivered to the Vienna tramway network were vehicles with unglazed platforms (or cabs), i.e.: without any windscreens protecting occupants from the cold and wind. This was still in the tradition of the horse cars, on which direct contact of the driver with the harnessed horses was required. (It took until 1930 until the cabs and platforms of all tramcars had protective glass.) In 1911, the first double stops were introduced.

During World War I, tram operations were increasingly difficult to perform. From 1916, women had to take over part of the work of the male tramway staff engaged by the military. Due to the harsh conditions of that time, operations had to be partially closed down. In 1917, a quarter of all stops were abandoned.

On 16 October 1925, the Wiener Stadtbahn, which had been taken over by the municipality of Vienna, was absorbed into the tramway network's tariff system. In 1929, the peak tram fleet was achieved, and in 1930 the network reached its maximum length, 318 km (198 mi). In the interwar period, Vienna had more people than today. In 1910, the city reached 2.1 million; after First World I began, the population decreased significantly, reaching its lowest level at the time of the 1991 census, at about half a million. Between the wars, the tramway was virtually unrivalled as a city transport in Vienna.

After the Anschluss with Germany's Third Reich, the tramway network was changed on 19 September 1938 from left hand traffic to right hand traffic. During World War II, tram operations continued, for as long as Vienna remained spared from fighting. Its peak haulage, on the then still extensive route network, was almost 732 million passengers, in 1943. That year, 18,000 people found work on Vienna's tramways.

In 1944–1945, however, when Vienna was bombed extensively, operations had to be gradually closed down, until the last line, the O-Line, was closed on 7 April 1945.

=== After World War II ===
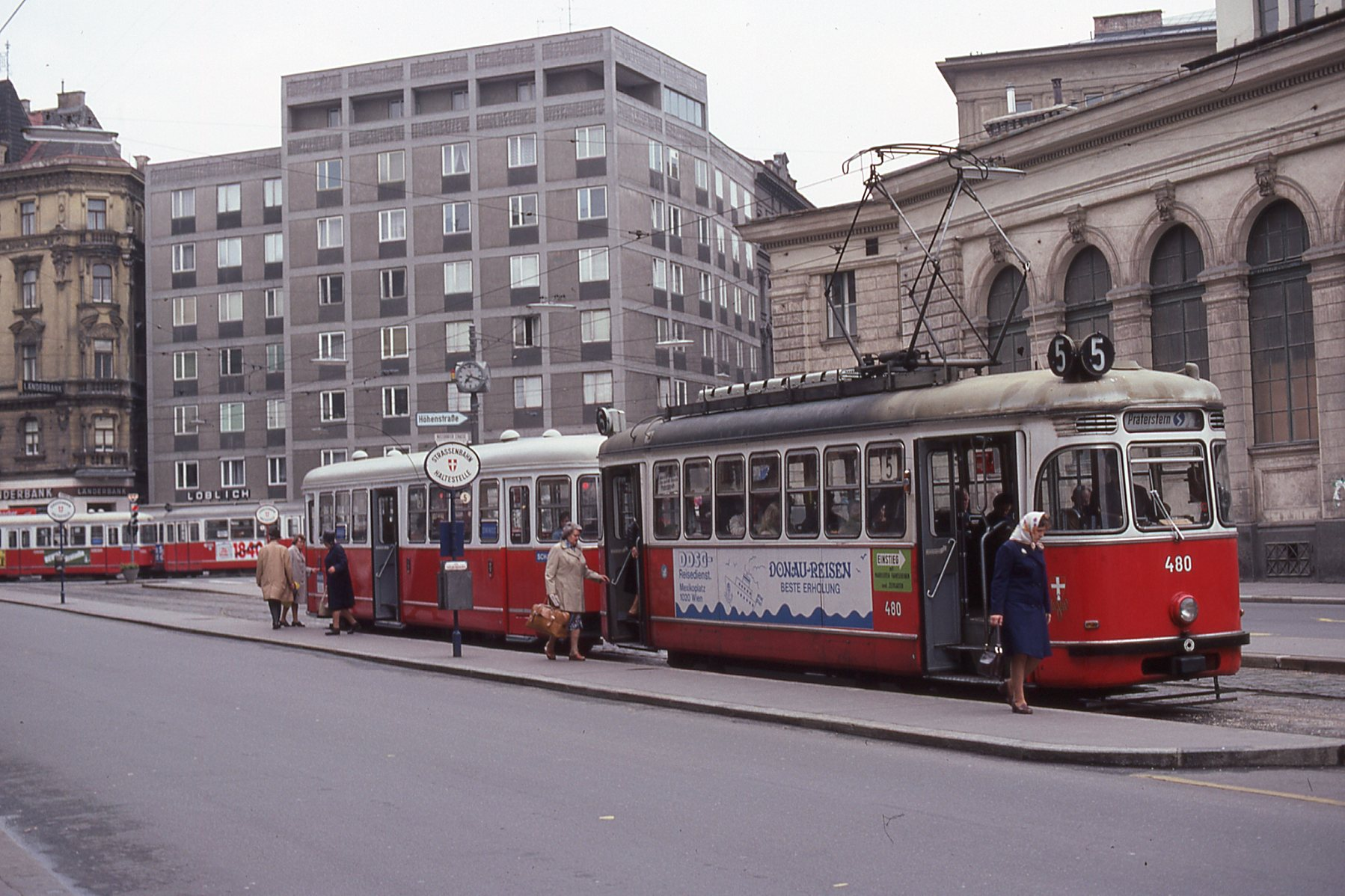
In the 1950s, four wheel trams of Type L were still being built for Vienna. (1976)

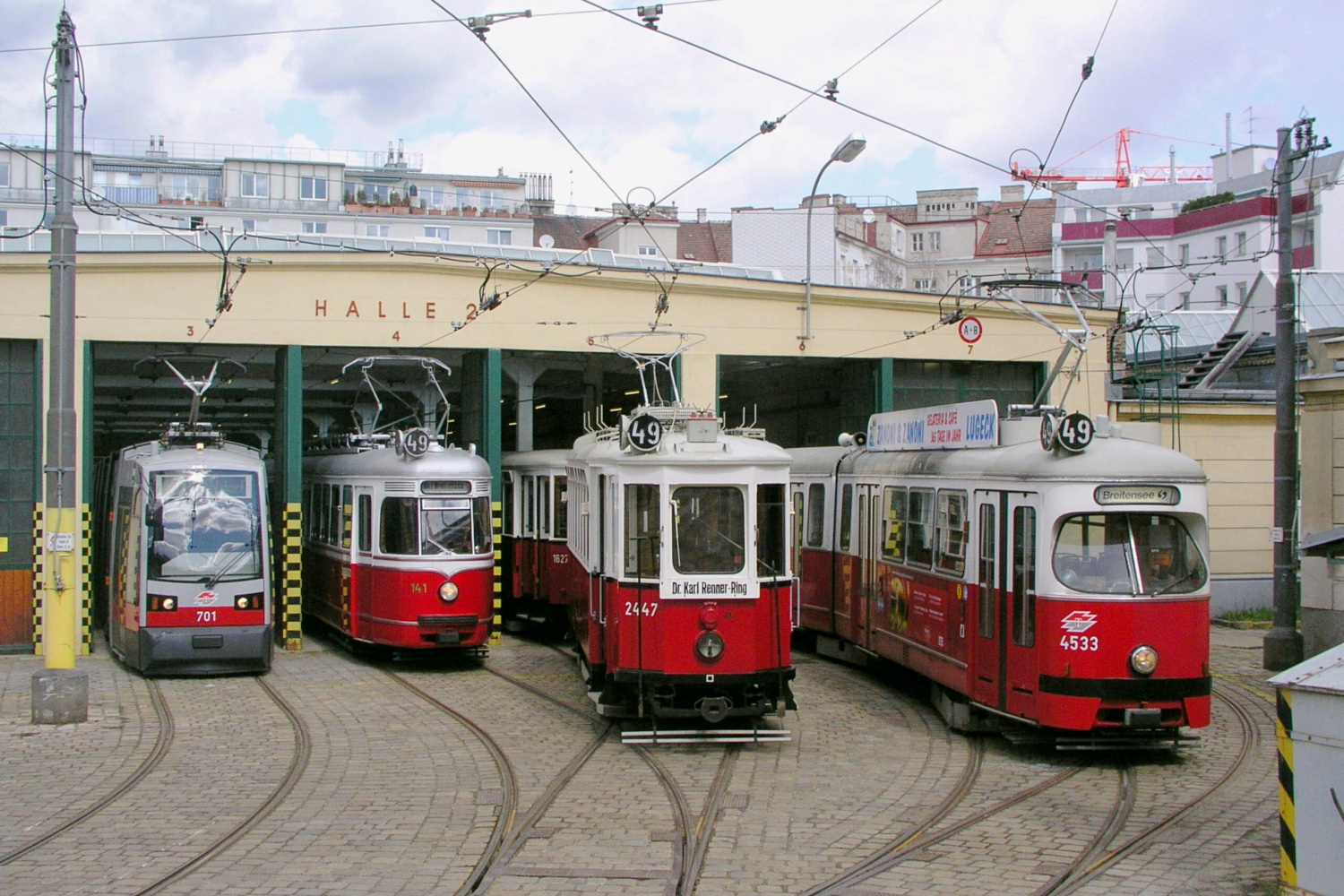
Four tram generations in the Breitensee tram depot (closed in 2006) on Line 49.

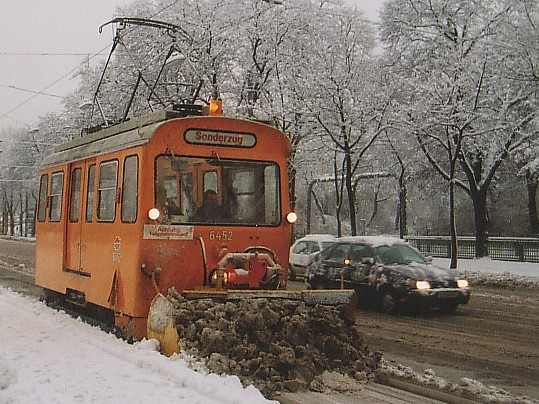
Work tram with snowplow on the Wiener Ringstraße.

Following the Battle of Vienna in early April 1945, the first five lines were able to be returned to service on 28 April. Most of the city's fleet of 4000 trams were badly damaged, 400 of them beyond repair. The task of restoring the network would not be completed until 1950; some short sections of track were never put back into operation.

In 1948, Vienna acquired second hand trams of Type Z (road numbers 4201-4242) under the Marshall Plan from New York. These trams, which became known as Amerikaner (Americans), were a little wider than other trams used in Vienna. They could only be put into operation on tracks that had a wider track spacing, left over from the steam tramways. An example of these more widely spaced tracks was Line 331 to Stammersdorf. The Amerikaner were comparatively modern, because they were equipped with air-operated doors and automatic retractable ramps. Additionally, the seat backs could be adjusted, so that all seated passengers could always face towards the direction of travel. Some of the major modifications required for the Amerikaner to be able to run in Vienna were carried out by Gräf & Stift in Wien-Liesing.

Until the 1950s, the network was still consistently operated with old, repaired and partially rebuilt trams, as new ones could be purchased only from 1951 onwards. Even in the 1950s, new trams were consistently obtained in series of only limited numbers, as from 1955 the abolition of the tramway in Vienna was the contemporary transport planning vision, and investments were made accordingly.

In their early to mid-20th century, private cars had been the exception in European cities, because they had then been too expensive for most of the population. However, with the growth of private transport in the postwar period, the calls for a car-friendly city became louder. Rail traffic on the road was therefore seen as a "transport barrier" (the term "transport" applying only to motor vehicles), and the full relocation of public transport to the U-Bahn and buses was seen as the vision of the future.

In 1956, Vienna's first articulated trams, designated as Type D, were commissioned from Gräf & Stift. Due to the tight financial situation, the new trams were assembled from salvaged parts. The basis of each one was two old Stadtbahn trailer chassis, on which modern car bodies were mounted. The chassis and bodies were then connected, by means of a telescopic joint section, of Italian design. The prototype of the Type D, with road number 4301, was delivered on 3 July 1957. After the testing and commissioning process had been completed, the Type D entered service from 17 February 1958. The inaugural trip operated by these trams was on Line 71.

A total of 16 type D trams were built. They were used until 1976 on Lines 9, 41, 42 and E_{2}. They were cumbersome, due to their high weight (28 t (31 short tons; 28 long tons)), and were also otherwise unconvincing.

=== Changes, new trams, pre-metro and U-Bahn construction ===
In September 2026 line 18 was extended to the Ernst Happel Stadium.

In 1958, at the time of conversion of the short Line 158, the practicality of using buses to replace trams was tested. From 1960, there was ongoing conversion of sections of track running through narrow streets in the densely built up areas within the Gürtel; the best known example is line 13 from Wien Südbahnhof to Alserstrasse. However, individual sections on the periphery of the city, and in surrounding communities beyond the city limits, such as the former steam tramway lines to Mödling and Groß-Enzersdorf, were replaced by bus lines. In the 1960s, a pre-metro system was built to move tramway sections under surface, that - according to the attitudes in those years - obstructed car traffic on the main roads.

The realisation that the contemplated abolition of the tramway would not be a short-term project, mainly because of the rather lengthy construction of the planned U-Bahn network, led to the introduction, from 1959, of the six-axle articulated type E and E_{1} trams, of which a total of 427 were built to 1976. This was a generational change of long-term effect.

The last high-floor articulated trams to enter the fleet were the Type E_{2} vehicles, which were built under licence from Duewag, together with matching type c_{5} trailer cars; they entered service on 28 August 1978 on Line 6, and remain in service today. This type was the first to be fitted with exits featuring retractable steps to improve comfort when entering and alighting. Additionally, the tramcar design was modernized, and the safety features of the technical equipment were considerably improved. A total 98 cars of this type were produced by Simmering-Graz-Pauker, and 24 by Bombardier.

The construction of the Vienna U-Bahn led to further extensive line closures in the tramway network, due to a policy that trams are not to operate in parallel with the U-Bahn, even on short sections. As this policy is still in effect today, further closures of tramway lines can be expected, to coincide with the further expansion of the U-Bahn network. However, the continued existence of the tramway network in Vienna is no longer in question, and there are even some new openings planned.

For reasons of economy, Wiener Linien ceased to roster conductors in trailer cars from 1964, and in powered cars from 1972. Industrial relations factors delayed the final departure of conductors until 1996, when the last conductor ended his service (on Line 46).

On 2 September 2017 the U1 extension to Oberlaa (former tram 67) opened with great fanfare and the section of tram line 67 from Per-Albin-Hansson-Siedlung was cut to terminate at Reumannplatz. Also, a new network of bus services in the Favoriten area commenced. From the same date tram lines 2, 10, 44 and 60 saw major changes and Line 58 was replaced by extensions of lines 10 and 60.

== Lines ==
As of September 2026, these lines operated:

Line	Termini		Length	Depots	Media
1	Stefan-Fadinger-Platz	Prater, Hauptallee	10.52 km (6.54 mi)	Favoriten, Gürtel	commons
2	Friedrich-Engels-Platz	Dornbach	12.83 km (7.97 mi)	Brigittenau, Ottakring, Floridsdorf (1 car pm)	commons
5	Praterstern S U	Westbahnhof S U	7.87 km (4.89 mi)	Brigittenau, Rudolfsheim, Floridsorf (1 car pm)	commons
6	Burggasse-Stadthalle U	Geiereckstraße	7.39 km (4.59 mi)	Favoriten, Simmering	commons
9	Gersthof S Wallrißstraße	Westbahnhof S U	6.18 km (3.84 mi)	Hernals, Rudolfsheim	commons
10	Dornbach	Unter-St.-Veit; Hummelgasse	7.84 km (4.87 mi)	Ottakring, Speising, Rudolfsheim (1 car pm peak)	commons
11	Otto-Probst-Platz	Kaiserebersdorf; Zinnergasse	13.22 km (8.21 mi)	Favoriten, Simmering	commons
12	Josefstädter Straße U	Hillerstraße	8.7 km (5.4 mi)	Brigittenau	commons
18	Burggasse-Stadthalle U	Stadion U Handelskai	14.27 km (8.87 mi)	Rudolfsheim, Favoriten	commons
25	Aspern; Oberdorfstraße	Floridsdorf S U	9.42 km (5.85 mi)	Kagran	commons
26	Hausfeldstraße U	Strebersdorf; Meriangasse	11.88 km (7.38 mi)	Kagran, Floridsdorf	commons
27	Aspern Nord U	Strebersdorf Meriangasse	13.50 km (8.39 mi)	Kagran, Floridsdorf	commons
30	Floridsdorf S U	Stammersdorf	5.27 km (3.27 mi)	Brigittenau (3 cars ex FLOR), Floridsdorf	commons
31	Schottenring U	Stammersdorf	11.21 km (6.97 mi)	Floridsdorf	commons
37	Schottentor U	Hohe Warte	4.78 km (2.97 mi)	Gürtel	commons
38	Schottentor U	Grinzing	5.33 km (3.31 mi)	Gürtel	commons
40	Schottentor U	Herbeckstraße	4.43 km (2.75 mi)	Gürtel, Hernals	commons
41	Schottentor U	Pötzleinsdorf	5.12 km (3.18 mi)	Gürtel, Hernals	commons
42	Schottentor U	Antonigasse	3.38 km (2.10 mi)	Gürtel, Hernals (1 car pm peak)	commons
43	Schottentor U	Neuwaldegg	5.99 km (3.72 mi)	Hernals	commons
44	Schottentor U	Maroltingergasse	4.39 km (2.73 mi)	Ottakring	commons
46	Parlament/Volkstheater U	Joachimsthalerplatz	4.80 km (2.98 mi)	Ottakring, Rudolfsheim (1 car pm peak)	commons
49	Parlament/Volkstheater U	Hütteldorf; Bujattigasse	8.54 km (5.31 mi)	Rudolfsheim, Ottakring	commons
52	Westbahnhof S U	Baumgarten	5.78 km (3.59 mi)	Rudolfsheim	commons
60	Westbahnhof S U	Rodaun	11.10 km (6.90 mi)	Rudolfsheim, Speising	commons
62	Quartier Belvedere	Lainz; Wolkersbergenstraße	10.99 km (6.83 mi)	Speising	commons
71	Schottenring	Kaiserebersdorf; Zinnergasse	12.93 km (8.03 mi)	Simmering	commons
D	Absberggasse	Nußdorf; Beethovengang	11.74 km (7.29 mi)	Favoriten, Gürtel	commons
O	Raxstraße	Bruno-Marek-Allee	9.11 km (5.66 mi)	Favoriten	commons

The longest line is currently line 11, running 13.2 km (8.2 mi) from Otto-Probst-Platz near the Wienerberg via the districts of Favoriten and Simmering to Kaiserebersdorf. On the other hand, line 42 is the shortest route, only covering 3.4 km (2.1 mi) from Schottentor to its terminus at Antonigasse in the district of Währing.

== Fleet ==
The Vienna tram fleet consists of both high-floor and low-floor vehicles. On weekdays, some lines operate with a combination of high and low-floor trams, but on weekends (especially Sundays), only a limited number of high-floor trams are used on lines D, 2, 5, 25, 31, 38 and VRT. Low-floor trams were successively introduced from 1995, most recently on line 33 in September 2011. This allowed all tram stops in Vienna to be served by such vehicles, thus providing step-free travel throughout the entire network.

=== High-floor trams ===
From 1959, articulated tramcars of Type E were used. However, it became difficult to operate these trams with trailer cars due to their underpowered motors, necessitating their replacements soon afterwards.

The successors, the Type E_{1} trams, were first delivered in 1966. They were of similar appearance to their predecessors, but equipped with more powerful motors. The Type E remained in service until 2007, most recently on lines 10 and 62. E1 had its last day in regular service on July 1, 2022, this on line 30.

After production of the E_{1} ceased in 1976, a further successor generation, the Type E_{2}, was developed, and has been in service since 1978.

The trailer fleet constructed to match the tramcars is made up of Types c_{4} for the E_{1} tramcars, and Type c_{5} for E_{2} tramcars. On less frequented lines, the tramcars also operated without trailers.

Following a number of serious accidents, the majority of the high-floor trams have been fitted with electric door edge sensors and rear-view mirrors.

==== Tramcars (not air-conditioned) ====
- Type E_{1} – originally 338 cars – built 1966–1976; seats: 40, standing places: 65. (withdrawn as of July 1, 2022)
- Type E_{2} – 118 cars (June 2021) (originally 122) – built 1978–1990; seats: 44, standing places: 58 (withdrawal planned for 2026)

==== Trailers (not air-conditioned) ====
- Type c_{4} – originally 73 – built 1974–1977 (June 2021); seats: 31, standing places: 43 (withdrawn as of July 1, 2022, together with tramcar E_{1})
- Type c_{5} – 115 cars (originally 117) – built 1978–1990; seats: 32, standing places: 39
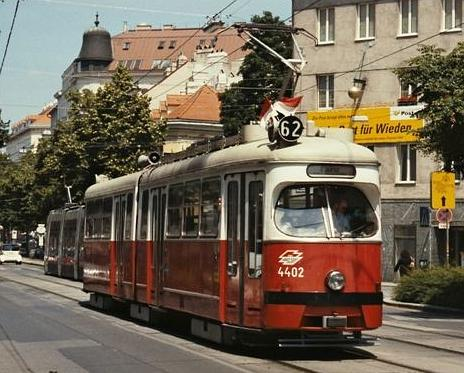
Type E – in service to 2007.

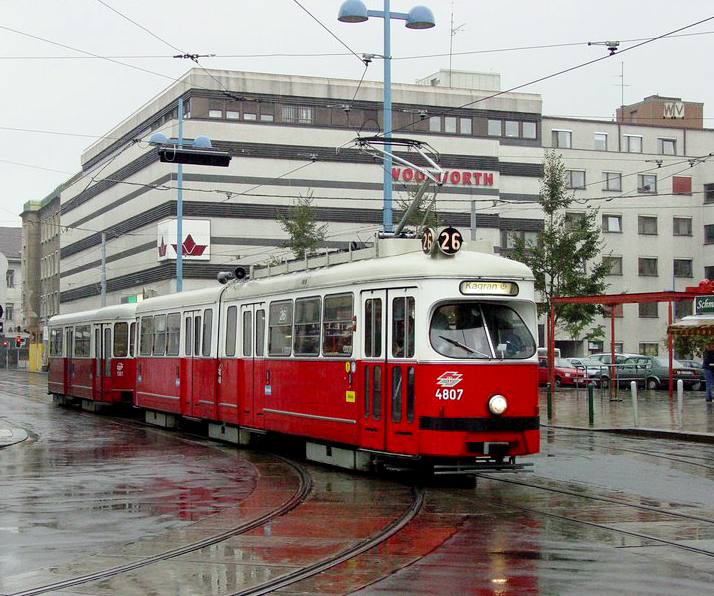
Tramcar E_{1} + Trailer c_{4}.

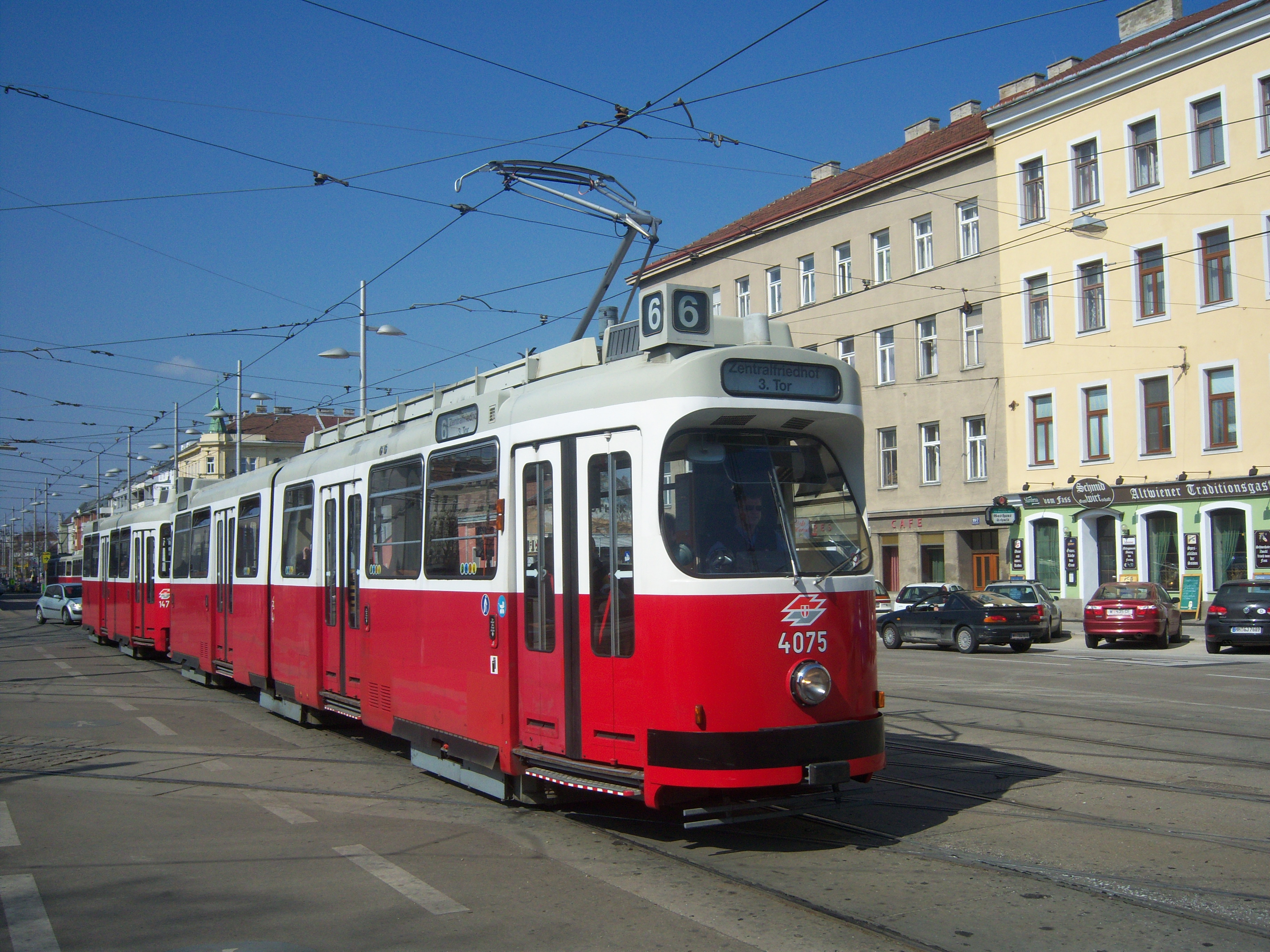
Type E_{2}+c_{5}.

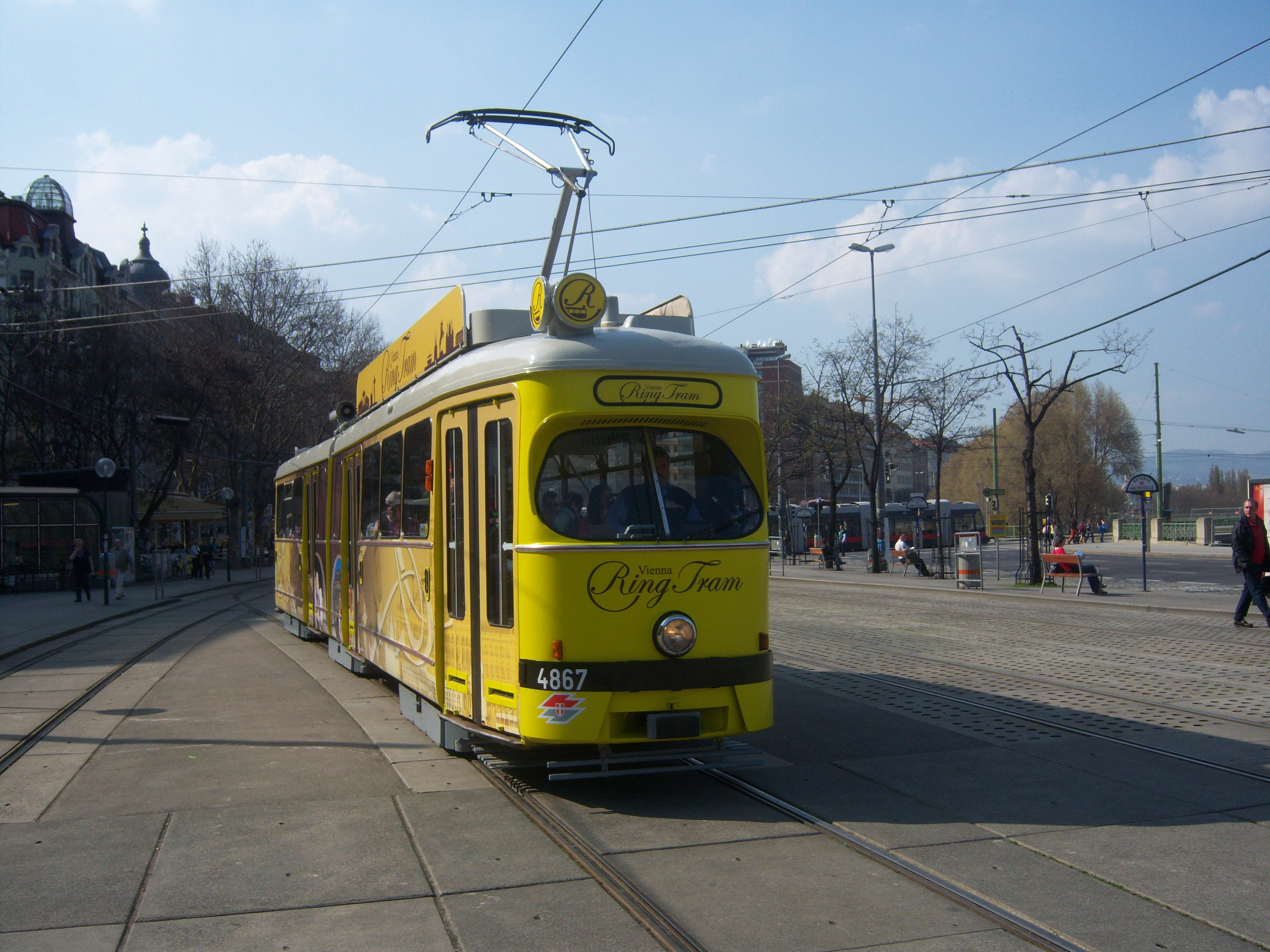
Vienna Ring Tram Type E_{1}.

=== Low-floor trams ===
==== Ultra Low Floor (ULF) ====
The articulated Ultra Low Floor (ULF) trams, built by a consortium composed of Siemens and ELIN, come in two lengths: Type A, a short version with five sections, and Type B, a longer, seven-section version.

Since 1995, one prototype of each length operated on the network. Since 1997, series production versions of both types have been in service.

Type A_{1}, a further development of Type A, has been in service since 2007 as the first generation of Vienna tramcars to be fitted with air conditioning. These cars have an updated interior design (yellow handrails, gray walls and red plastic seats) and door-closing indicator lights. They are currently used on lines O, 9, 10, 33, 37, 42, 44, 46, 52 and 62. Deliveries of the longer ULF version, Type B_{1}, began in April 2009, and are currently found on lines D, 1, 2, 5, 6, 18, 25, 26, 31, 38, 40, 41, 43, 49, 60, 67 and 71.

After a fire in one of the low-floor trams in July 2009, it was decided to retrofit all of them with special fenders.

Since 2014, six seats in the second and last sections of Type B and B_{1} trams have been permanently removed and replaced with two folding seats and 16 standing places to accelerate passenger transfer and increase capacity.

===== Non-air-conditioned trams =====
- Type A – 51 cars (Fleet no. 1 to 51) – built 1995–2006; seats: 42, standing places: 94.
- Type B – 100 cars – (Fleet no. 601 to 701) - built 1995–2005; seats: 66, standing places: 141.

===== Air-conditioned trams =====
- Type A_{1} – 80 cars (Fleet no. 52 to 131) – built 2006–2015; seats: 42, standing places: 94.
- Type B_{1} – 100 cars ( Fleet no. 702 to 801) – built 2009–2017; seats: 66, standing places: 143.

==== Bombardier Flexity Wien ====
In 2015, Bombardier Transportation's specially designed Flexity Wien series won against the ULF from Siemens in a tender for 119 new trams, including an option for a further 37 units, purchased with a maintenance agreement. The trams, based on the Adtranz Incentro design, are 34 metres in length and have six double-leaf doors, one fewer than the long ULFs. They have a capacity of 211 and a floor height of 215 millimetres to provide ground-level boarding. They are produced in Bombardier's Vienna factory and have been delivered to Wiener Linen since the end of 2017, entering service out of Favoriten depot in December 2018, initially on line 67 and later lines 6, 11, 18 and 71. Internally designated as Type D, they will gradually replace the last high-floor vehicles in the existing fleet.

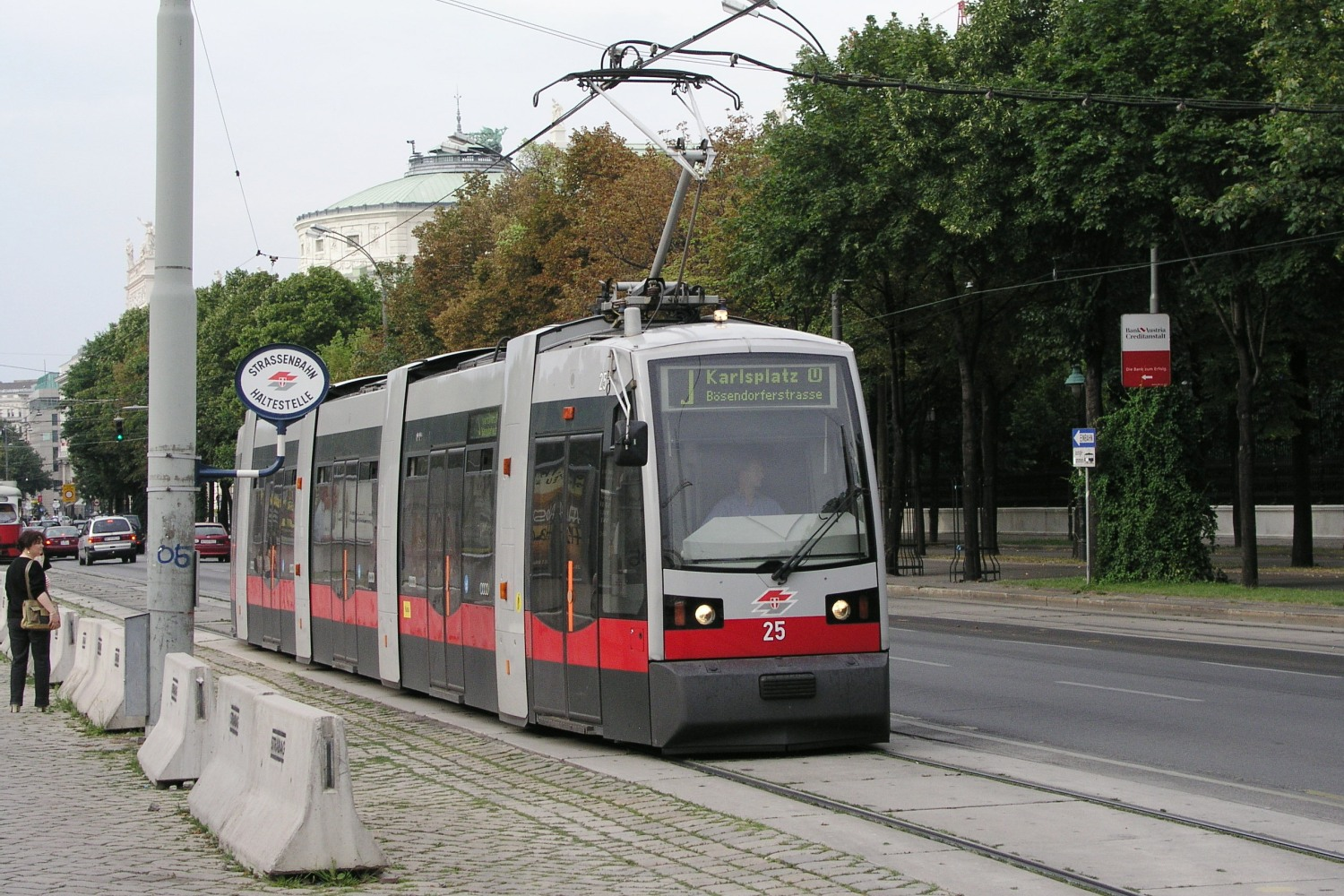
Siemens ULF type A tram.

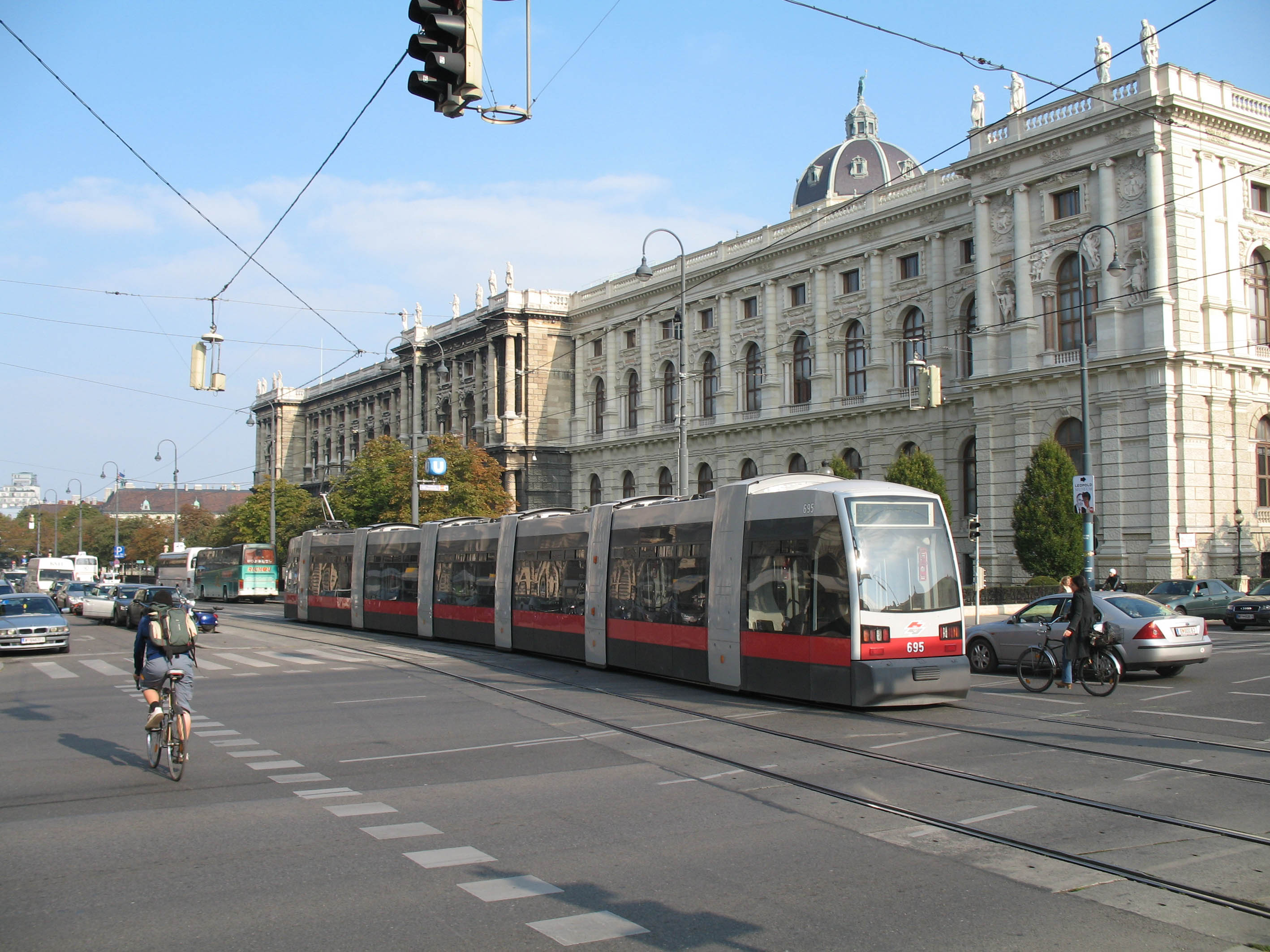
ULF type B.

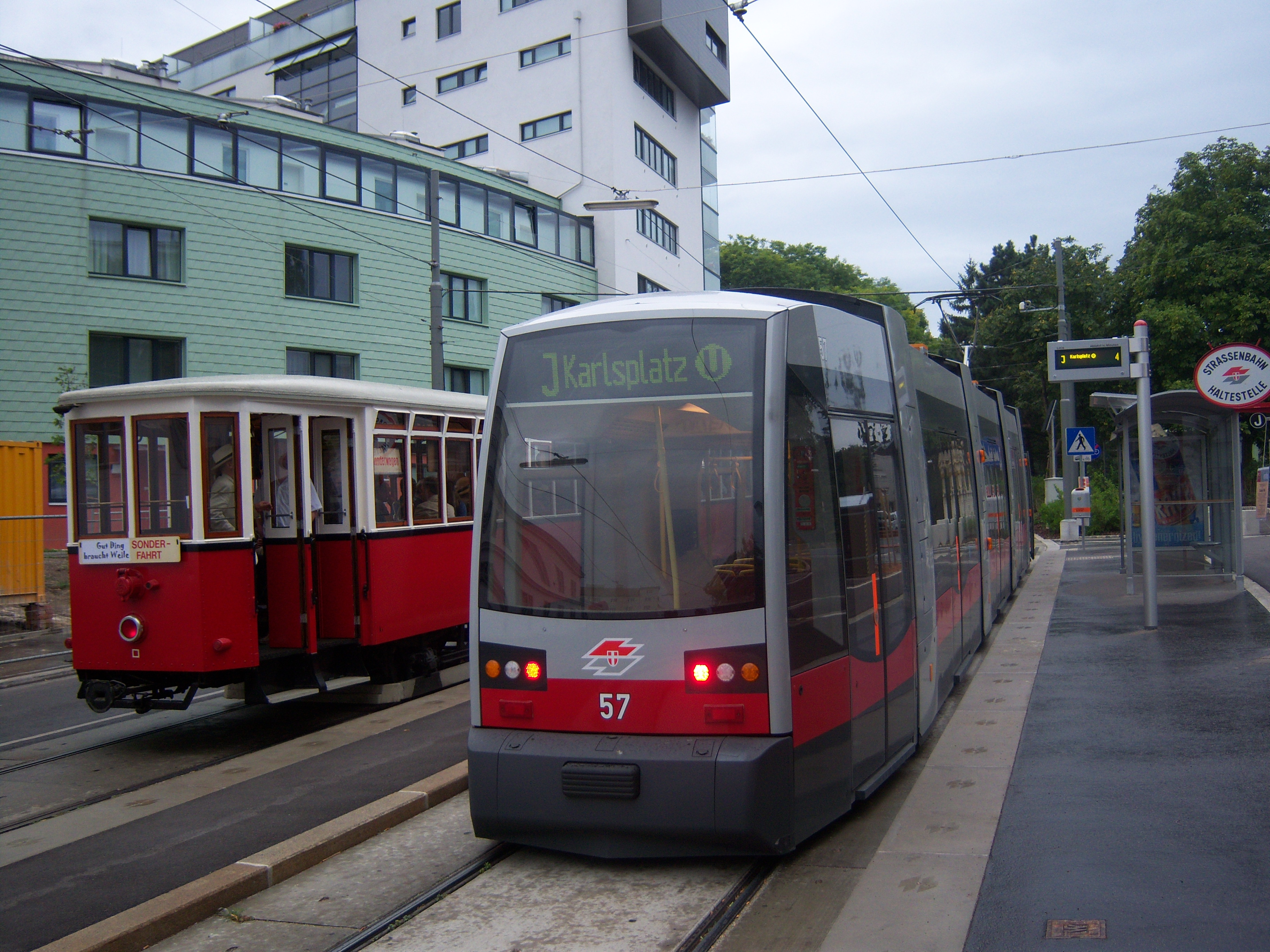
Heritage tram and Type A_{1}.

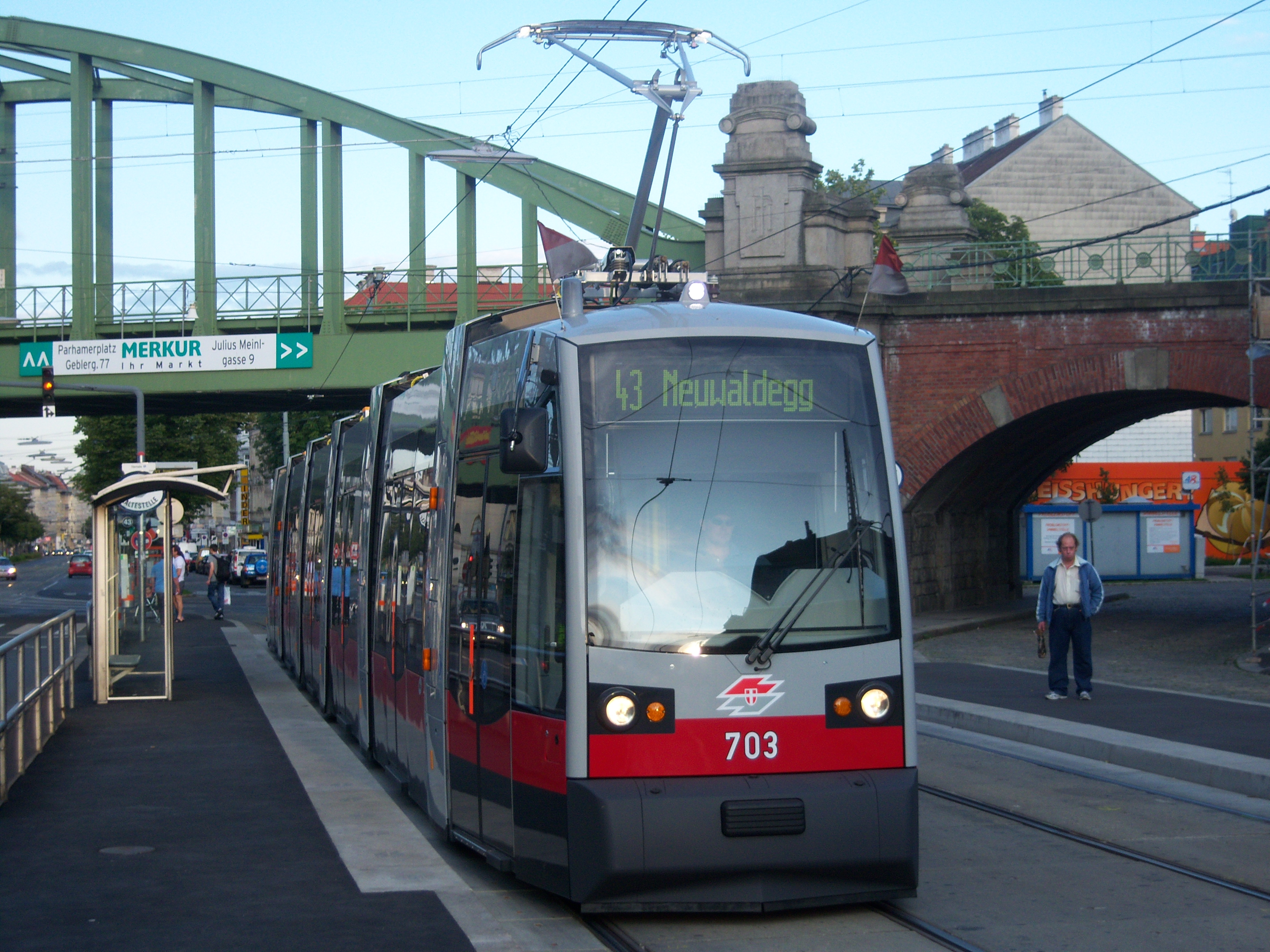
Type B_{1} at Hernals station.

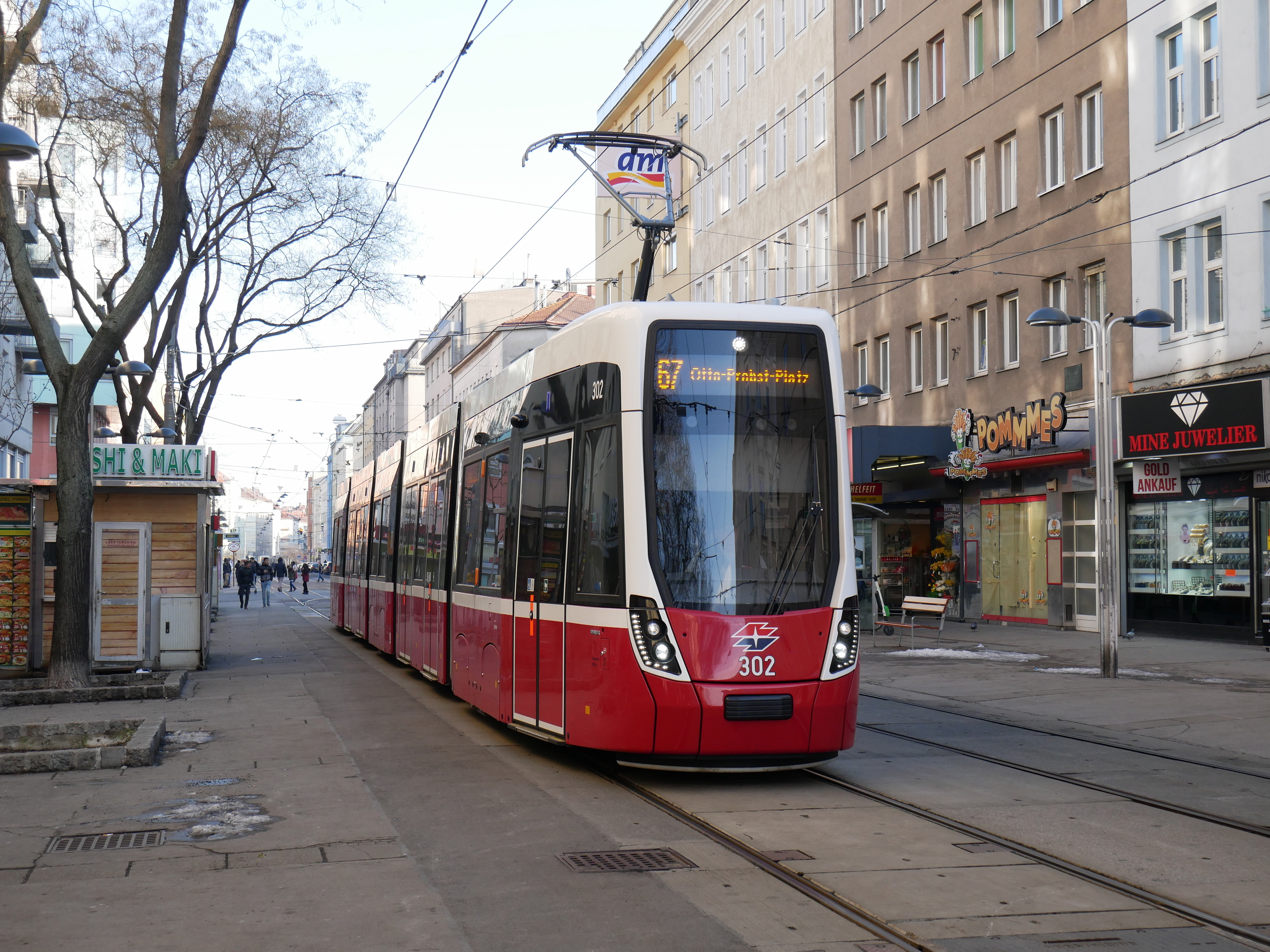
Bombardier Flexity Wien

== Depots ==
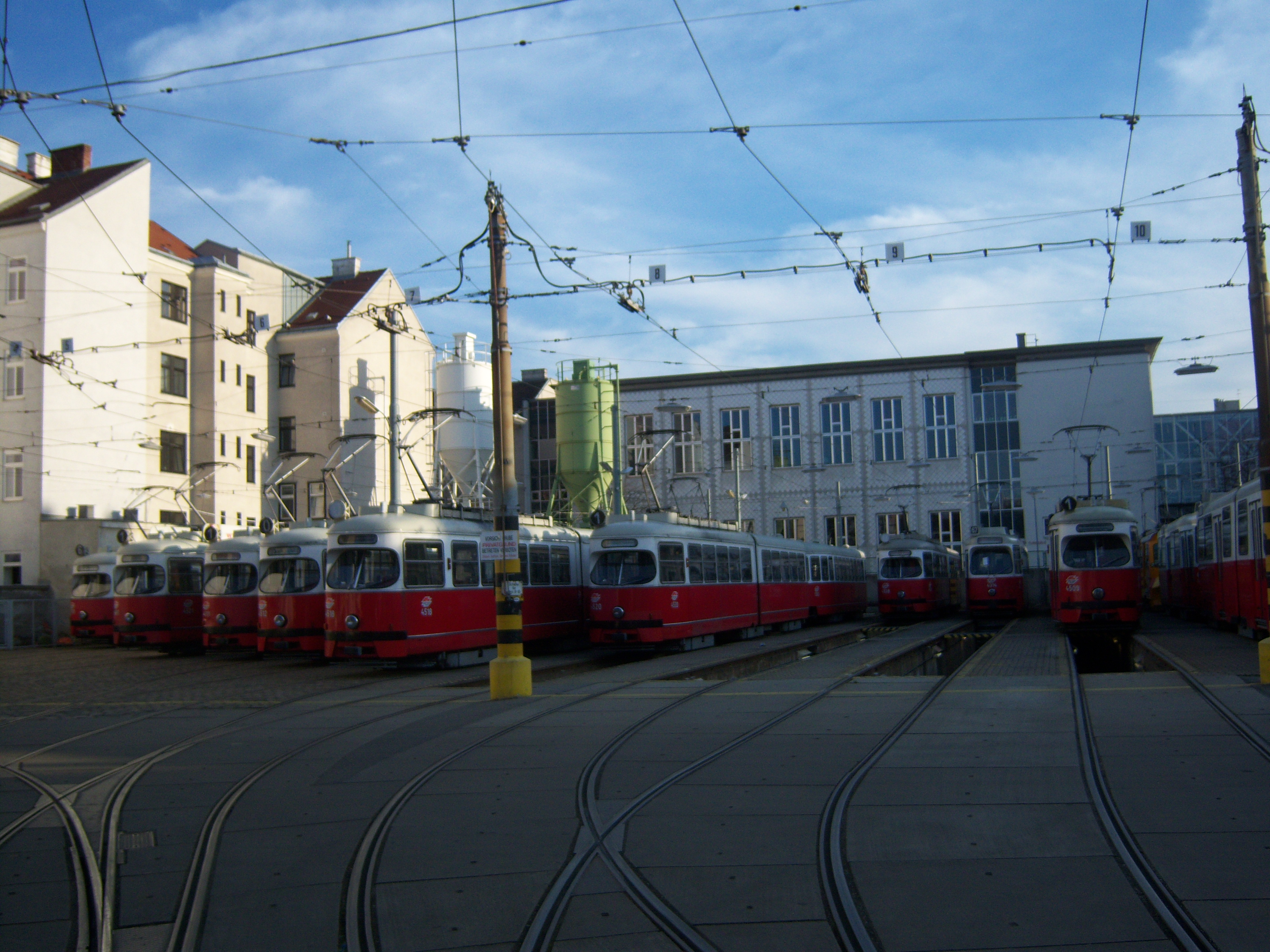
Favoriten depot

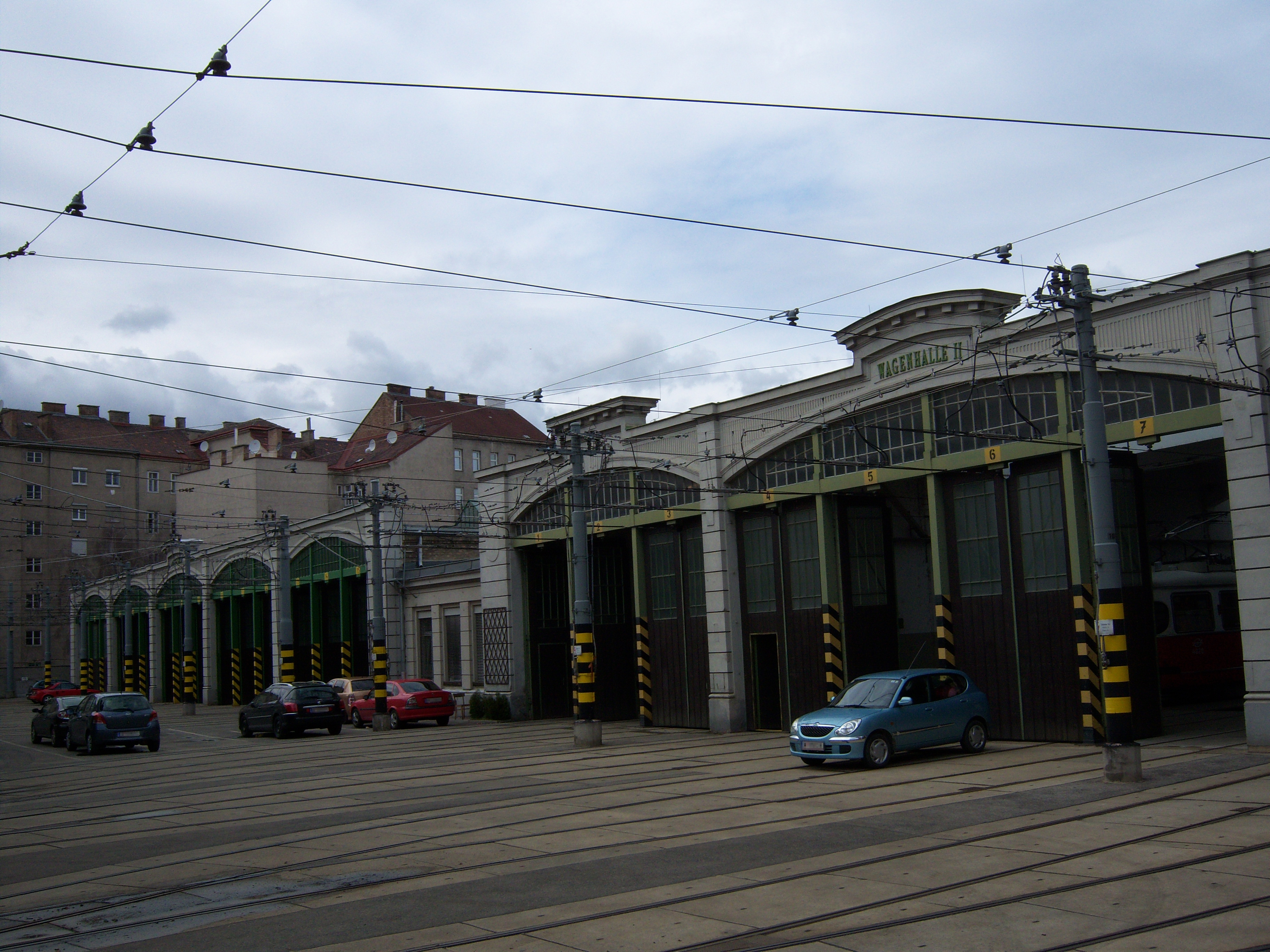
Brigittenau parking facility

Throughout its history, the Vienna tramway network has had a variety of Remisen ("carriage houses"), which were officially described as depots or stations. Due to the abandonment of numerous lines, some of these facilities have now been closed for trams (e.g., 2., Vorgartenstraße, 3., Erdberg, 12., Assmayergasse, 14., Breitensee, 15., Linke Wienzeile, 18., Währing, 22., Kagran). A few of them have nevertheless remained in use as operating garages for buses. In 2006, the now former Breitensee depot became the most recently abandoned facility, with its tram fleet being taken over by the Rudolfsheim station.

In recent years, as part of conservation measures, some depots have been gradually closed down as a separate unit, demoted to the status of so-called Abstellanlagen ("parking facilities"), and placed under a different depot. Currently, there are four operating depots in the Vienna tramway network and six parking facilities, as well as the Erdberg station, where the Vienna Tram Museum is housed. Repair work is now performed mostly in the remaining depots, where all vehicles are now officially stationed. The depots are split into the following sectors; North - Floridsdorf, Brigittenau and Kagran, Central - Hernals and Gurtel, South - Favoriten and Simmering, West - Rudolfsheim, Ottakring and Speising.

Certain Lines or vehicles are assigned to each depot or parking facility:

Name	Symbol	Lines	Vehicles	Address	Nearest stop
Favoriten depot	FAV	D, O, 1, 6, 11, 18, VRT, U2Z	A, A_{1}, B, B_{1}, D, E_{1}, E_{2}, c_{5}	10., Gudrunstraße 153	Quellenplatz
Simmering parking facility	SIM	D, 11, 71	B, B_{1}, E_{2}, c_{5}	11., Simmeringer Hauptstraße 156	Fickeysstraße
Floridsdorf depot	FLOR	2 (1xPM), 5 (1xPM), 25, 26, 30, 31, 33	A, B, B_{1}, E_{1}, E_{2}, c_{4}, c_{5}	21., Gerichtsgasse 5	Floridsdorfer Markt
Brigittenau parking facility	BRG	O, 2, 5, 33	A, B, B_{1}, E_{2}, c_{5}	20., Wexstraße 13	Wexstraße
Kagran parking facility	KAG	2, 25, 26	B, B_{1}, E_{1}, c_{4}	22., Prandaugasse 11	Kagran
Hernals depot	HLS	2, 9, 40, 41, 42, 43	A, A_{1}, B, B_{1}, E_{2}, c_{5}	17., Hernalser Hauptstraße 138	Wattgasse
Gürtel parking facility	GTL	D, 1, 37, 38, 40, 41, 42	A, A_{1}, B, B_{1}, E_{2}, c_{5}	18., Währinger Gürtel 131	Nußdorfer Straße
Rudolfsheim depot	RDH	5, 9, 18, 49, 52, 60	A, A_{1}, B, B_{1}, E_{2}, c_{5}	15., Schwendergasse 51	Anschützgasse
Ottakring parking facility	OTG	10, 44, 46, 49	A, A_{1}, B, B_{1}	16., Joachimsthalerplatz 1	Joachimsthalerplatz
Speising parking facility	SPEIS	10, 49, 52, 60, 62	A, A_{1}, B, B_{1}, E_{2}, c_{5}	13., Hetzendorfer Straße 188	Wattmanngasse

Heavier maintenance, along with periodic servicing, is performed in the Main Workshops of the Wiener Linien.

== See also ==
- Transportation in Vienna
- Vienna U-Bahn
- Vienna S-Bahn
- Wiener Lokalbahnen
- List of town tramway systems in Austria
- European Tramdriver Championship
