= Thaliastraße station =

Vienna U-Bahn station

Thaliastrasse Thaliastraße
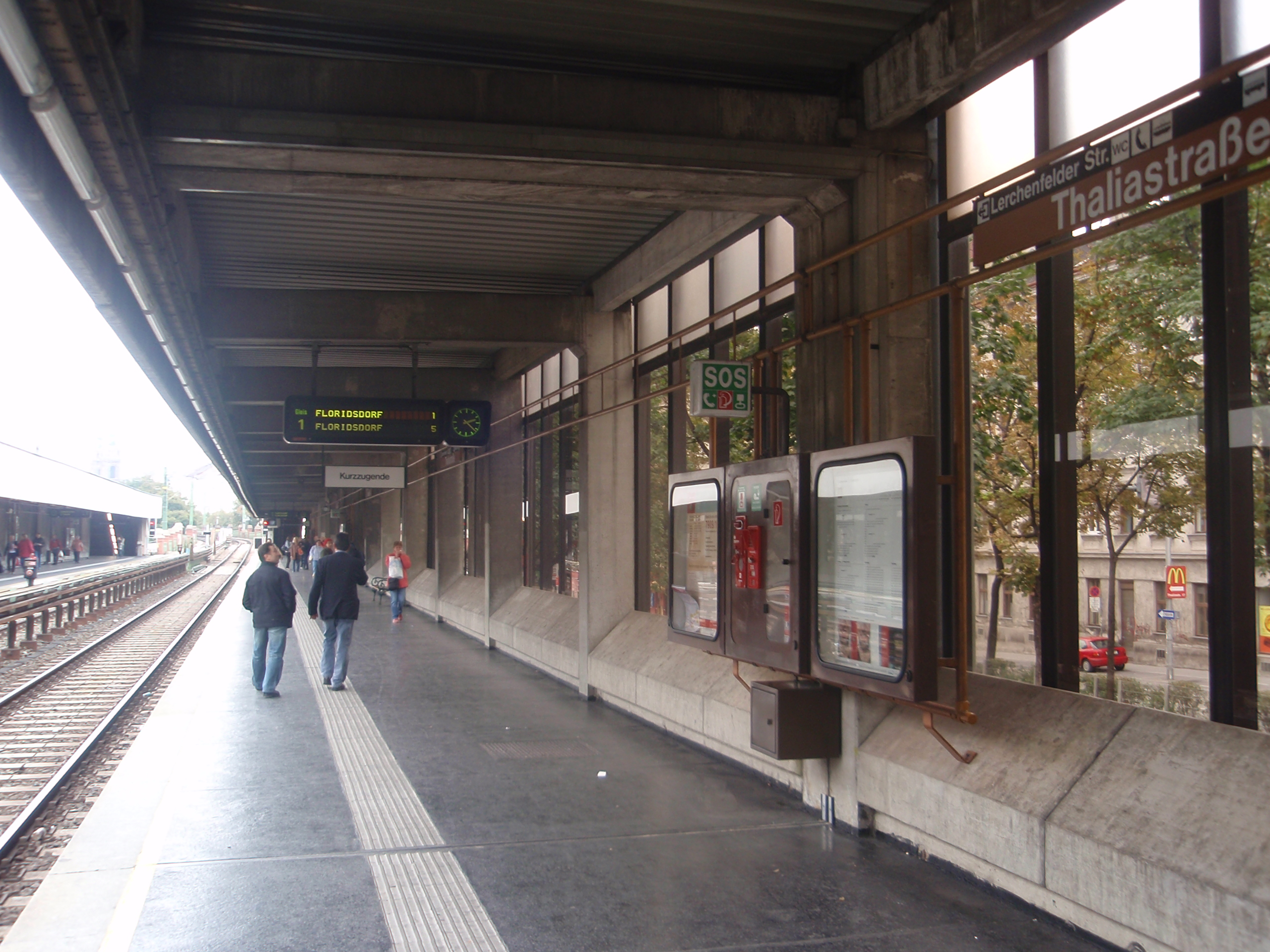

General information
- Location: Ottakring, Vienna; Austria
- Coordinates: 48.2078°N 16.3380°E

History
- Opened: 7 October 1989

Services
| Preceding station | Wiener Linien | Following station |
|---|---|---|
| Josefstädter Straße toward Floridsdorf | U6 | Burggasse-Stadthalle toward Siebenhirten |
Location

Thaliastrasse is a station on U6 of the Vienna U-Bahn. It is located in the Ottakring District. It opened in 1989. It is named after the Thalia Theature.
