= Burggasse-Stadthalle station =

Vienna U-Bahn station

Burggasse-Stadthalle
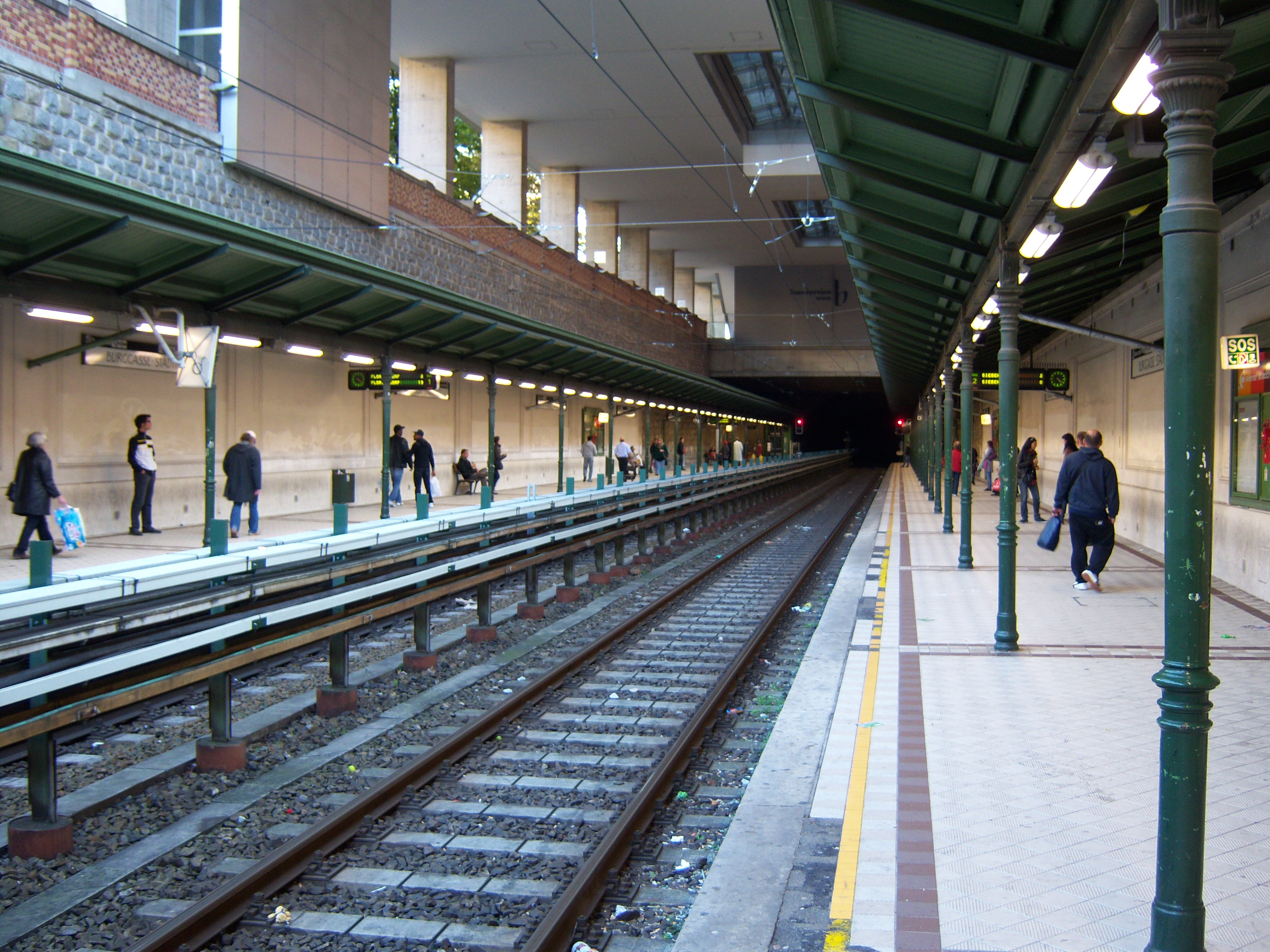

General information
- Location: Rudolfsheim-Fünfhaus, Vienna; Austria
- Coordinates: 48.2020°N 16.3374°E

History
- Opened: 7 October 1989

Services
Preceding station	Wiener Linien	Following station
Thaliastraße toward Floridsdorf	U6	Westbahnhof toward Siebenhirten
Location

Burggasse-Stadthalle is a station on U6 of the Vienna U-Bahn. It is located in the Rudolfsheim-Fünfhaus District. It opened in 1989.
