= Braunschweiggasse station =

Vienna U-Bahn station

Braunschweiggasse
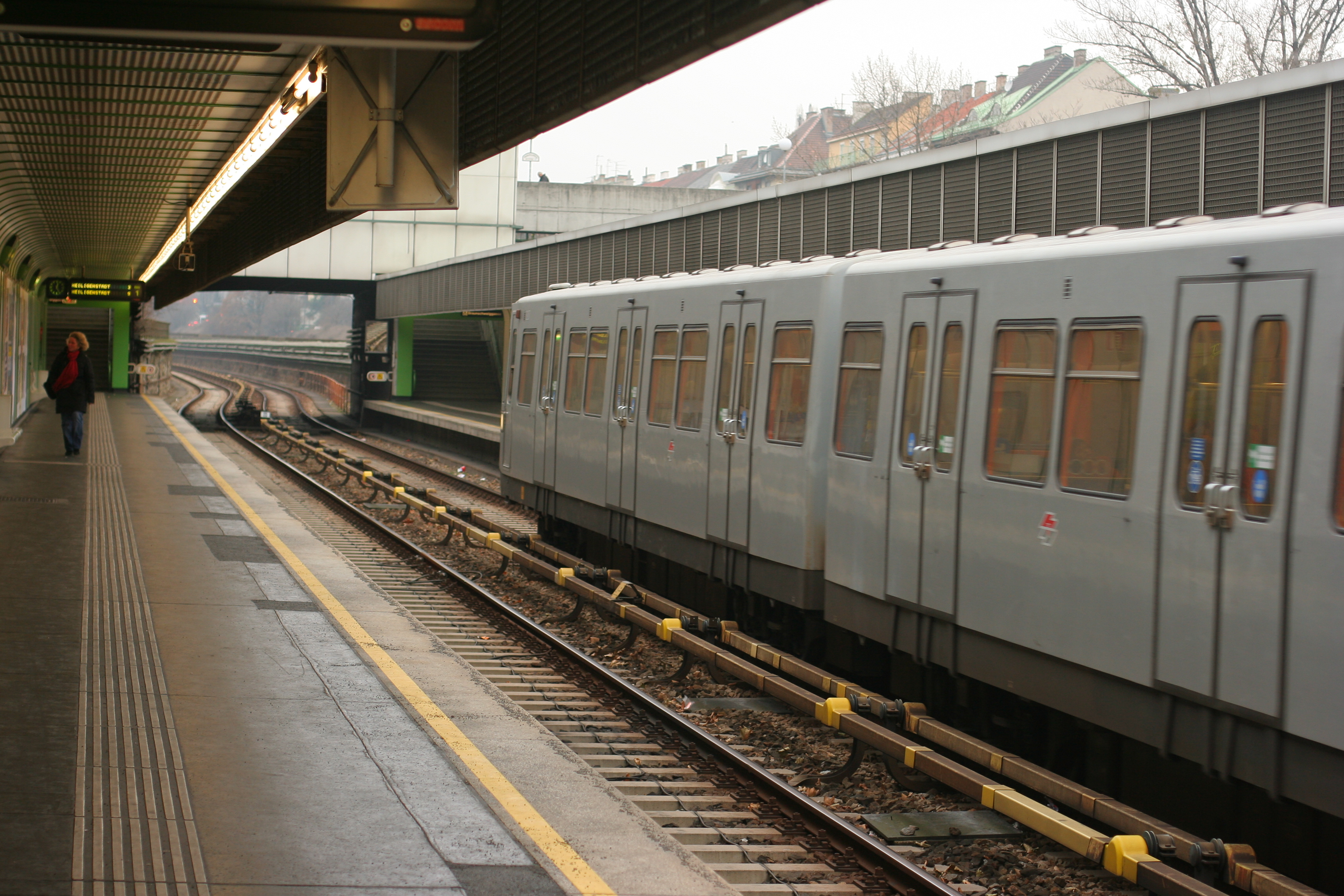

General information
- Location: Hietzing, Vienna; Austria
- Coordinates: 48.1894°N 16.2958°E

History
- Opened: 20 December 1981

Services
Preceding station	Wiener Linien	Following station
Unter St. Veit toward Hütteldorf	U4	Hietzing toward Heiligenstadt
Location

Braunschweiggasse is a station on U4 of the Vienna U-Bahn. It is located in the Hietzing District.

== History ==
Braunschweiggasse (lit. Brunswick alley) got its name from William, Duke of Brunswick (Braunschweig is Brunswick in German.)

The station was built for the Wientallinie of the Viennese Metropolitan Railway (Stadtbahn), which ran between the stations Hütteldorf and Meidling Hauptstraße in 1898. In 1925, the Stadtbahn switched from steam power to electric power. The old architecture, based on Otto Wagner's style, was lost in a strategic bombing raid on 21 February 1945. Although the Stadtbahn was reopened on 25 July 1945, the station was not reopened until 28 November 1948. From 1979 to 1984, the station was renovated again into what it looks like today.
