= Ober St. Veit station =

Vienna U-Bahn station

Ober St. Veit
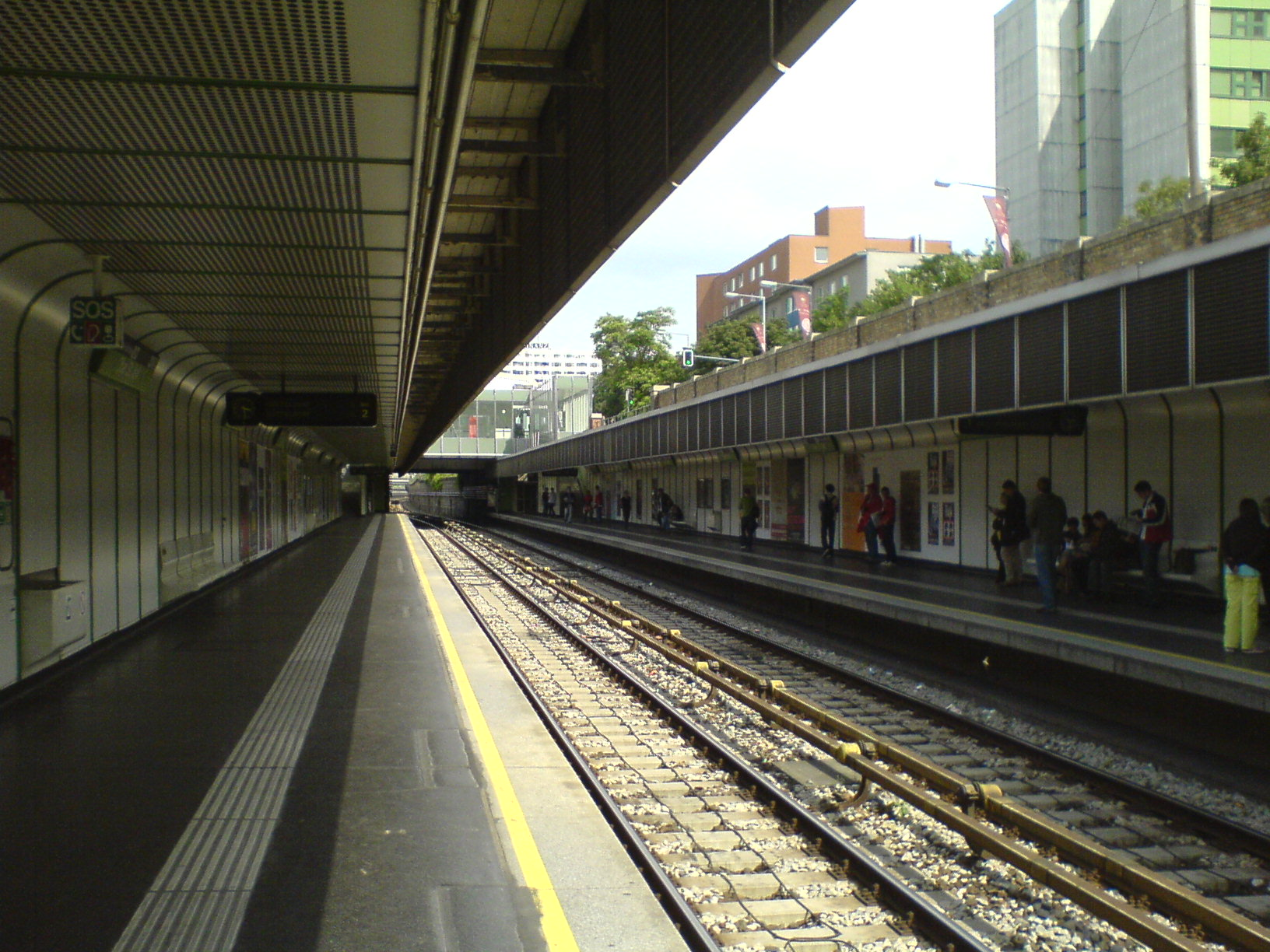

General information
- Location: Hietzing, Vienna; Austria
- Coordinates: 48.1923°N 16.2759°E

History
- Opened: 20 December 1981

Services
Preceding station	Wiener Linien	Following station
Hütteldorf Terminus	U4	Unter St. Veit toward Heiligenstadt
Location

Ober St. Veit is a station on U4 of the Vienna U-Bahn. It is located in the Hietzing District. It opened in 1981.

== History ==
Ober St. Veit is named after Ober Sankt Veit, one of the 9 district sections of Hietzing.

The station was built for the Wientallinie of the Viennese Metropolitan Railway (Stadtbahn), which ran between the stations Hütteldorf and Meidling Hauptstraße in 1898. It was opened on 1 June 1898. In 1925, the Stadtbahn switched from steam power to electric power. Unlike other stations along the Wientallinie of the Stadtbahn, this station was barely damaged during the Second World War. The station building, designed with Otto Wagner's architectural style, still remains standing to this day, but the rest of the station was completely renovated in 1977. It was reopened to the public on 20 December 1981, along with the opening of the U4 subway line. Another entrance to the station with elevators was built - this was opened to the public on 21 December 2001.
