= Schönbrunn station =

Vienna U-Bahn station

Schönbrunn
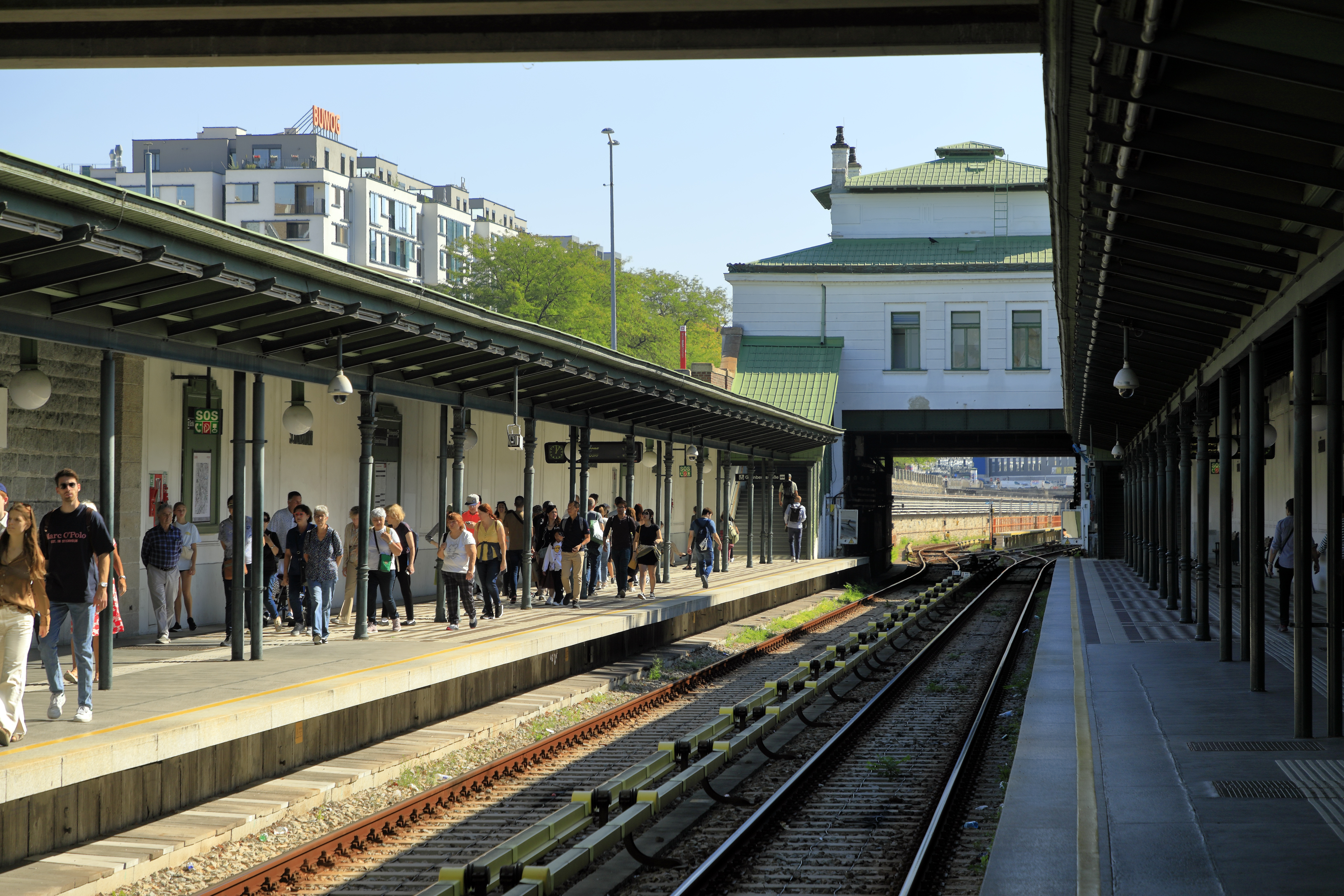

General information
- Location: Hietzing, Vienna; Austria
- Coordinates: 48.186°N 16.319°E

History
- Opened: 1898

Services
Preceding station	Wiener Linien	Following station
Hietzing toward Hütteldorf	U4	Meidling Hauptstraße toward Heiligenstadt
Location

Schönbrunn is a station on U4 of the Vienna U-Bahn. It is located in the Hietzing District. It opened as part of the Wiener Stadtbahn in 1898 and became an U-Bahn station in 1981.
