= Hietzing station =

Vienna U-Bahn station

Hietzing
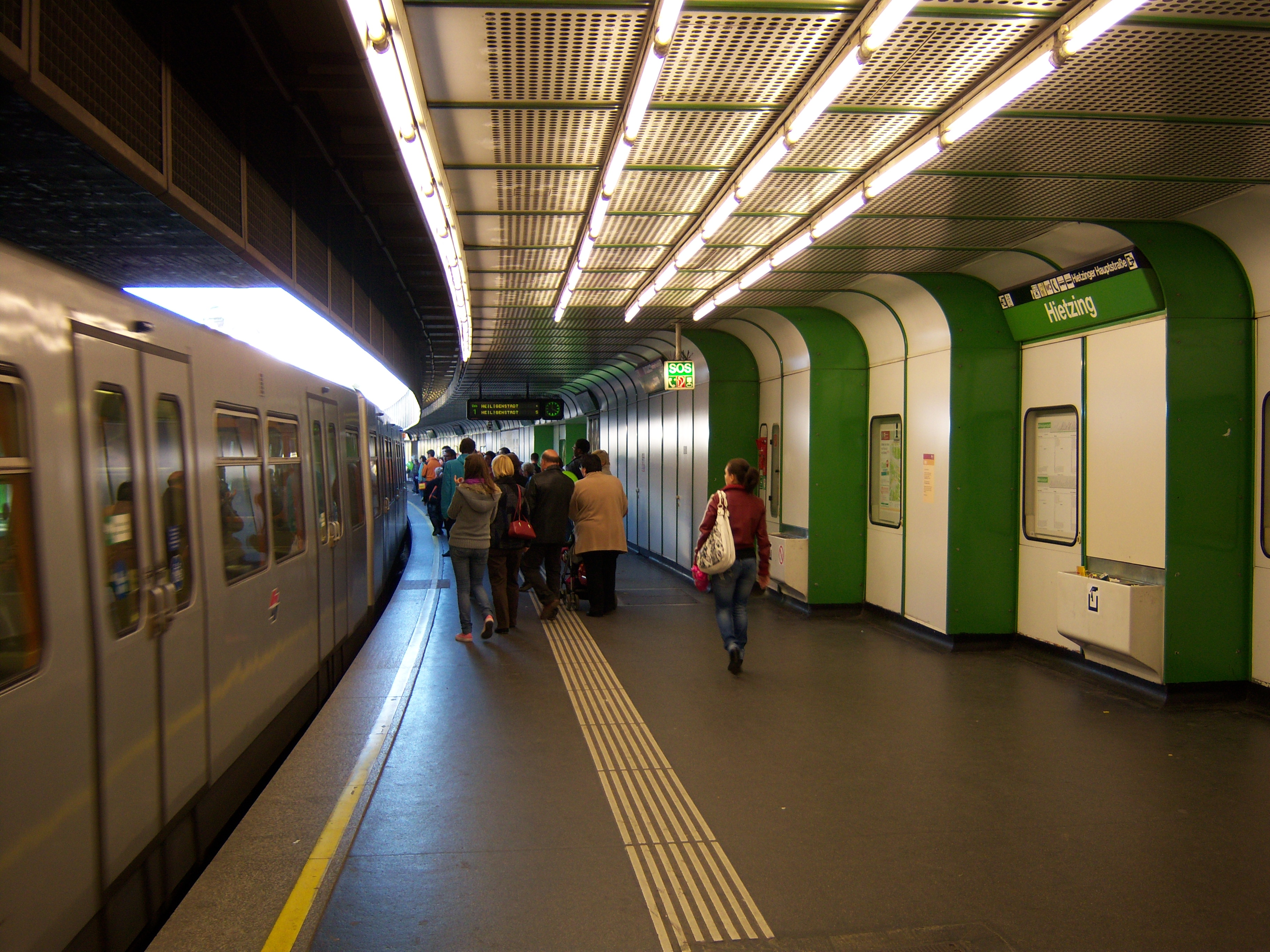

General information
- Location: Hietzing, Vienna; Austria
- Coordinates: 48.1876°N 16.3048°E

History
- Opened: 1898

Services
Preceding station	Wiener Linien	Following station
Braunschweiggasse toward Hütteldorf	U4	Schönbrunn toward Heiligenstadt
Location

Hietzing (German pronunciation: [ˈhɪtsɪŋ]) is a station on U4 of the Vienna U-Bahn. It is located beside the canalised Vienna River, on the border of the Viennese districts Hietzing and Penzing, and at the north-western corner of the grounds of the Schönbrunn Palace. It opened as part of the Wiener Stadtbahn in 1898 and became an U-Bahn station in 1981.

The entrance to the station is at the western end of the platforms, on a bridge crossing the U4 line and the Vienna River. The station is integrated with an interchange that also hosts stops for lines 10 and 60 of the Vienna tramway, and bus routes 51A, 51B, 56A, 56B, 58A and 58B.

At the eastern end of the station platforms, the track is straddled by a pavilion that was designed by Otto Wagner, who was responsible the artistic design of the Stadtbahn. The pavilion was intended as a private entrance to the Stadtbahn for the use of the Emperor Franz Joseph, although it was only used by him on two occasions. The pavilion was given a distinctive exterior and an Art Nouveau interior for its intended use. The pavilion, known as the Hofpavillon, is no longer connected to the station platforms, but is open to visitors as one of the sites of the Vienna Museum.

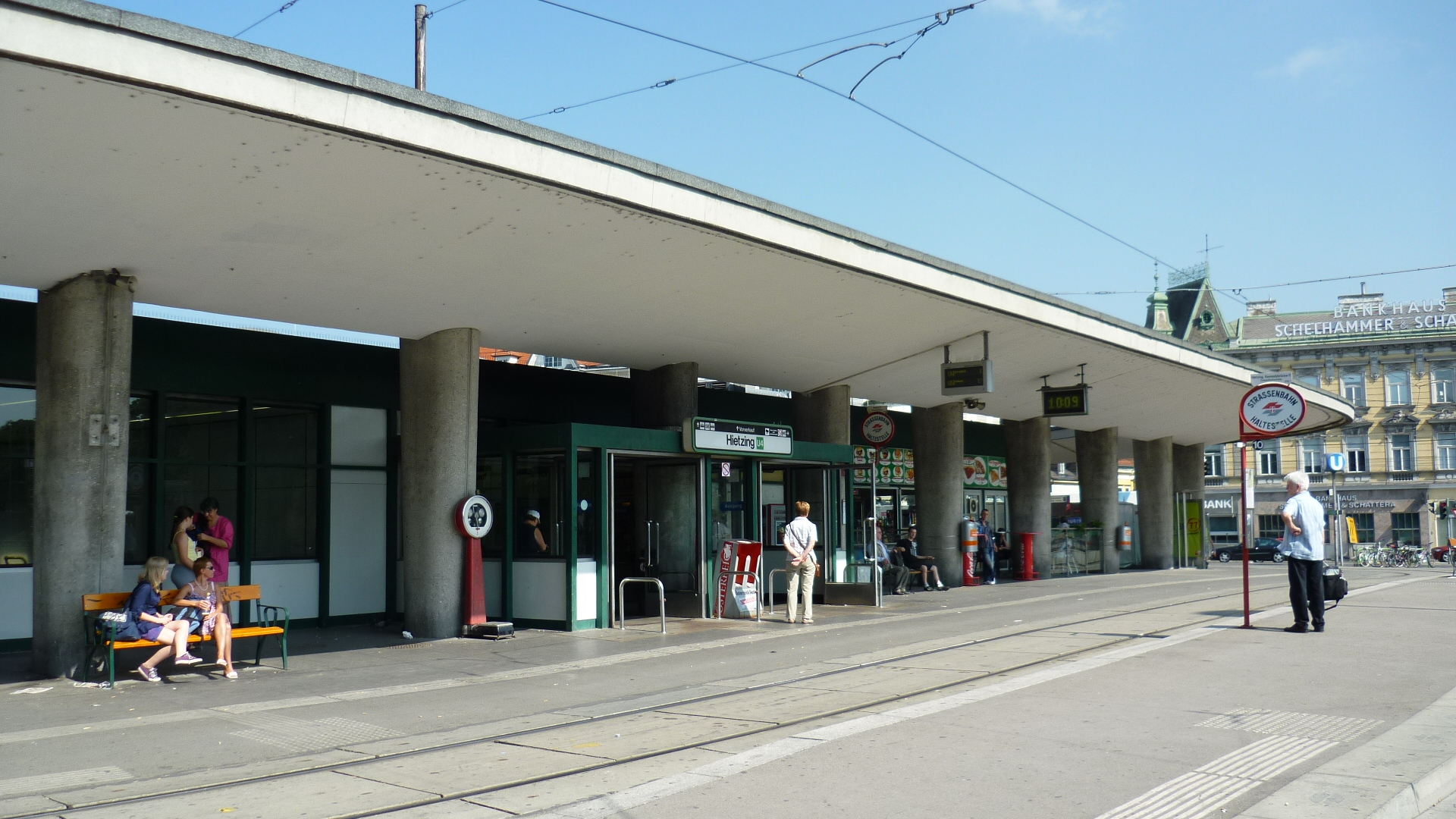
The station entrance

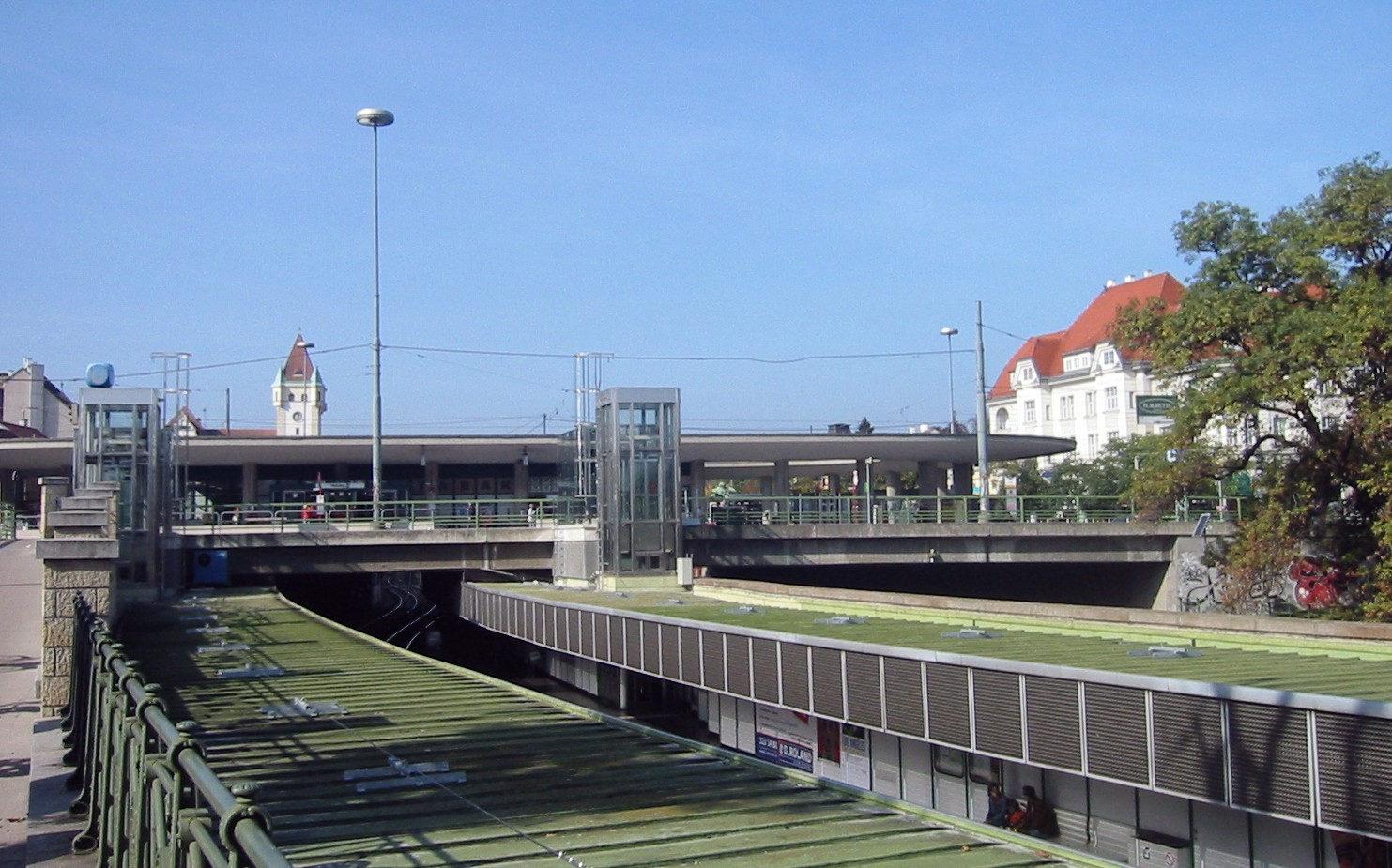
The station building and bridge

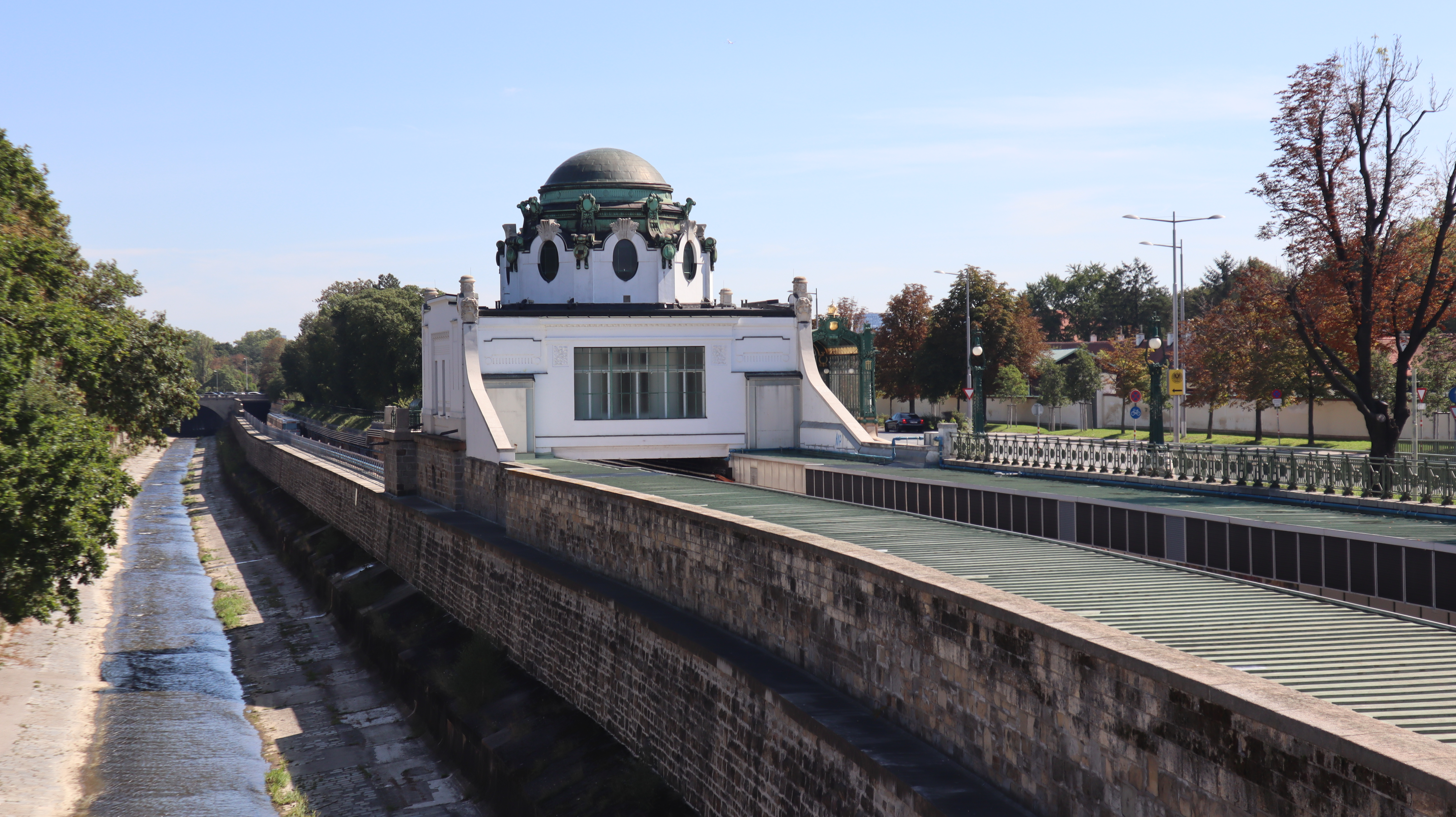
The Vienna River beside the station

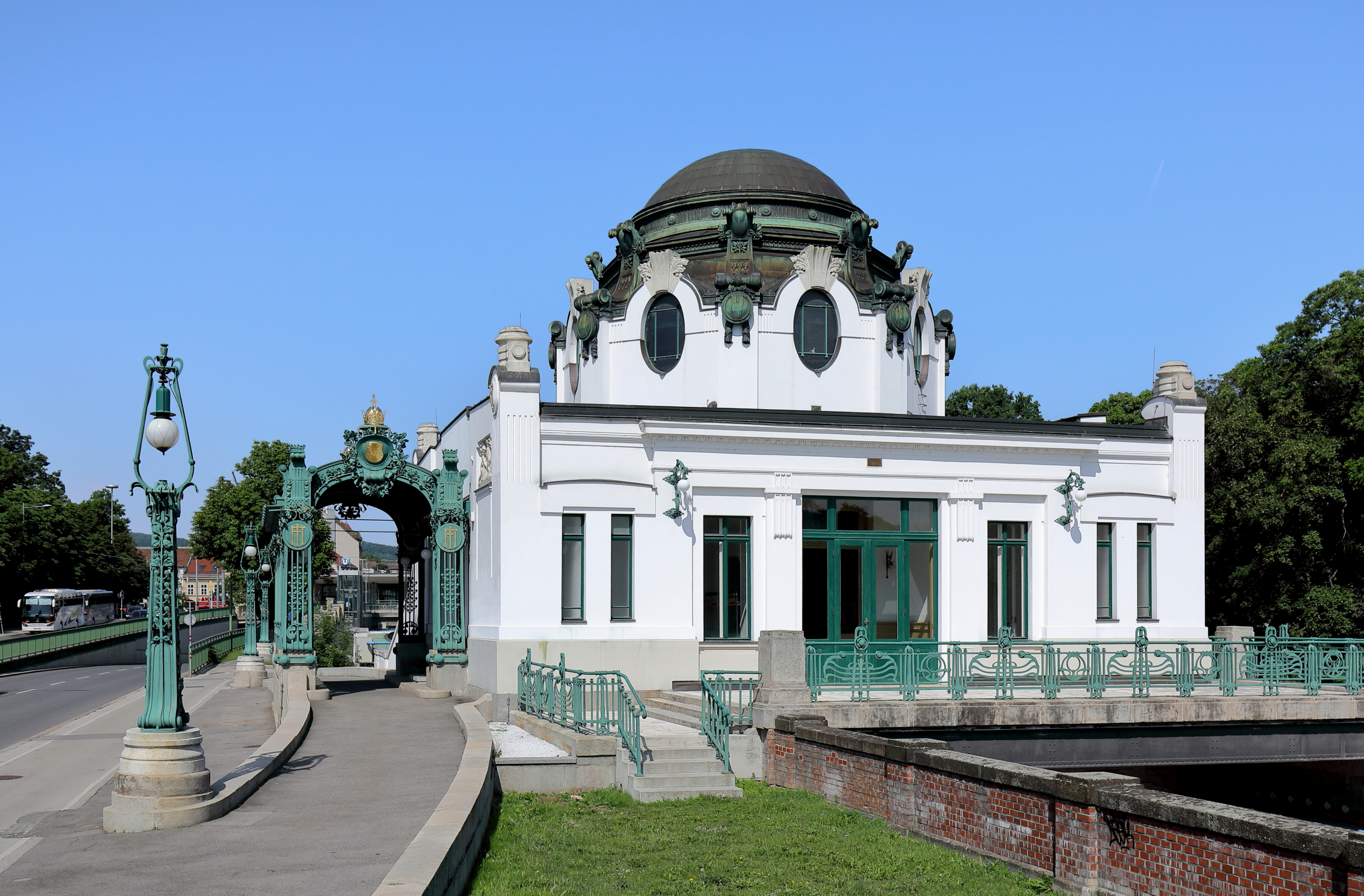
The Hofpavillon
