= Unter St. Veit station =

Vienna U-Bahn station

Unter St. Veit
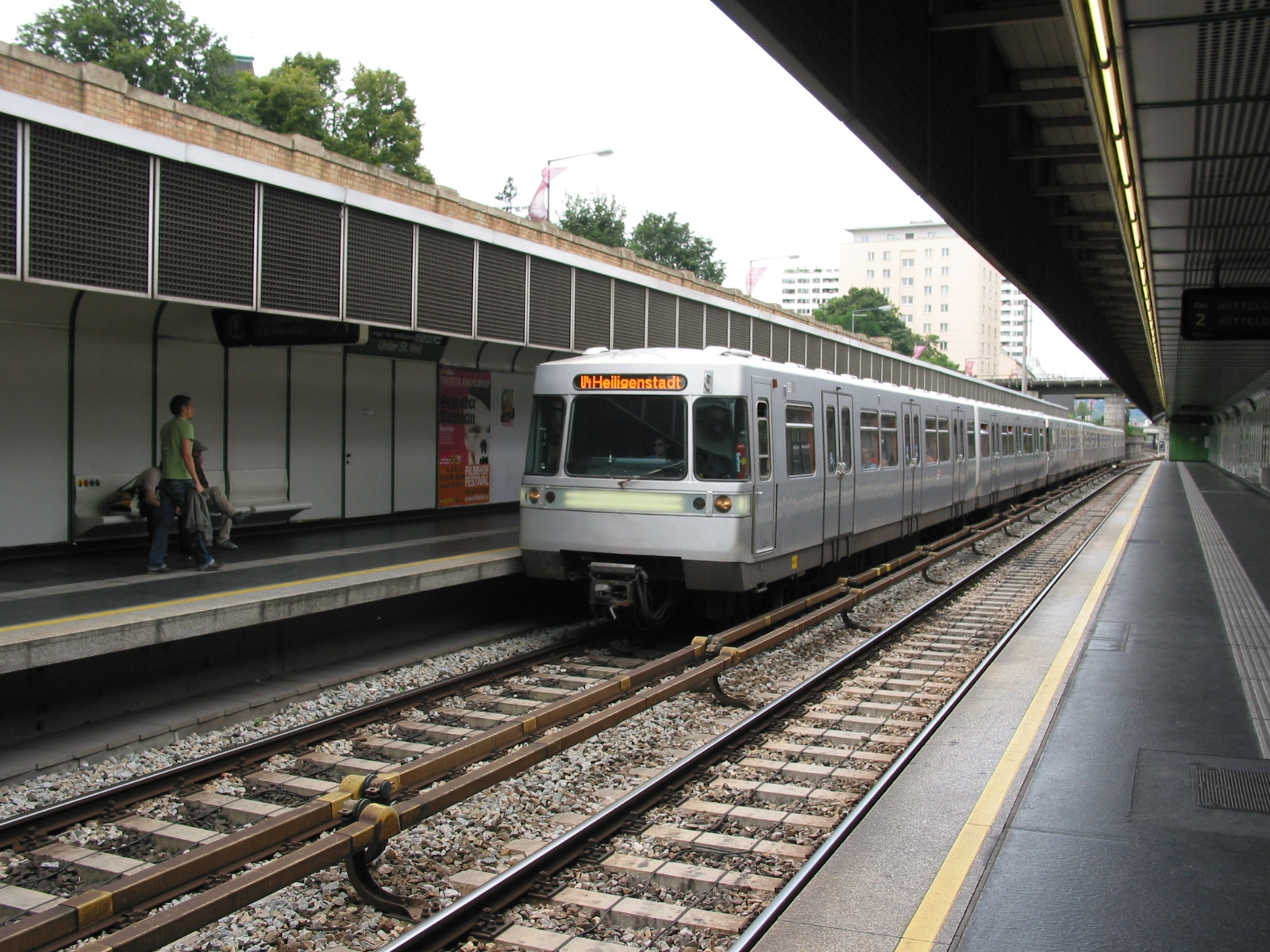

General information
- Location: Hietzing, Vienna; Austria
- Coordinates: 48.1911°N 16.2860°E

History
- Opened: 20 December 1981

Services
Preceding station	Wiener Linien	Following station
Ober St. Veit toward Hütteldorf	U4	Braunschweiggasse toward Heiligenstadt
Location

Unter St. Veit is a metro station on U4 of the Vienna U-Bahn. It is located in the Hietzing District. It opened in 1981.
