= James Clark Bunten =

James Clark Bunten may refer to:

- James Clark Bunten (engineer) (1838–1901), Scottish engineer who became chairman of the Caledonian Railway
- James Clark Bunten (sailor) (1875–1935), Scottish sailor who competed at the 1908 Summer Olympics
