= Wien (river) =

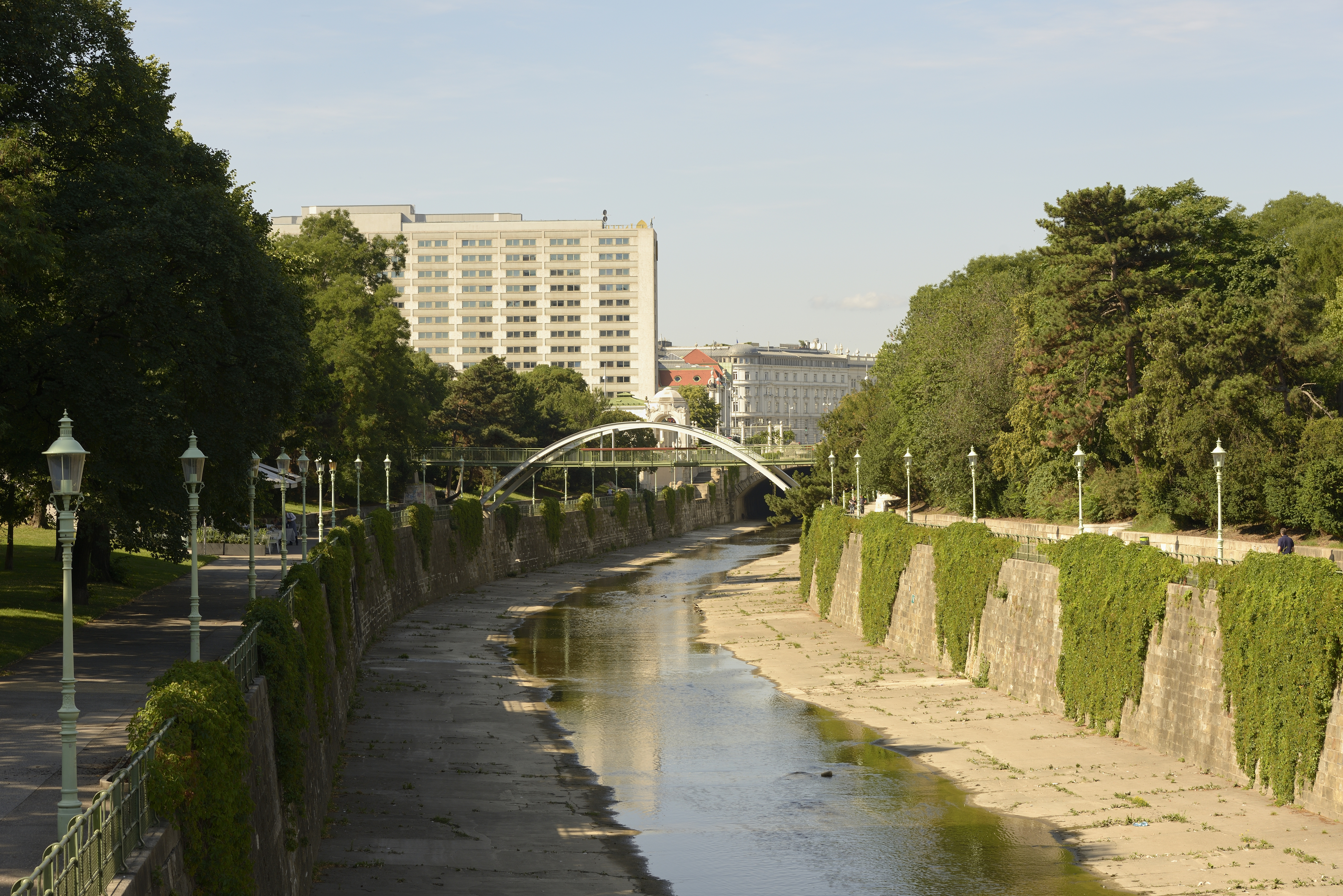
- The Wien in the Stadtpark

Location
- Country: Austria

Physical characteristics
- Source
  - location: Kaiserbrunnberg near Rekawinkel in Lower Austria
  - elevation: 520 m (1,710 ft)
- Mouth
  - location: Donaukanal (Danube) in Vienna
  - coordinates: 48°12′43″N 16°23′04″E
- Length: 34 km (21 mi)
- Basin size: 221 km^{2} (85 sq mi)

Basin features
- Progression: Danube→ Black Sea

The Wien is a river that flows through the capital of Austria, Vienna.

== Geography ==
The river Wien is 34 kilometres (21 mi) long, of which 15 km (9 mi) are within the city. Its drainage basin covers an area of 221 km^{2} (85 sq mi), both in the city and in the neighbouring Vienna Woods. Its source lies in the western Vienna Woods near Rekawinkel and its mouth at the eastern end of the city centre of Vienna, next to the Urania, where it flows into the Donaukanal ("Danube Canal"), a branch of the Danube.

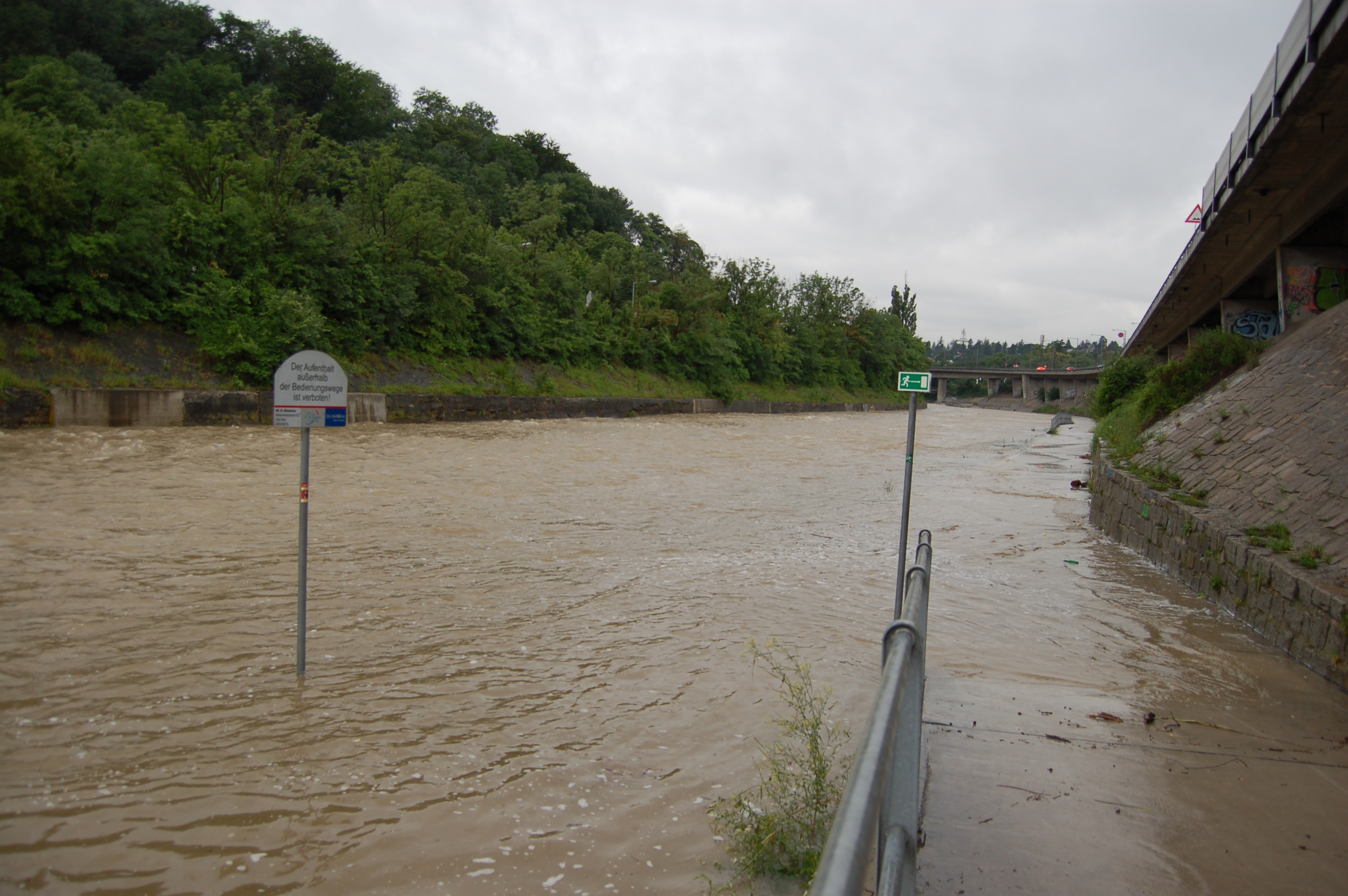
The Wien River in flood, near the Bräuhaus Bridge, June 2009

The Wien is subject to huge variations in flow. In its headwaters in the Vienna Woods, the soil is underlain by sandstone. Because of this, during heavy rain the soil quickly saturates, resulting in substantial runoff. Thus, the flow of the Wien can quickly increase from a creek-like 200 litres per second (7.1 cu ft/s) to 450,000 litres per second (16,000 cu ft/s) in the heaviest rains or during the spring snowmelt in the Vienna Woods, a ratio of over 1:2000.

== The Wien River and the city of Vienna ==
Within the city limits, the river bed consists almost entirely of concrete, which was installed between 1895 and 1899 in order to stop the devastating floods, sometimes accompanied by cholera, which the river had regularly caused before that time. At the same time, the Stadtbahn ("city railway") was built, which makes use of the concrete river bed and is separated from the river by only a wall. It is now part of the Vienna U-Bahn system.

Along the course of the river, the Naschmarkt and the Theater an der Wien can be found. Much of the river is covered over in the city, particularly in front of Schönbrunn Palace, in the Meidling and Naschmarkt neighbourhoods and around Karlsplatz near the city centre.

The River Gate was built in Jugendstil between the years 1903 to 1906 and was opened to the general public on 15 November 1906.

In April 2013, the City of Vienna approved plans to build three terraces along the river valley. Each terrace (or "zone") will cover a total area of 2,500 square metres (27,000 sq ft). The first terrace was expected to be completed by 2015.

=== Cycling and walking beside the Wien ===
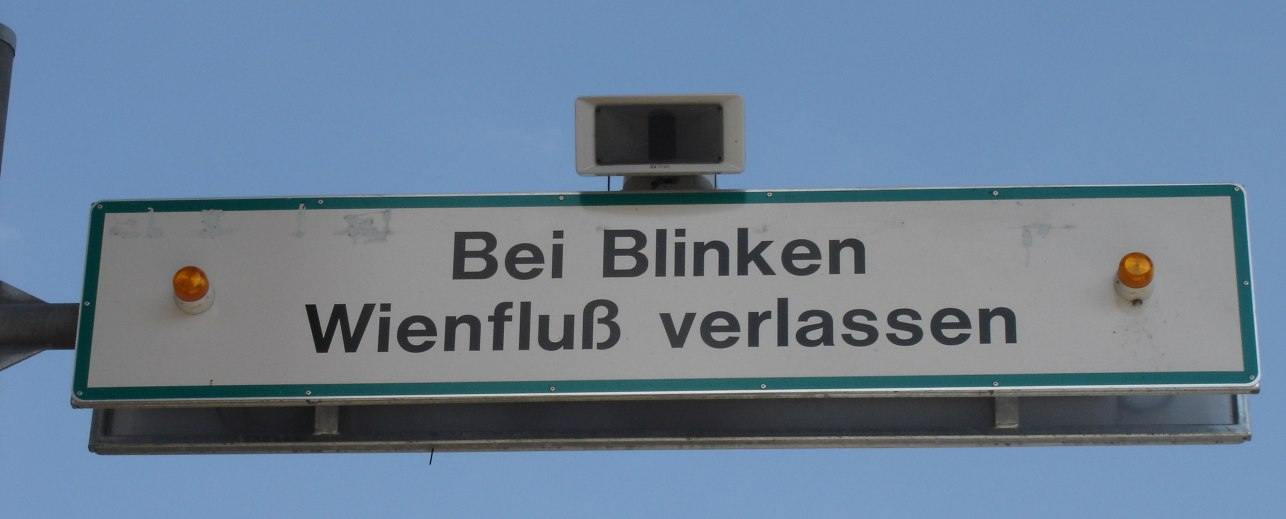
A sign with speaker used to warn cyclists and pedestrians; it says "Leave the river when (lights are) flashing."

For safety reasons, cycling or walking in the concrete bed of the Wien is officially prohibited. A continually controversial topic is whether to build cycle paths and footpaths next to the water. Proponents believe the water flow can be safely regulated, while opponents do not believe this is possible. In 2005, a short segment was opened to the public, near Hütteldorf railway station. It features an audible and visual alarm system to warn users to leave the path if flooding is imminent. Extensions to this path have been proposed, but continue to receive much opposition. The path is open from March to October.

== Nomenclature ==
In German, the river is colloquially called the "Wienfluss". Since English uses the name "Vienna" for what in German is called "Wien", in English the river is sometimes called the "Vienna River".

== Picture gallery ==
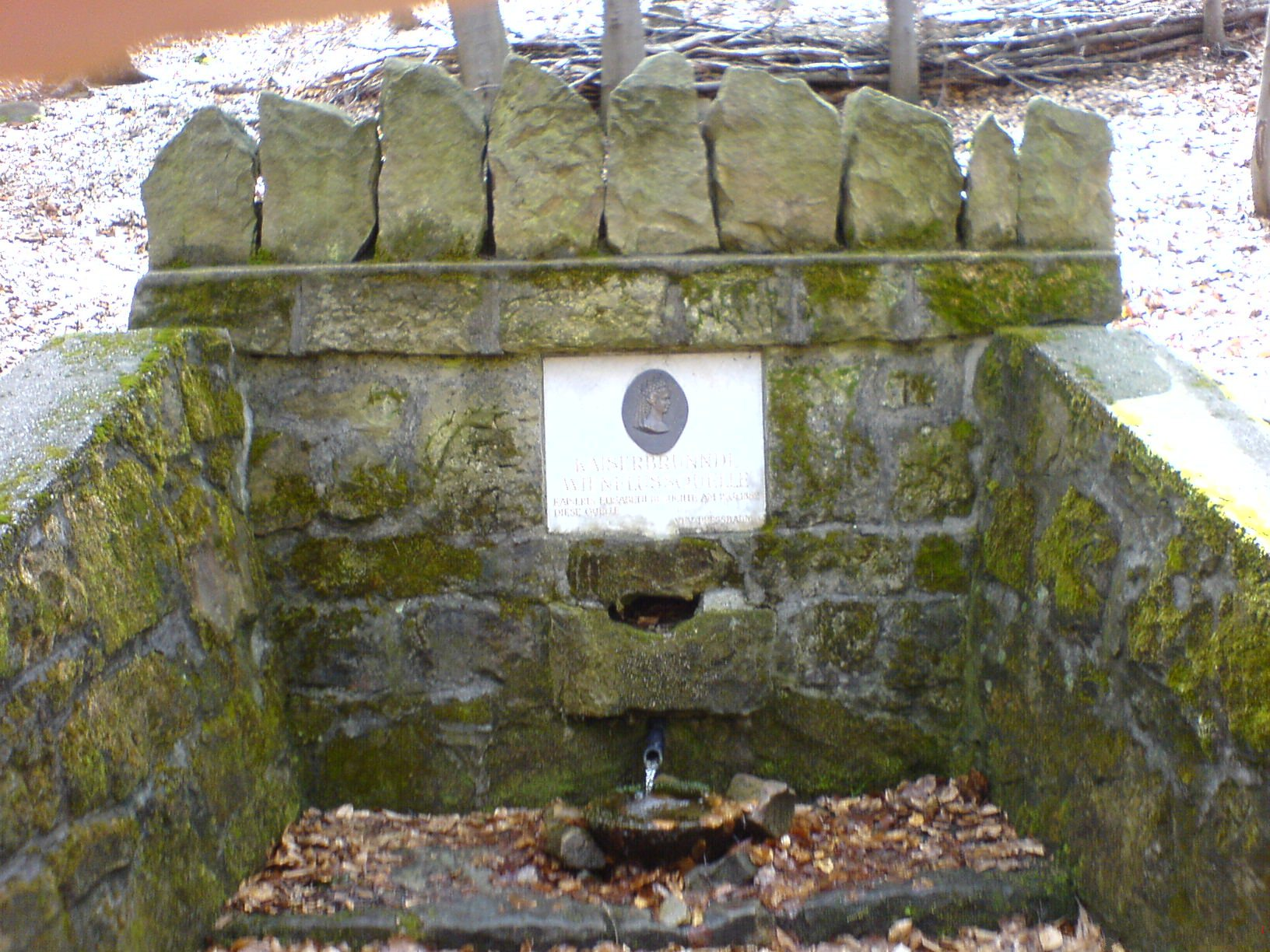
The source of the Wien River, the Kaiserbrünndl, located at Pfalzberg near Pressbaum

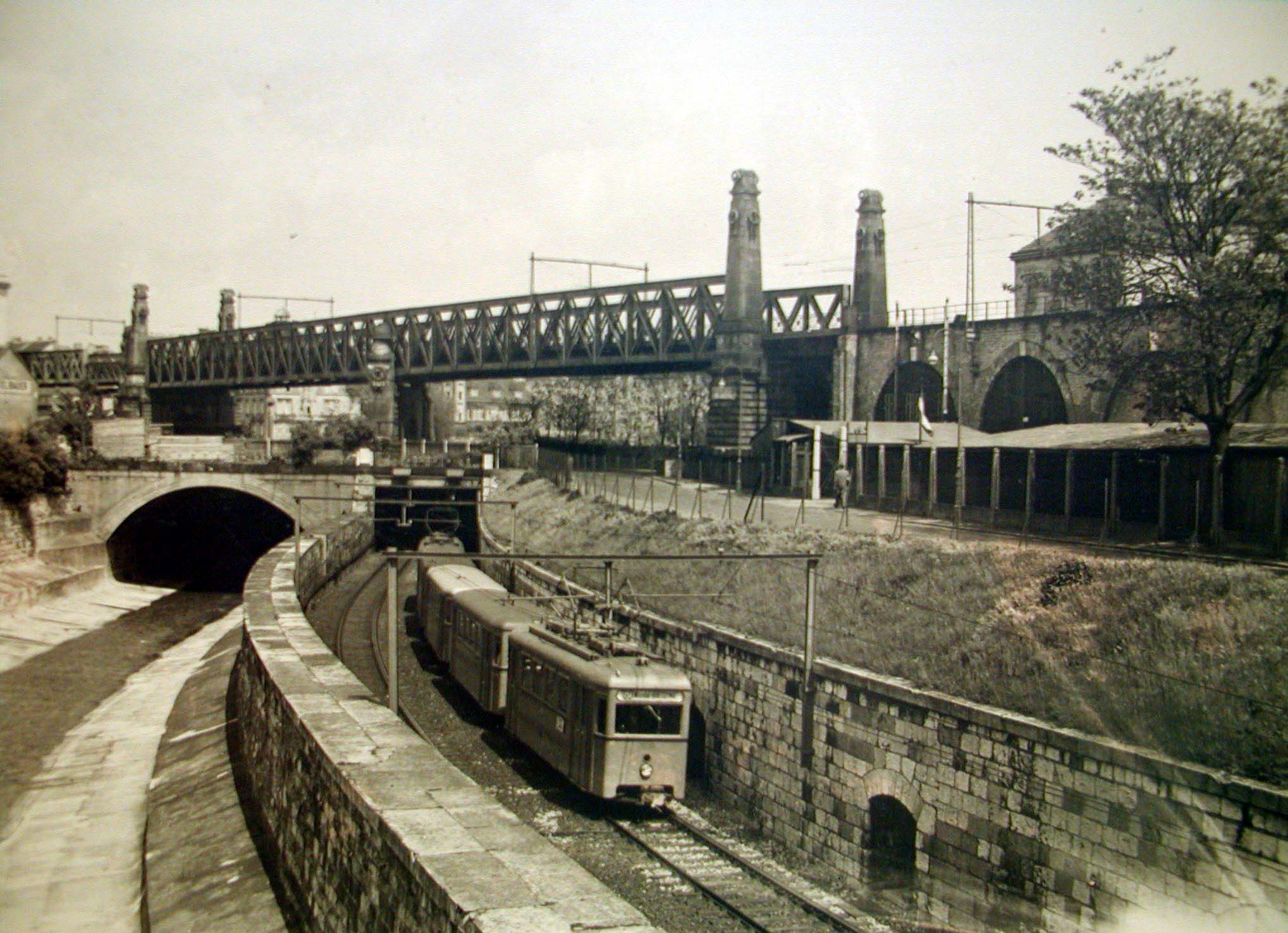
During the Stadtbahn era

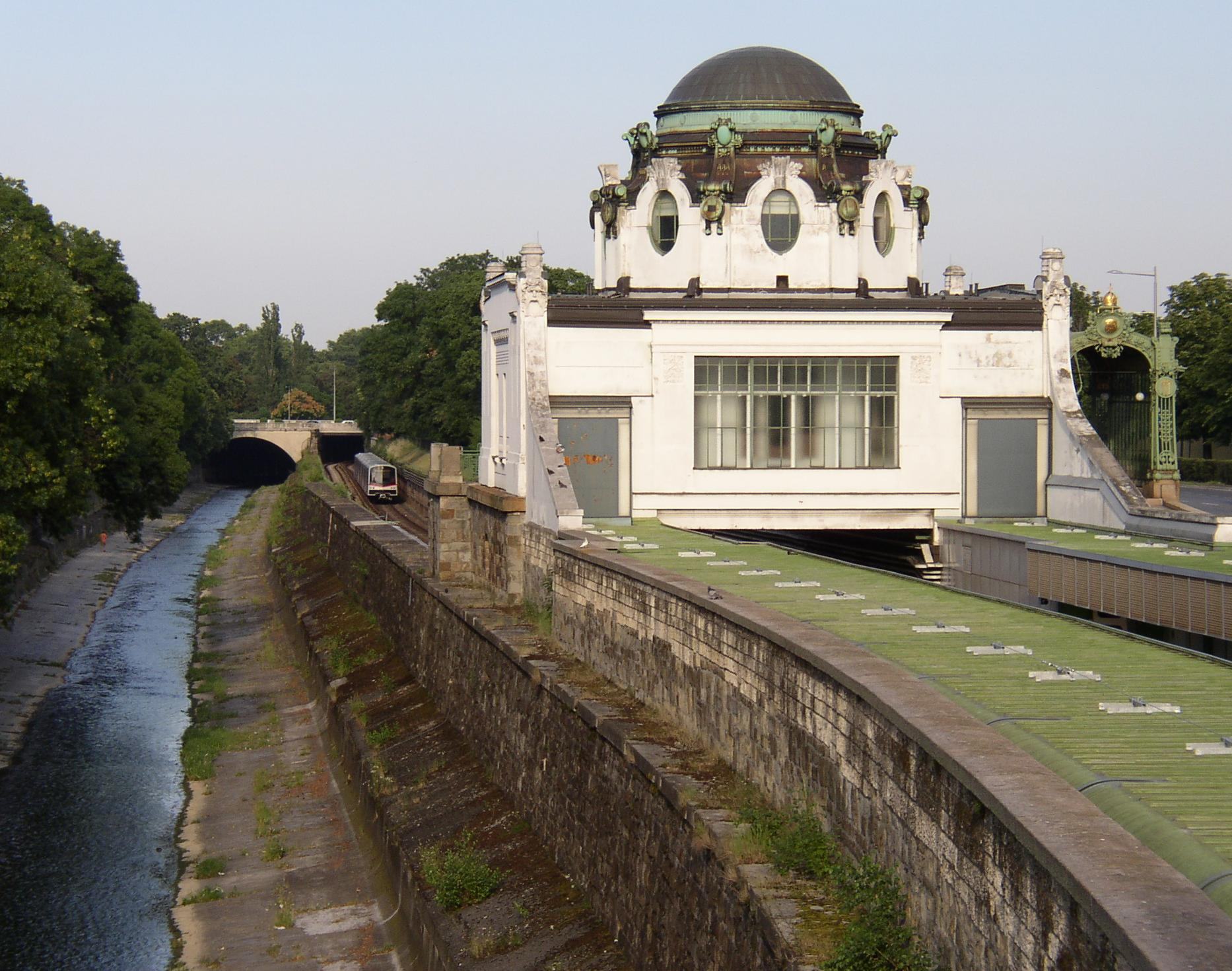
Underground line U4 and Hofpavillon by Otto Wagner

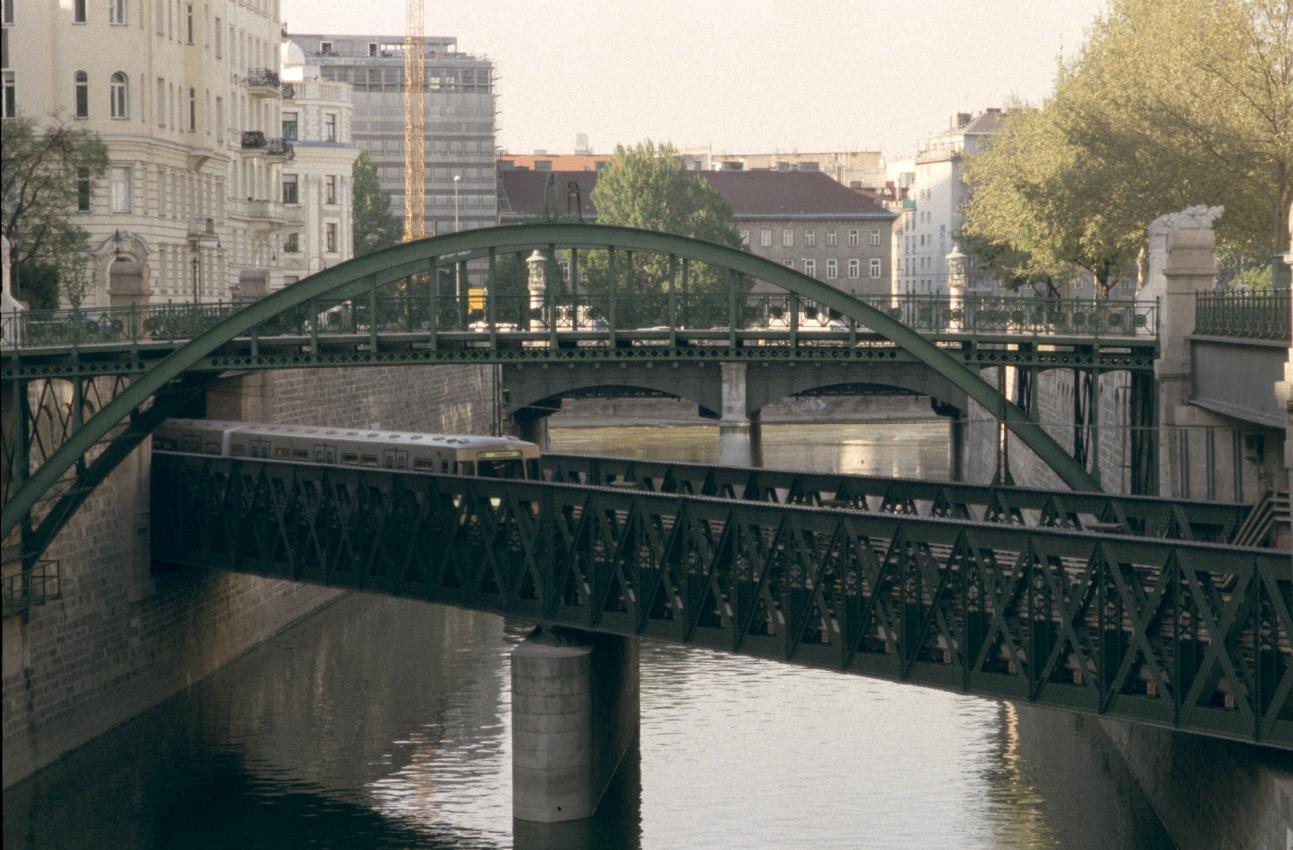
Bridges near the mouth: the upper one is a footbridge, while the lower one carries the Underground line U4

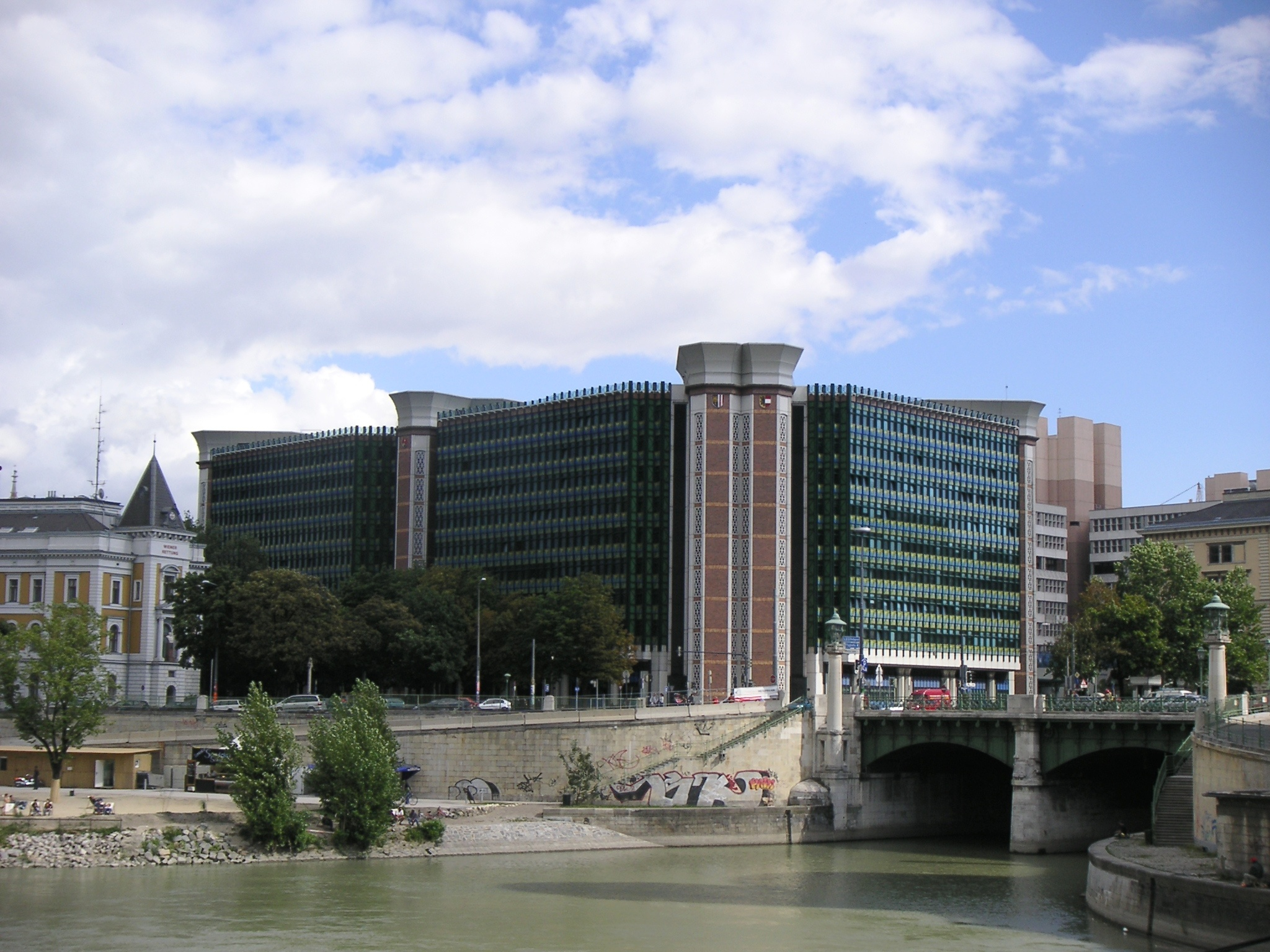
The mouth of the Wien River
