= Bunten =

Bunten may refer to:

== People ==
- Alice Chambers Bunten (1850–1940), Scottish lyricist for Salut d'Amour, composer, librettist, and biographer of Alice Barnham
- Bill Bunten (1930–2020), American politician from Kansas
- James Clark Bunten (engineer) (1838–1901), Scottish engineer who became chairman of the Caledonian Railway
- James Clark Bunten (sailor) (1875–1935), Scottish sailor who competed at the 1908 Summer Olympics

== Other ==
- Bunten, a name for the Japan Fine Arts Exhibition

== See also ==
- Danielle Bunten Berry, American game designer and programmer
