= Meidling Hauptstraße station =

Vienna U-Bahn station

Meidling Hauptstraße
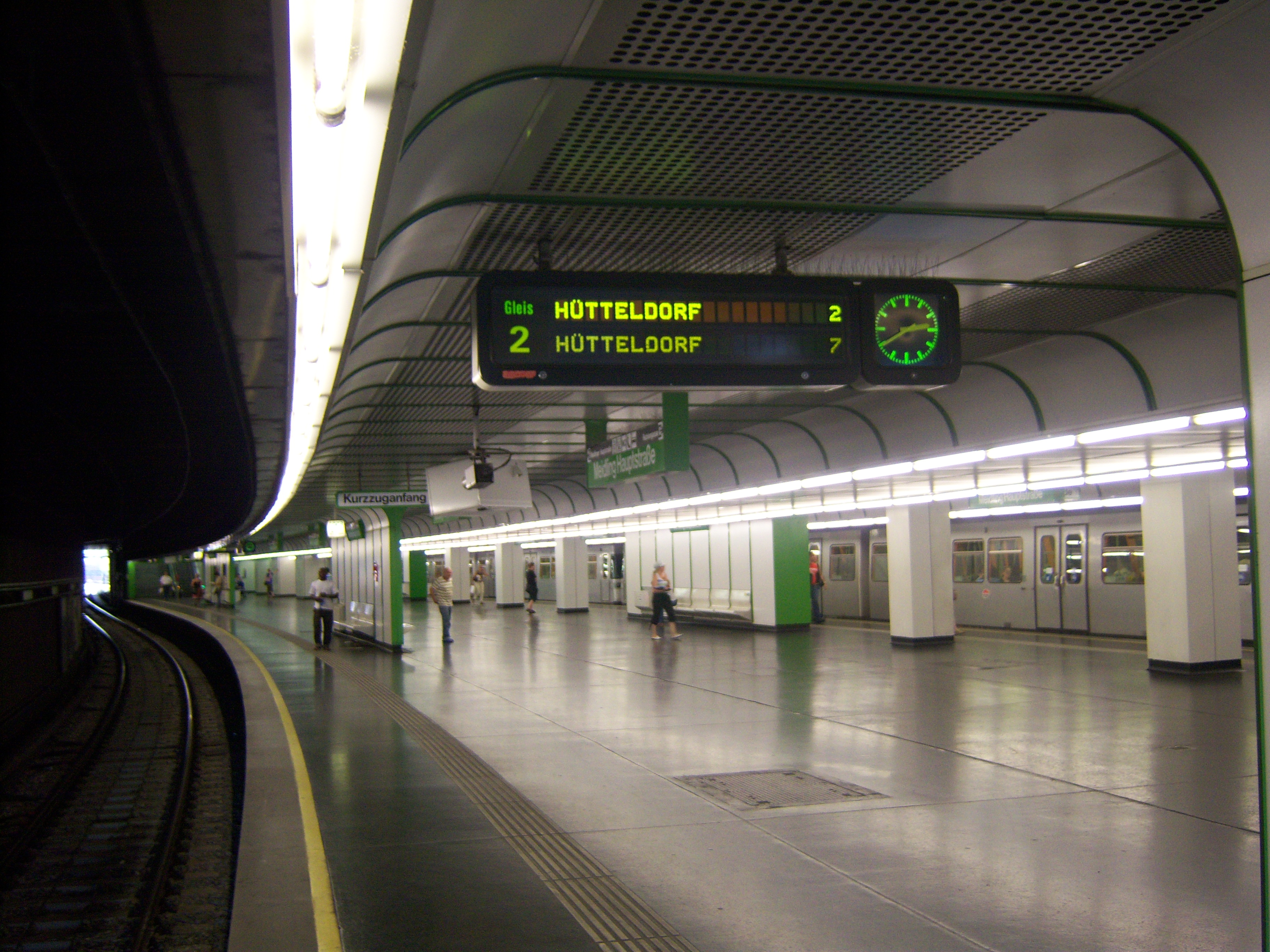

General information
- Location: Meidling, Vienna; Austria
- Coordinates: 48.1838°N 16.3290°E

History
- Opened: 1980

Services
Preceding station	Wiener Linien	Following station
Schönbrunn toward Hütteldorf	U4	Längenfeldgasse toward Heiligenstadt
Location

Meidling Hauptstraße is a station on U4 of the Vienna U-Bahn. It is located in the Meidling District. It opened in 1980.
