= U4 (Vienna U-Bahn) =

Metro line in Vienna

Line U4 U-Bahn-Linie U4
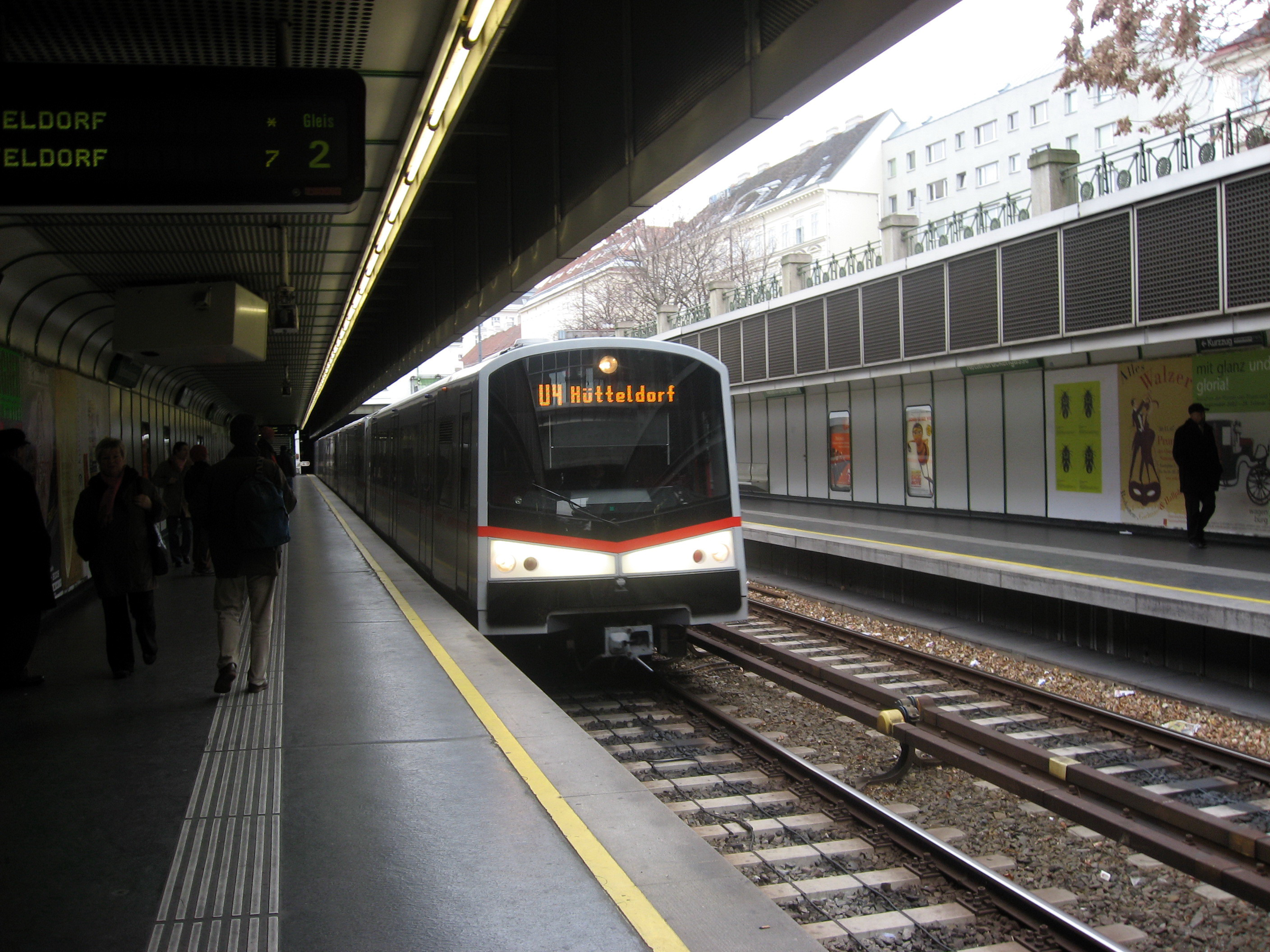
- Line U4 train at Kettenbrückengasse

Overview
- Status: Operational
- Termini: Hütteldorf; Heiligenstadt
- Stations: 20

Service
- Type: Rapid transit
- System: Vienna U-Bahn
- Operator(s): Wiener Linien
- Depot(s): Wasserleitungswiese, Hütteldorf

History
- Opened: 8 May 1976; 50 years ago
- Last extension: 1995

Technical
- Line length: 16.5 km (10.3 mi)
- Track gauge: 1,435 mm (4 ft 8 1/2 in) standard gauge
- Electrification: 750 V DC third rail

Line U4 is a line on the Vienna U-Bahn metro system. Opened in 1976, it currently has 20 stations and a total length of 16.5 km (10.3 mi), from Hütteldorf to Heiligenstadt. It is connected to U1 at Karlsplatz and Schwedenplatz, U2 at Karlsplatz and Schottenring, U3 at Landstraße, U6 at Längenfeldgasse and Spittelau.

== Stations ==
Line U4 currently serves the following stations:

- Hütteldorf (transfer to: - P+R park & ride facility)
- Ober St. Veit
- Unter St. Veit
- Braunschweiggasse
- Hietzing
- Schönbrunn
- Meidling Hauptstraße
- Längenfeldgasse (transfer to:)
- Margaretengürtel
- Pilgramgasse
- Kettenbrückengasse
- Karlsplatz (transfer to:)
- Stadtpark
- Landstraße (transfer to:)
- Schwedenplatz (transfer to:)
- Schottenring (transfer to:)
- Roßauer Lände
- Friedensbrücke
- Spittelau (transfer to: - P+R park & ride facility)
- Heiligenstadt (transfer to:)
