= Vienna Stadtbahn =

Public transportation system

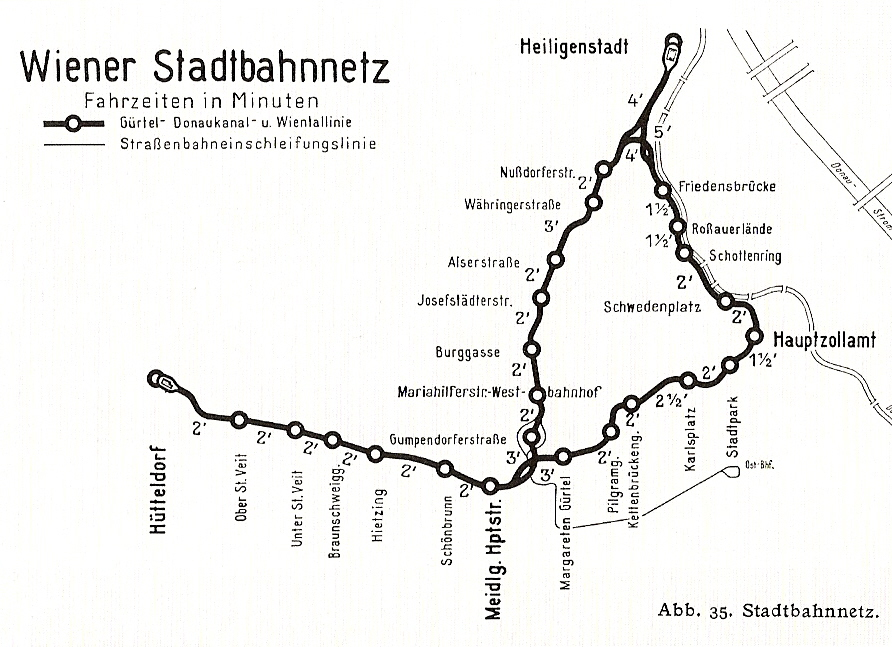
Vienna's Stadtbahn network in 1937

The Vienna Stadtbahn (German: Wiener Stadtbahn) was a rail-based public transportation system operated under this name from 1898 until 1989. Today, the Vienna U-Bahn lines U4 and U6 and the Vienna S-Bahn (commuter rail) run on its former lines.

In 1894, the architect Otto Wagner was hired as the artistic director for the Vienna Stadtbahn project. The Stadtbahn is one of Vienna's better-known examples of early Art Nouveau architecture. Its most famous buildings are the two former station entrances on Karlsplatz, now used as a café and a museum respectively, and the Hofpavillon, a station built specifically for Emperor Franz Joseph, located at the eastern end of Hietzing station. Other preserved historical stations are the elevated stations along the Gürtel and in some of the suburbs.

The use of the term Stadtbahn in the line's name derives from the 19th century usage of the term to simply mean a railway in an urban area, in a similar way to the naming of the roughly contemporaneous Berlin Stadtbahn. It is not related to the usage of the term stadtbahn in post-World War II Germany to mean light rail lines upgraded from street tramways. The use of tram type vehicles on much of the Vienna Stadtbahn after 1925 is entirely coincidental, and happened long after the line got its name.

== History ==
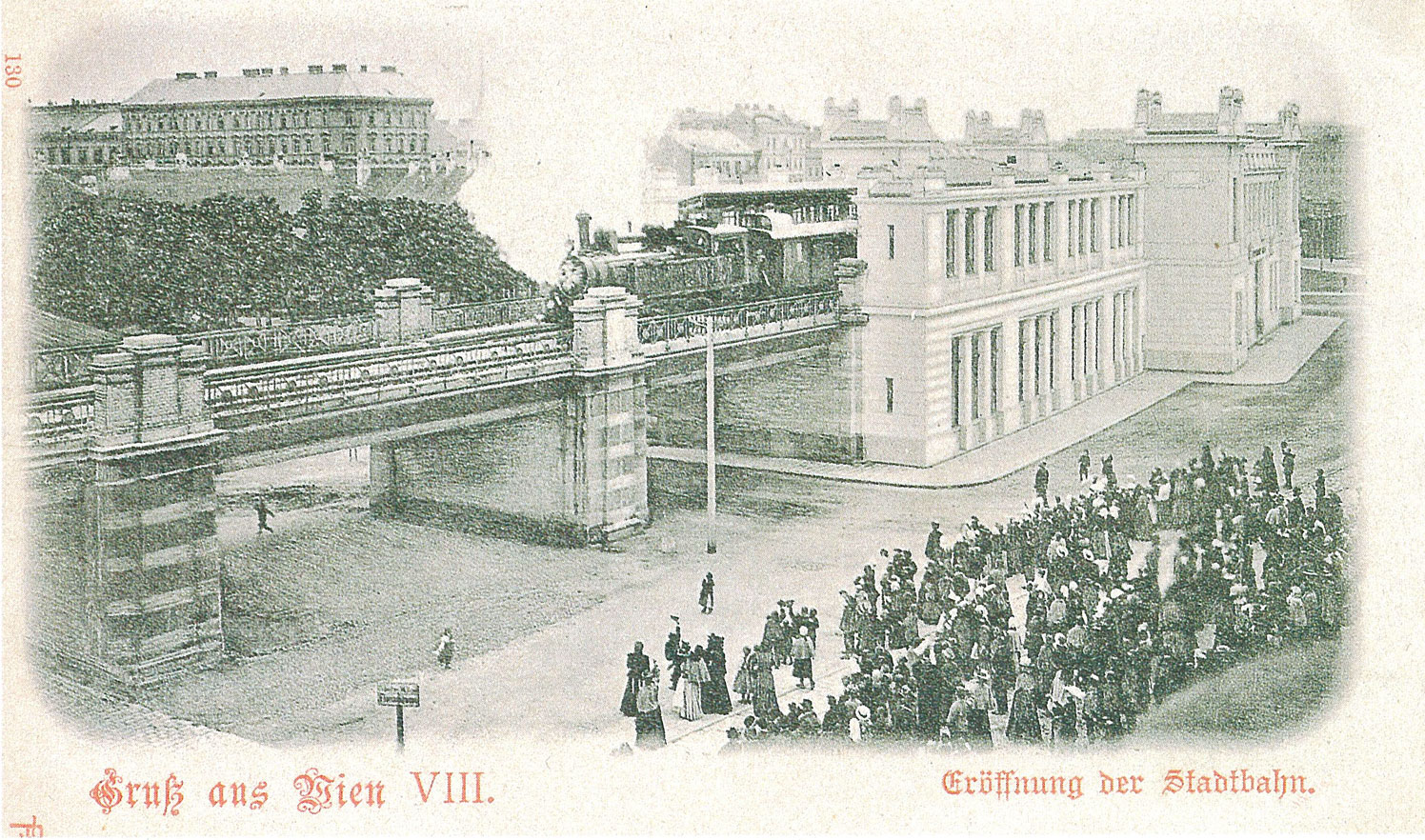
Opening of the Wiener Stadtbahn (postcard 1898)

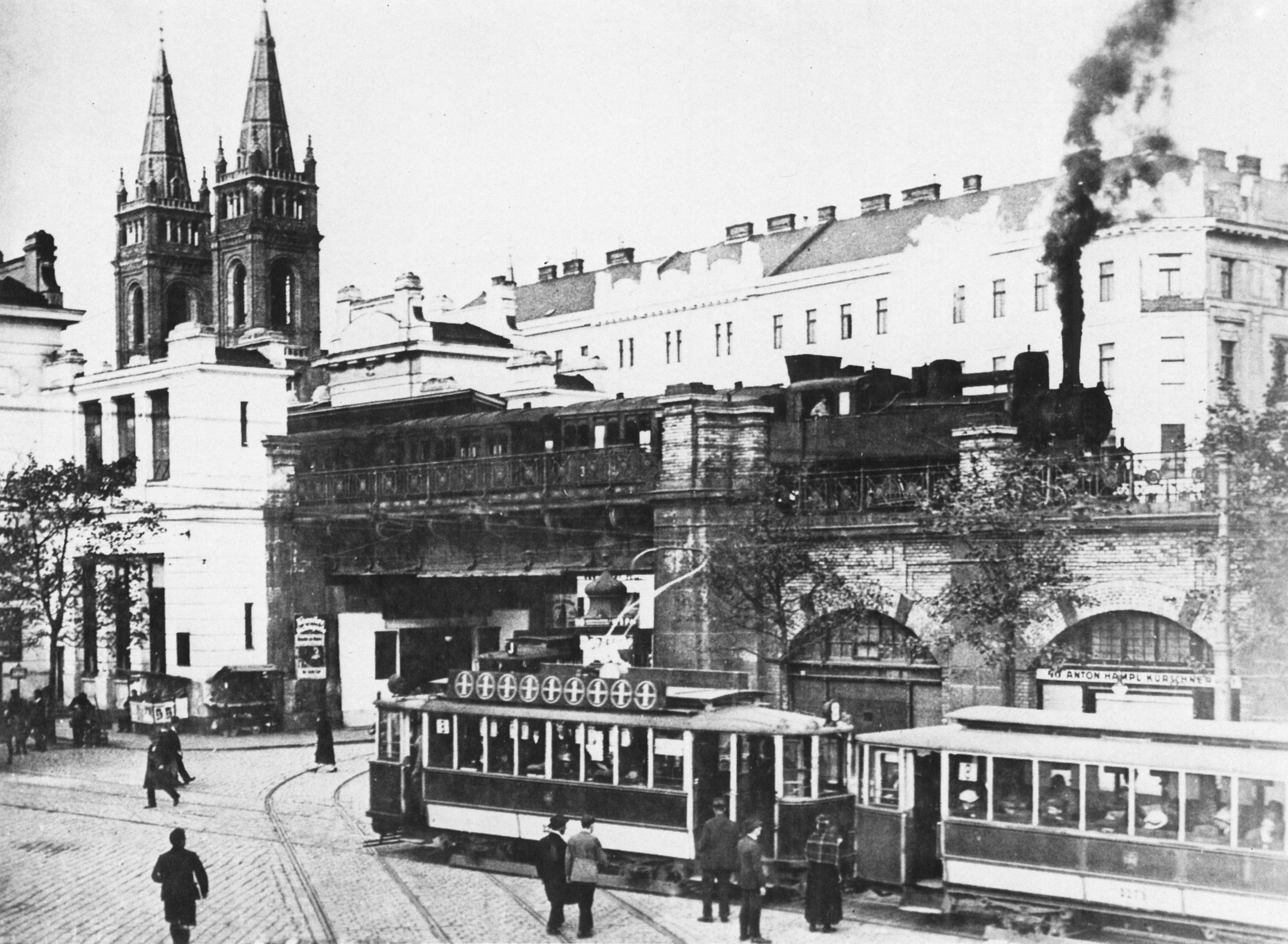
Before electric cars, ca. 1910

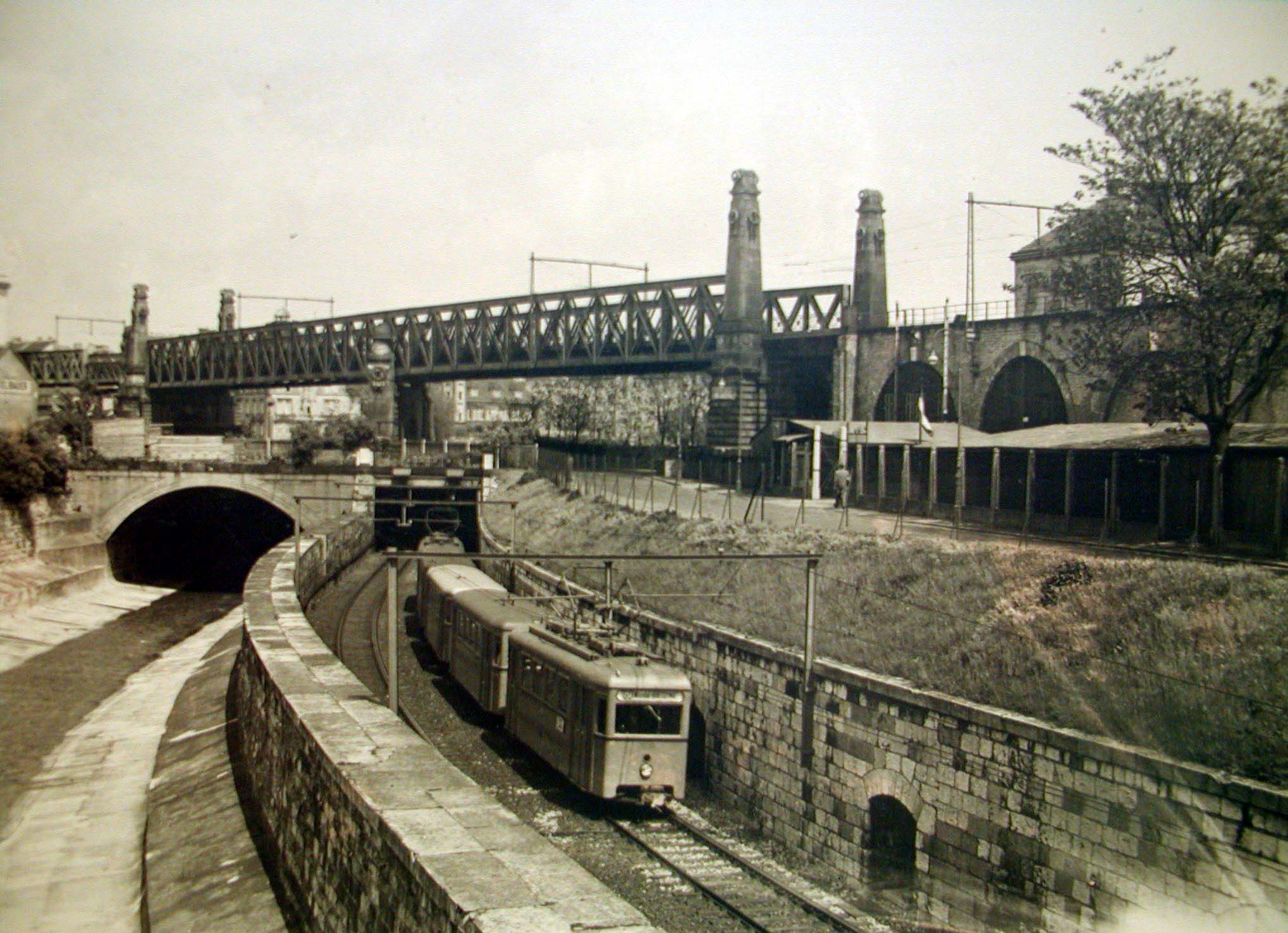
Wien River and Stadtbahn, on Längenfeldgasse (street)

=== Early plans ===
In Vienna, there were very early relevant projects for railway lines in the city. The oldest dates back to 1844, when the engineer Heinrich Sichrowsky designed an atmospheric railway based on system of George Medhurst and Samuel Clegg and emulating such lines in London and Paris. This new line was to lead from the Lobkowitzplatz below the Vienna Glacis to the Vienna River and to Hütteldorf. Finally, in 1849, Julius Pollack suggested that the Vienna Rail Link, which was still in the planning stage at the time, also be operated atmospherically.

The next plans followed in connection with the first city expansion in 1850, including one in 1852 preferred by the Vienna Construction Company and the Vienna Bank Corporation project. The second proposal, which had already been worked out in detail, was presented by Count Henckel von Donnersmarck in 1867. In 1869, Baurat Baron Carl von Schwarz finally brought in a third proposal. This was the first proposal to use the term Stadtbahn.

=== A need arises ===
By the latter half of the 19th century, there were seven main line railway lines radiating from Vienna. These were the Nordbahn opened in 1837, the Südbahn opened in 1841, the Ostbahn opened in the same year, the Westbahn opened in 1858, the Franz-Josefs-Bahn opened in 1870, the Nordwestbahn opened in 1872 and the Aspangbahn opened in 1881. Each of the seven routes belonged to a different railway company and each had its own train station in the capital, which were, partly for reasons of space, taxation and the military, built far from the city centre. Moreover, six of them were designed as terminal stations, and only the last-opened station, the Aspangbahnhof, was built as through station from the beginning. While the comparatively few passengers who did not have the capital as a starting point or destination were able to switch between the stations via the Vienna tramway, which was set up in 1865, this was much more difficult for transit freight traffic.

In addition, it became apparent in the late 19th century that the main stations themselves - including the Westbahnhof and Franz-Josefs-Bahnhof - urgently needed to be relieved. In the long run, they no longer met the complicated demands of parallel long-distance and local traffic and would have to be rebuilt without the construction of a metropolitan railway.

While the rival railway companies at that time had no interest in a central urban solution - the present-day Vienna Hauptbahnhof finally went into operation in 2012 - the Austrian military, after the March Revolution of 1848, demanded measures to prevent a recurrence of such events. Although the commissioning of the Verbindungsbahn from 1859, the Donauländebahn from 1872 and the Donauuferbahn from 1875 provided some relief, the heavy losses of the Battle of Königgrätz in 1866 showed that further connections between the long-distance railways were needed. After 1867, only 18 kilometers of the Austrian railway network - including the Verbindungsbahn - were in state hands, so in 1874 a renewed nationalization wave began. The de-privatization of operations combined with the new connections in the capital would make it possible, in case of mobilization - especially in case of a two-front war - to move troops, weapons and ammunition more easily. But also the so-called Approvisionierungsverkehr - that is, the supply of the city and the soldiers with food - played a major role in the future of the Vienna Stadtbahn. Equally important was the possibility to connect the large inner-city barracks to the main lines in the event of war, including, in particular between 1849 and 1856, the Arsenal, built as a consequence of the March Revolution.

Another important aspect of the construction of the Stadtbahn was the demolition of the Linienwalls, a fortification around the Vienna suburbs. It had become militarily obsolete in the middle of the 19th century, which initially led from 1873 to the building of the 75- to 80-meter wide Gürtelstraße, with the inner belt within the wall and the outer belt running outside the wall. The demolition of the fortifications from 1894 then made room for new urban railway lines. An early alternative term for the Stadtbahn was therefore 'Belt train' or 'Short Belt railway'.

At an early stage, it also became apparent that, for synergy reasons, it would make sense to link the Stadtbahn construction with two other major urban projects in the second half of the 19th century. One of these was the Vienna River canalisation, partly underground, and the other was the further extension of the Danube Canal. Both measures were mainly designed for flood protection, with the Danube Canal in the Freudenau also creating a trading and winter harbor, which was also flood-proof. In addition, the Danube Canal also received two collection channels, the left main collecting channel and the right main collecting channel, built in parallel with the Stadtbahn construction in the course of improving canalization in Vienna. The area gained by the straightening of the two rivers could thus be used for the urban railway lines, avoiding the expensive purchase of private land and the demolition of existing buildings.

=== 1873: The World's Fair ===
As a result of the 1873 Vienna World's Fair and the economic boom from 1871, the idea of a city railway was again on the agenda. As a result of a competition organized by the Ministry of Commerce, 23 new plans were received by 1 March 1873 [10]. Among them was, for the first time, a proposal for a pure tunnel railway, submitted by Emil Winkler. His planning was also based on the first systematic traffic census in Vienna. Even then, the ministry expressed the principle that level crossings with existing roads should not be allowed.

As a result of the economic collapse in Vienna in May 1873, interest in the so-called Stadtbahn question dropped again somewhat. Thus, none of the 23 drafts received a concession, although the municipality judged that of the consortium of Count Edmund Zichy, both in terms of the proposed local rail network and the proposed Vienna River canalisation as the most appropriate to the public interest. The project of Zichy and his fellow campaigners Baron Rothschild, Baron von Schey, Baron Carl von Schwarz, Achilles Melingo, Otto Wagner and Georg Scheyer provided an exclusively elevated train network with a central station between the Aspernbrücke and Augartenbrücke. From there, the line would lead in one direction to Baumgarten on the Westbahn, and in the other, along the Danube Canal to Franz-Josefs-Bahnhof and along the existing walls to the Rennweg. Further routes were planned to the Reichsbrücke, Hernals, Südbahnhof, Brigittenau or Floridsdorf.

=== Influence of Berlin ===
After almost ten years without progress, the German capital Berlin finally gave the immediate impetus for a renewed discussion of the Viennese city rail question. [11] As early as 7 February 1882, the Berliner Stadtbahn service began operations, which later served as a model for the Viennese Stadtbahn in several respects. Not only did it use continuous viaducts to carry the railway above the city's streets, but it was also operated by the state railway with steam locomotives and short train sets, and it joined several previously existing terminal stations with each other. In this context, three new proposals were submitted to the Austrian Government, the first even in the year before the opening of the Berlin plant.

The first proposal was submitted in August 1881 by a consortium of British engineers including James Clark Bunten and Joseph Fogerty, which reached the stage of obtaining a concession on 25 January 1883. It included a central station on the Danube Canal as well as a two-track belt railway with branches to all Viennese stations and to Hietzing. The route of the approximately 13 kilometres (8.1 mi) long ring was planned along the Danube Canal and Wien River as an elevated railway on iron viaducts, and on the Gurtel partly as a viaduct and partly as an open or covered trench. The branch lines would all be built as elevated railways, mostly on viaducts. However the concession was extinguished by the Austrian government on 14 March 1886 because financial proof of the estimated cost of 719 million Austrian crowns could not be provided.

In competition with the Bunten and Fogerty proposal was a project submitted in 1883 by the Wiener Stadtbauamt for the construction of a line that consisted of the following three main lines:

- a double-track belt line from the Südbahnhof to the connection to the Nordbahn and the Nordwestbahn, for the most part intended as an elevated railway
- a central four-track underground line, crossing the diameter of the inner city in a north-south direction
- a line to be built as an elevated railway from the Westbahnhof to the former Schickaneder Bridge at today's Getreidemarkt

In addition, Siemens & Halske submitted the project of a network of electric railways for Vienna in 1884. However, the latter was narrow gauge and was therefore not accepted because the competent authorities feared that this could prevent the emergence of other lines.

=== Planning ===
For the first time, the Stadtbahn project was made concrete in 1890, when Krauss & Co. submitted drafts as a basis for the official negotiations, although they have undergone numerous changes during the following years. The reason for the renewed approach to Stadtbahn construction was on the one hand the continuing economic upturn in Austria, and on the other hand a major expansion of the city of Vienna, adding districts 11 to 19 to the existing districts 1 to 10. As a result, the city increased from 55 to 179 square kilometers and the population increased from 800,000 to 1,300,000, causing the Stadtbahn project to gain in urgency. At the same time, the western expansion of the city required the expansion of the Stadtbahn project to take into account the newly incorporated municipalities from the beginning. So the planners added the so-called suburb line to the project, even though the namesake suburbs now also all belonged directly to the city.

Finally, in the later Railway Ministry, held from 5 October to 16 November 1891 an enquete. It turned out that the decision to build would only be made jointly by the state, the state and the municipality. The Ministry therefore proposed the creation of a joint commission.

In agreement with the Province of Lower Austria and the City of Vienna, the Government of Prime Minister Eduard Taaffe therefore presented to the Imperial Council on 6 February 1892 a comprehensive bill on the execution of the traffic facilities in Vienna, in which the urban railway lines were fixed. These assumed both houses of the Reichsrat and announced it as law of 18 July 1892. [14] [15] The merit of this is due first and foremost Heinrich Ritter von Wittek, 1897-1905 k.k. Railway Minister.

=== Commission für Verkehrsanlagen (1892) ===
On 25 July 1892 constituted, as proposed by the Ministry of Railways in the previous year, the so-called commission for traffic in Vienna. In it, the imperial-royal government, represented by the Ministry of Commerce, the Municipality of Vienna, the Crown Land of Lower Austria and the Vienna Danube Regulatory Commission were equally represented, with only unanimous decisions were provided. Specifically, the new committee had the task of coordinating the following three planning authorities:

- Tracing Bureau of the k.k. General Inspection of the Austrian Railways, responsible for the Stadtbahn
- City Construction Office of the Municipality of Vienna, responsible for the regulation of Vienna River
- Danube regulation commission, responsible for the construction of the Danube Canal, including collecting channel production

Consequently, the Commission was not only responsible for Stadtbahn construction, but also acted as the builder for the two parallel river settlement projects, most of which were to be paid by the municipality of Vienna. On 27 October 1892 the ministerial decision was made, whereby the route of all lines was approved. As a result, the Commission decided on 28 November 1892 to begin the Stadtbahn with the suburban line in Heiligenstadt. On 18 December 1892, she finally received the official concession for the operation of the Stadtbahn. The construction itself, on the other hand, was transferred to the State Railways.

=== Construction begins ===
Ultimately, the suburban line, which has in places the character of a mountain railway, the most difficult section and was therefore set back a little. In the incisions there, the fine sands turned into the Tegel proved to be floating sands, and even in the case of the Great Turkish Schanzen Tunnel the mountain pressure caused great difficulties in advancing in the insufficiently drained Sarmatian sands. Thus, the breakdown of the tunnel was delayed until the summer of 1895. For the suburb line was already on 1 August 1892 k.k. Chief engineer Albert Gatnar has been appointed as site manager, while for the waist line k.k. Chief Architect Anton Millemoth and for the Wientallinie and the Danube Canal Line k.k. Oberbaurat Professor Arthur Oelwein were responsible. Thus began the Stadtbahn construction work on 16 February 1893 with the waist line in Michelbeuern. Previously, however, was begun on 7 November 1892 by a groundbreaking ceremony with the removal of the water reservoir of the former Kaiser-Ferdinand water pipe in front of the Western Railway. Thus, this day can already be regarded as the start of construction.

The construction of the suburban line finally began in December 1893, when the substructure work for the section Heiligenstadt-Gersthof was commissioned and started in the same month. By the end of 1894, the sections Heiligenstadt-Westbahnhof, Heiligenstadt-Hernals and Hütteldorf-Hacking-Hietzing were under construction. 1895 followed the upper Wientallinie, 1896 finally also the lower Wientallinie. The last step was the construction of the Danube Canal Line on 13 January 1898, whereby no separate date has been handed down for the connecting sheet - which was erected along with it.

In advance, the commission had to acquire numerous plots of land ranging in size from a minimum of eight square meters to a maximum of 35,700 square meters. Depending on the situation, the compensation varied between two and a half and 153 Austrian guilders per square meter. In 436 cases succeeded in an amicable agreement with the previous owners, only in 22 other cases had to be forcibly appropriated by court decision. However, the value of the houses and land along the train by their construction increased significantly, that is, the Stadtbahn - which caused this increase in value - had to pay in the redemption itself, the higher prices. Even individual buildings had to give way to the Stadtbahn. Among them, for example, in 1893 one of the line chapels on the belt, the so-called bridge chapel. Alternatively, Otto Wagner built in the immediate vicinity of the old site from 1895, the St. John Nepomuk Chapel, it was consecrated in 1897. In general, the Stadtbahn took considerable influence on the streets and squares in their neighborhood as well as the economic conditions of the affected districts. Thus, for example, the already existing Gürtelstraße was freed from the many salient old buildings and erected on their mirror grounds, where previously stored behind wooden crates and dilapidated fences, construction materials, stones, scrap iron and the like, the city railway arches. The remaining part of the belt mirror was then transformed into gardens.

The new inner-city transport network of the capital was considered a state-owned prestige object of Cisleithania, which is why the state guaranteed all necessary funds and thus made a speedy realization possible. In addition, cheap workers from all over the monarchy were available; At times, up to 100,000 people were at the same time in use. Among them were mainly Czechs, Slovaks, Italians, Slovenians, Lower Austrians and Styrians, to a lesser extent workers from other parts of Austria-Hungary and even from abroad, including from France and Greece.

=== The local railways are rescheduled to main railways, the inner ring line is omitted (1894) ===
The steam tramway company formerly Krauss & Comp applied for the concession of the three sections of the first construction section to be operated as local railways. She hoped thereby a link with the already operated by her routes to Mödling in the south and Stammersdorf in the north, but could not prove the necessary funds. As early as 16 January 1894, therefore, decided all three curia of the Commission for traffic systems unanimously, even run the local rail lines themselves. Thereupon the state railway received finally by highest decision of 3 August 1894 also the concession for the Wientallinie and the Donaukanallinie transferred.

The two routes then had to be re-planned and ultimately went into operation as main railways. In return, the steam tramway company suffered through the rescheduling a disadvantage. Because in order to clear the construction field for the Stadtbahn, they had to shut down their - only on 22 December 1886 opened - 3 December 1886 - 3.21 km long section Hietzing-Schönbrunner line and also build a new terminus in Hietzing. Furthermore, in 1894, the Hütteldorf-Hacking-Hietzing section, which was not originally planned in the first construction phase, was preferred in 1894 in order to link the Wientallinie with the Westbahn. This in turn was the Nebenast Westbahnhof-Penzing the belt line obsolete and disappeared from the planning. However, because the suburban line should nevertheless receive a connection in the direction of Innere Stadt, a second pair of tracks had to be laid between Penzing and Hütteldorf-Hacking parallel to the existing Westbahn for the Stadtbahn. Thus, the station Hütteldorf-Hacking took over - actually intended for the station Penzing - node function in the western city. Also in 1894 newly included in the planning was a connecting curve between the stations Gumpendorfer road and Meidling main road. It should allow, despite the canceled track triangle at the Westbahnhof, direct train services between the belt line and the Westbahn.

The third local railway of the first construction phase, the inner ring line, was completely discarded in 1894. Although it should continue to be reserved for a private railway, the concession should be granted only if the route could be carried out with electrical operation. Ultimately, this compound, with some similar route, only in 1966 initially as Unterpflasterstraßenbahn in the course of the so-called two-line, which eventually mutated in 1980 to the U2.

=== Financial reasons in 1895-1896 ===
The reorganization of the Wientallinie and the Donaukanal line from subordinate local railways to fully developed main railways complicated and made the project considerably more expensive. Due to the architectural quality demanded by Otto Wagner, the buildings of the more important routes were much more expensive than planned before 1894. [25] Thus moved the second phase of construction in the distance. In addition, on 11 July 1895, the Commission decided to postpone the Donaustadt line, which was still allocated to the first phase of construction, and for which to date 264,915 Austrian crowns have been incurred for preparatory work, projection costs and land acquisition. This meant that the four intermediate stations planned on this route, Kronprinz-Rudolfs-Brücke, Gaswerk, Lederfabrik and Donau-Kaltbad were obsolete.

Another concretization of the plans was made by the law of 23 May 1896. In addition, in August 1896 a k.k. Baudirection for the Wiener Stadtbahn as a separate department in the Ministry of Railways was called into being and Friedrich Bischoff von Klammstein appointed as Baudirektor or section chief, she replaced the then disbanded Directorate General of k.k. State Railways. From Klammstein were under three construction management, that is, the suburb line, the belt line and the Wientallinie each formed a lot. The various construction managements together employed about 70 civil servants, including 50 technicians. As lecturers for substructure, superstructure, building construction and material management of this building management k.k. Bauräthe Hugo Koestler, Christian Lang, Joseph Zuffer and Alexander Linnemann. The Department of Basic Redemption led the k.k. Hofrath dr. Victor Edler von Pflügl. The administrative business of the Commission for Traffic Systems was initially headed by the Lieutenant Baron von Hock, later the Lieutenant Governor Lobmeyr. As a technical advisor Ministerialrat Doppler acted.

Also in 1896, the project operators also reduced the planning for the construction of the belt line. It was supposed to lead from the Gumpendorfer Straße station - the wall approaches erected as a preliminary construction work are still visible there today - over the unrealized station Arbeitergasse in the Gaudenzdorfer Gürtel / Margaretengürtel area to the Matzleinsdorf freight station of the Südbahn. From there, a continuation over the Laaer Berg to the eastern railway might have been considered. As a problem here proved the not yet nationalized Südbahn-Gesellschaft, whose infrastructure should use the Stadtbahn in the so-called Péage traffic. That's why it was decided at that time:

"The construction of the Gumpendorferstraße-Matzleinsdorf line of the belt line will only be carried out if the relations between the Southern Railway and the State Railways are finally settled."

However, the saved connection between Gumpendorfer Straße and Matzleinsdorf threatened to have a negative impact on the future operation, because the belt line from the main customs office station would not have been possible without a change of direction. To compensate for this deficiency, the responsible persons therefore integrated in 1896 at short notice still a connecting curve between the stations Brigittabrücke on the Danube Canal Line and Nußdorfer Street on the belt line in the planning. This short crossbar was henceforth usually referred to as a connecting curve or connecting arch, but in some sources is not considered as an independent route, but only as part of the Danube Canal Line.

Another saving measure concerned the viaduct arches. In this case, the plaster façade originally planned by Otto Wagner was dropped. Instead, the - originally light yellow - clinker bricks and the cornices made of solid natural stone masonry are now visible, as was the case previously with the Verbindungsbahn and the Berliner Stadtbahn. Visually, the vaults stood in stark contrast to the white plastered station buildings, except in the Stadtbahn, the architect has planned or executed no further brick facades.

=== Construction problems in 1897 ===
While the construction of the suburban line, the upper Wientallinie and the waistline brought only minor difficulties, the lower Wientallinie prepared due to complications in connection with the regulation and partial doming of the Wienflusses much larger problems. So the river often had to be completely relocated to make room for both objects. In some places entire groups of houses were demolished. The construction was the most difficult at those points where the foundations of the city railway walls often reached six to seven meters below the foundations of the old neighboring houses. In addition, the flood events that occurred at that time caused widespread destruction of the buildings in the critical state of foundation and led to construction interruptions. In particular, this was true for the so-called century flood in July 1897.

The second major difficulty in the construction of the Wientallinie represented the elaborate reconstruction of the station Hauptzollamt, which alone cost over eight million Austrian crowns. This was done while maintaining the rail traffic to the Vienna Main Customs Office and the wholesale market hall and was associated with time-consuming provisional. The station was originally in high altitude and had to be lowered by 6.82 meters for the Stadtbahn, because both adjacent new lines were Tiefbahnen. This project was made even more difficult by the existing connection to the Praterstern, which in turn remained an elevated railway.

The lowering of the station main customs office took place with simultaneous increase of four busy roads with altogether approx. 20,000 daily wagons, in particular the Ungargasse, the Landstraßer main road, the Marxergasse and the rear Zollamtsstraße. They crossed under the connecting track before by means of long, hose-like underpasses with only very small passage heights of 3,6, 4,0 and 4,45 meters. For this purpose, a provisional station supported by 3,000 pilots had to be built first. Only then could the demolition of the old station begin, which in turn was connected to a movement of 380,000 cubic meters of earth and stone material, and the new construction of the final station. The transfer of the four above-mentioned streets required the construction of iron bridges in the width of 54.8, 70.2, 92.6 and 63.6 meters, also had existing water pipes and gas pipes with a total length of 2520 meters, various cables with a total length of 3520 meters, 260 meters pipe post pipes and the local main sewer are laid. The outflow of the Wiener Neustädter Canal was accomplished by the installation of a siphon.

Furthermore, because the main customs office should not lose its siding, there also had to be constructed an electrically operated lift for freight wagons weighing up to 30 tons, with a lifting height of six meters. The wholesale market hall, in turn, received a new siding in a low-lying position, but in order to use it, electric elevators had to be installed in the building.

=== Short-term rescheduling of the Danube Canal Line and the Connecting Arc (1898) ===
Due to local resident protests in the IX. District had to be rescheduled in the course of 1898, and thus in a very late project phase, even the originally intended as elevated rail section Schottenring-Brigittabrücke in a more expensive low-gauge line. However, the associated additional costs of 4.6 million Austrian crowns were borne by the municipality of Vienna by municipal decree of 1 June 1898. By this measure, the opening of the Danube channel line was obsolete before the turn of the century, because the section in question could only in the fall of 1898 tackled while the rest of the Danube Canal Line has been under construction since the beginning of the year.

The lowering of the route was also structurally challenging. The reason for this were the foundations of the town-side retaining walls at Morzinplatz and the translation of the Alsbach river. At the Morzinplatz, the workers on the surface initially encountered the old fortification walls, which made it more difficult for the local floating sand to carry out the construction work. Another problem was the recently built right main collecting channel. It was close to the track, but in a higher position than the track, so that its existence would have been endangered at the lowest setting. As a result, neither water could be pumped out of the foundations' pits during the construction of the railway supporting wall, which was to be laid five to six meters below the ground, nor could it be piloted - also because of the vibration. Therefore, cast iron fountain wreaths with a diameter of two meters were sunk, concreted and placed on these walls.

The extension of the gallery route along the Danube Canal also affected the connecting arch, which was originally only 850 meters long. Due to the lowering of his starting point, he could no longer take Brigittabrücke to the station Nußdorfer Straße, i.e. in place of today's Nordbergbrücke, because otherwise the slope of the ramp to the bridge over the Franz-Josefs-Bahn would have been too strong. Instead, the planners artificially prolonged it to a north-sweeping turn to achieve a more favorable pitch ratio. Thus, however, the already built branch at the station Nußdorfer road was useless, this construction advance in the area of the arcs with the numbers 179-184 remained until today. As a substitute the roundabout Nußdorfer Straße was built about 300 meters further in the direction of Heiligenstadt.

=== Postponement of the opening date ===
Originally, all routes of the first phase were to go into operation together at the end of 1897. Due to the varying degrees of delays, the client finally waived the simultaneous opening of the entire network. As an alternative, the following completion plan was in effect at the beginning of 1898:

- Suburban line until the end of April 1898
- Upper Wientallinie and waistline until 1 June 1898
- Lower Wientallinie and Verbindungsbahn until 1 June 1899
- Danube canal line until the end of 1899

Ultimately, however, the postponed opening date could only be maintained at the top Wientallinie and the waistline, while the other sections delayed even further.

The Stadtbahn was built between 1894 and 1901 along with the regulation of the Wien River and the Danube Canal. Only five lines of a much larger planned network were actually constructed:

- Wientallinie (Vienna Valley line): Hütteldorf-Hacking - Hauptzollamt
- Donaukanallinie (Danube Canal line): Hauptzollamt - Heiligenstadt
- Line to the 2nd district: Hauptzollamt - Praterstern
- Gürtel line: Meidling Hauptstrasse - Westbahnhof - Heiligenstadt
- Vorortelinie (Suburban line): Hütteldorf-Hacking - Ottakring - Heiligenstadt

In addition, a brief section of elevated track was built connecting the Gürtel and Danube Canal lines between Nussdorfer Strasse and Friedensbrücke stations.

Of the lines that were not built, two lines should have crossed the inner city, and one would have extended the Gürtel line along the southern Gürtel road to Südbahnhof railway station. These would have helped the Stadtbahn be a more appealing and useful transportation system, but financial constraints prevented their construction.

The ceremonial opening of the Wiener Stadtbahn took place on 9 May 1898 with the participation of Emperor Franz Joseph I, the Vienna Archbishop Anton Josef Cardinal Gruscha, the Minister of Railways. Heinrich Ritter von Wittek, the Lower Austrian Landmarschall Baron Joseph Freiherr von Gudenus and the Vienna Mayor Karl Lueger in Michelbeuern instead. On that day the monarch drove with the k.u.k. Hofsalonzug, which consisted of his saloon car and three other cars, from there via the belt line to Heiligenstadt, then on the suburban line and the Westbahn to Hütteldorf-Hacking, continue on the upper Wientallinie to Meidling Hauptstraße and finally on the waist line to the stop Alser street, with which he traveled all sections completed so far. [4] In the last car of the special train, the emperor had an observation platform at his disposal, only there he was spared the smoke of the steam locomotive. From this ceremony the following quotation of the emperor is handed down:

"Created by the harmonious cooperation of the autonomous Curia and the state, this railway construction will, I hope, bring many advantages to the population and effectively promote the prosperous development of Vienna which is close to my heart."

It was one of the first few metros in the world, London Underground (1863), Liverpool Overhead Railway (1893), Budapest Metro (1896), Glasgow Subway (1896), and the Boston Tremont Street Subway (1897). The other three under construction are Paris Metro (1900), Berlin U-Bahn (1902) and New York City Subway (1904).

=== Integration with Verbindungsbahn ===
The already opened in 1859 section Hauptzollamt Praterstern the Verbindungsbahn - in the context of the Stadtbahn also called Prater line or line in the II district - was thereby the only existing route, which was integrated into the narrower Stadtbahn network. On this section, whose infrastructure still belonged to the state railway, Otto Wagner had until 1899 to rebuild the two existing intermediate stops according to Stadtbahn standards.

This was on the one hand the Radetzkyplatz stop, which stretched between its namesake and the Adamsgasse, and on the other hand the Praterstern stop, which was located on the bridge over the main avenue. The latter was independent of the former North Station, which was 500 meters further north. However, it was also upgraded as the terminus of the Stadtbahn in 1899 to a station and made despite the operational separation from the North Station for a better integration desselbigen in local and regional transport. The Radetzkyplatz-Praterstern section with a length of only 533 meters at the same time represented the shortest station distance in the entire Stadtbahn passenger traffic, only the distance between Alser Straße and the freight station Michelbeuern was with 517 meters even shorter. The connection Brigittabrücke-Heiligenstadt, however, was the longest section at 2590 meters.

Originally, the connecting line for the Stadtbahn was to be upgraded to three tracks. As a result, however, the Helenengasse would have been severely narrowed, on the other hand resisted, so that ultimately only an Ausziehgleis between Hauptzollamt and Radetzkyplatz arose. Regardless, the viaducts had to be rehabilitated and reinforced and the security systems renewed for the dense Stadtbahn operation.

On the connecting line initially traversed from the lower Wientallinie ago trains tied. From the commissioning of the Danube Canal Line in August 1901, the trains coming from the direction of Meidling Main Street changed then only to a very small part on the Verbindungsbahn, with commuter trains between Hauptzollamt and Praterstern replaced the dropped links, each with a locomotive front and rear were covered.

Just a few months after opening, a serious accident occurred on the suburban line, when on 6 January 1899 at 4:00 am the locomotive 30.17 was accidentally led onto a stump track shortly after leaving Heiligenstadt station. The train, which consisted of 85 empty freight cars, then overturned the buffer from Tulln to Hütteldorf-Hacking and crashed into Gunoldstraße, which ran six to seven meters below. The locomotive driver suffered heavy injuries and the heater suffered minor injuries. Exactly this accident situation at the same place repeated itself on 20 February 1928, whereby in turn no casualties were to be lamented. For Stadtbahnunglücke the Viennese Voluntary Rescue Society in the year 1900 specially a special railway ambulance car in enterprise, which was stationed in the station main customs office.

The layout of the Vienna railway network was also influenced by its uses for the military which demanded full compliance with mainline railroad rules, steam propulsion and integration with ordinary rail service; this increased costs compared to electrical light rail option. When the lines opened, in four stages between 1898 and 1901, they failed to attract mass riders due to high costs; affluent passengers were discouraged by dirt from engine smokestacks and slow speed. While primarily an urban railway line, some trains continued on the mainlines to the north and west of the city.

=== First electric routes ===
In the years 1901-1902, Siemens & Halske also carried out an experimental operation in Vienna with an electric railcar train between Heiligenstadt and the freight station Michelbeuern, which, however, took place without passengers and was canceled again for financial reasons, Here, the track was provided with a running midway between the rails U-shaped track, which was fed with 500 volts DC. The return of the current was carried by the rails connected with copper bars. The - as in steam operation - up to ten-part sample train consisted of railcar and sidecar, both adaptations of ordinary light rail vehicles were. The former received shunt motors directly mounted on the axles for the test. From these the engineers hoped for the advantages of a simple cruise control as well as a considerable recovery of electrical energy in driving through the numerous downhills of the Stadtbahn. To brake the train was in addition to the normal hand brakes, the continuous air suction brake available. In addition, the engines were equipped with a tram-type short-circuit brake.

A second attempt at electrification was made by the Prague-based company Křizík & Co in the years 1906-1907 between the stations Hauptzollamt and Praterstern. For this purpose, Křizík built its own substation, which fed the line with two times 1500 volts DC in three-wire arrangement, which in addition to the double-pole overhead line, the rails were needed as a central conductor. As a trial locomotive was a two-axle locomotive with center driver's use, which was designated as Vienna 1 and later to the Czechoslovak state railway Československé státní dráhy (ČSD) arrived.

=== World War I ===
The outbreak of the First World War was a major setback for the Stadtbahn. Their entire network was from the general mobilization on 31 July 1914 now actually the troop transport of the military, the civilian passenger transport was henceforth only possible under restrictions. Their military task, however, they could fully meet. As on other rail lines in the country, it came again and again to total settings of regular passenger traffic, so for the first time from 6 August 1914 and again from 26 May 1915. One of the reasons for the restrictions was the lack of staff because more and more employees received their convocation. As a substitute, therefore, women had to be employed on the tram for the first time as of June 1915, as was previously the case with the tram service, but they only took over the station services. However, in order to ensure a quick and smooth transition, the administration hired only the wives and daughters of male employees.

In addition, served 461 Stadtbahnwagen, that is slightly more than half of the total inventory, the army. Thus, the Ministry of Railways, at the suggestion of the k.u.k. Ministry of War, alone the Austrian Red Cross twelve patient transport trains formed by Stadtbahn vehicles with 25 cars each. These state railway diseases consisted of carriages of the III. Class, they could - on inserted field carriers - 72 Lying and 225-seated wounded transport. The patients were invited through two window openings in the side walls, which were closed by a flap.

Less than a month after the end of the war, the Stadtbahn had to be imported due to a shortage of coal, which now had to be imported from the war-looted mining districts, on 8 December 1918 almost completely set again. Only the suburb line remained in operation almost throughout, even during and after the war, albeit at times greatly thinned. While in 1907 still 67 trains daily reversed, there were 1917/1918 only 50 trains and 1919 even only 22 trains. Only in 1920, the frequency increased again to 42 trains, 1921 then drove even 54 trains daily.

=== Coal shortage ===
In 1918, services came to a halt due to the coal shortage after World War I. Subsequently, the Wiental, Donaukanal, and Gürtel lines were leased by the city of Vienna. They were electrified and reopened in 1925 under the name "Wiener Elektrische Stadtbahn" (Vienna Electric Metropolitan Railway).

As a result of the collapse of the Habsburg monarchy, the dissolution of Austria-Hungary, which took place in the autumn of 1918 and 1919/1920 was confirmed in peace treaties, the state railway lost much interest in the Vienna Stadtbahn; even the earlier military considerations no longer mattered. In addition, the Federal Constitution, passed on 10 November 1920, and the divorce law of 29 December 1921 based on it, led to the detachment of the municipality of Vienna from the province of Lower Austria, so that two federal states had to coordinate with each other in Stadtbahn traffic into the surrounding area.

Due to the new outskirts of Vienna in the fledgling Republic of Austria, the traffic flows had also changed greatly, especially the traffic to the north and east collapsed almost completely. In addition, as a result of the war for the first time ever in history, the population of the capital fell, and the prospect that Vienna would grow to four million inhabitants, was now no longer realistic. Thus, from the point of view of the former operator, no profitable Stadtbahn traffic could be expected. Furthermore, the fumes of the steam operation had - as already feared at the opening - especially the reinforced concrete ceilings and metal girders in the tunnel structures heavily added, so that the infrastructure of the Stadtbahn was in poor condition after the war. The tunnel ceilings then had to be repaired using the so-called Torkret method, i.e. the use of injection cement.

It was not until 1 June 1922 reversed on the upper Wientallinie and the belt line again Stadtbahn trains, as the state railway to relieve the Westbahnhof and the Franz-Josefs-Bahnhofs a so-called reconciliation established in the relation Neulengbach - St. Andrä-Wördern and thus two Provisionally reinstated routes. However, these trains served on the two reactivated sections only selected intermediate stations, these were under St. Veit Baumgarten, Hietzing, Meidling main street, Gumpendorfer road, stop Westbahnhof, Währinger road and Nussdorfer road. As of 1 June 1923 they also stopped in the stations Ober St. Veit and Josefstädter Straße, but accounted for the station Nußdorfer road. Already on 30 September 1924, this reconciliation traffic ended as a result of the progressing electrification work again.

Furthermore, lost as a result of the proclamation of the Republic of German Austria on 12 November 1918, the court pavilion in Hietzing his function and then served for a long time the sculptor Sepp Haberl-Carlo as a studio. The pavilion had previously been used by the Kaiser only twice, on 16 July 1899 to visit the lower Wientallinie and on 12 April 1902 to visit the Danube Canal Line. For his travels, however, he also preferred after the opening of the Stadtbahn the nearby station Penzing, for special visitors, the station was frequented again and again.

Under the new line scheme, each line was assigned a single letter (D (Donaukanal), G (Gürtel) und W (Wienfluss)) which could be combined with other letters to indicate the lines served (like G, GD, DG, and WD). Also notable is line 18G, which was operated until 1945 and ran from Heiligenstadt to Gumpendorfer Strasse station and then along the course of tram line number 18 to Ostbahnhof railway station.

Many stations and numerous sections of the lines were destroyed in World War II. Reconstruction of the lines took until 1955, and some of the historic stations were never rebuilt. In 1968 it was decided to integrate the Stadtbahn lines into the city's new subway system. Conversion of line WD to line U4 was completed in 1981; conversion of lines G and GD to line U6 in 1989. Since then, the term "Stadtbahn" has disappeared from official use.

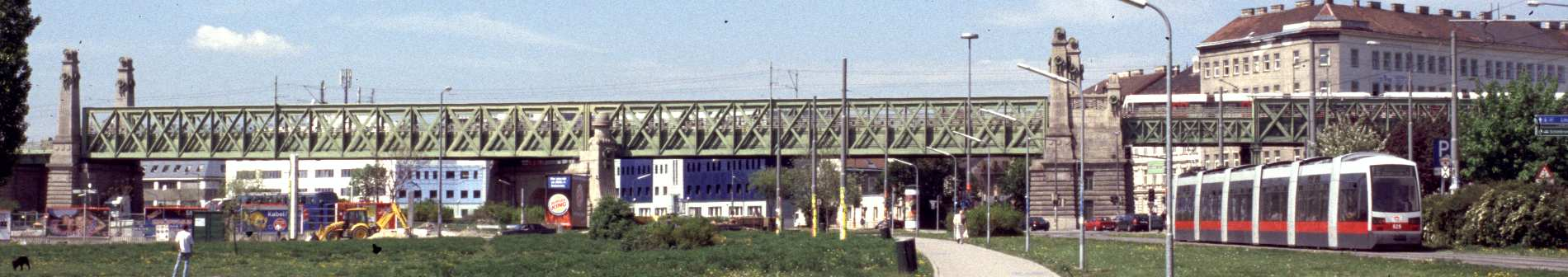
Bridge over the left Wienzeile

== Rolling stock ==
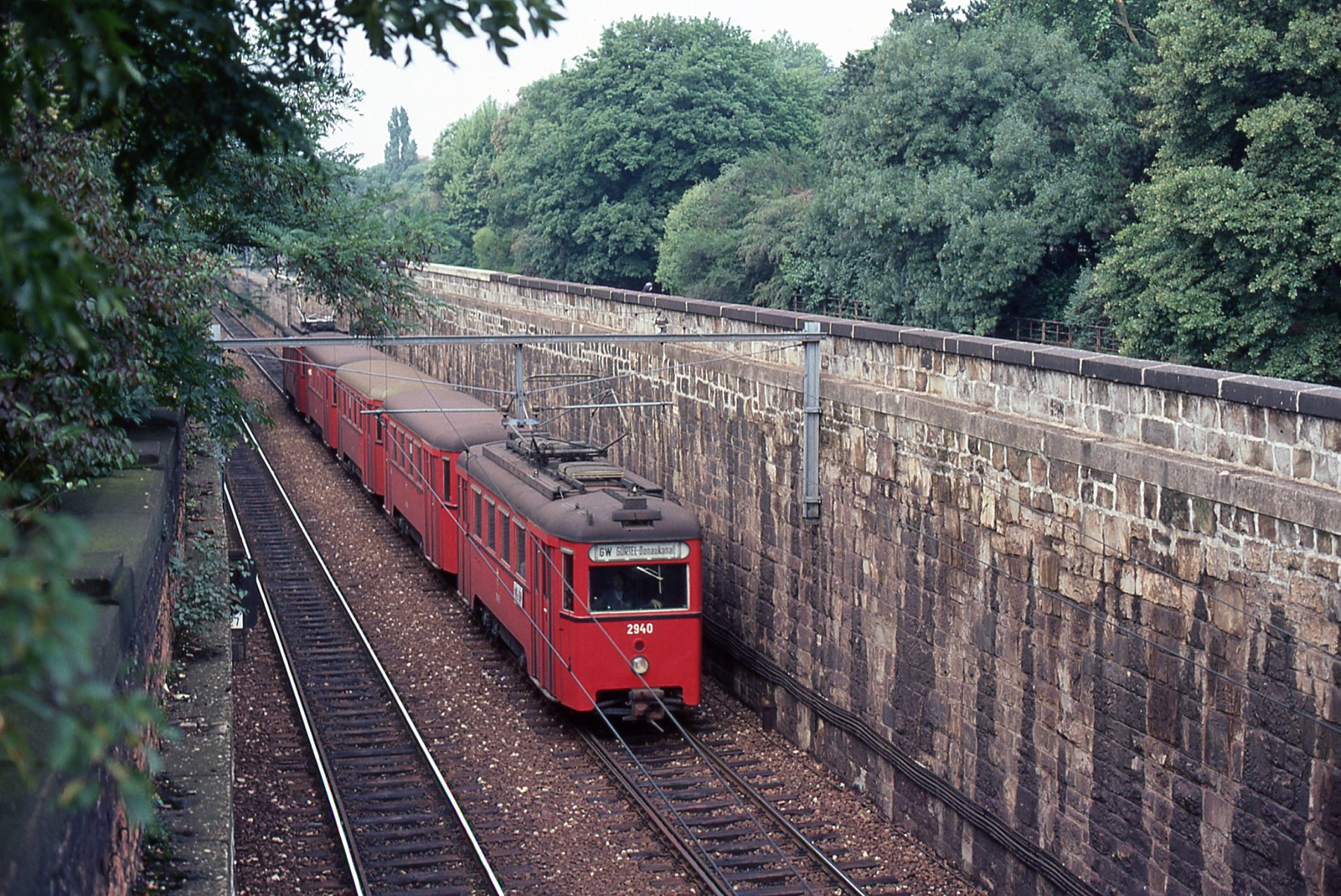
Class N1 Viennese Stadtbahn train, at the Wiental line near Schönbrunn

A special type of steam engine, kkStB class 30, was designed by the Austrian engineer Karl Gölsdorf specifically for use on the Stadtbahn. The engine was optimized for quick acceleration, to suit the tight curves and steep inclines of the lines, and to emit a minimum of smoke, which was essential for the tunnel sections. The passenger cars were 2-axle trailers that were rather freely based on a design by Otto Wagner.

The new type of rolling stock introduced after electrification was designed so that it could also run on the tramway network. It consisted of 2-axle motor cars (class N), heavy trailers (class n) and light trailers (class n1), which were combined to form trains of up to nine cars in length. These were in operation until 1964.

From the mid-1950s onwards, these cars were completely rebuilt using steel frames and new electric equipment. These were referred to as class N1 (motor cars) and class n2 (trailers) and were used well into the 1980s.

From 1980 onwards, the class N1 and n2 cars were gradually replaced by new six-axle articulated cars. These are referred to as class E6 (motor cars) and c6 (trailers) and are based on the Duewag "Mannheim" design. These were in service until the Stadtbahn service officially ended in 1989.

== Conversion to U-Bahn ==
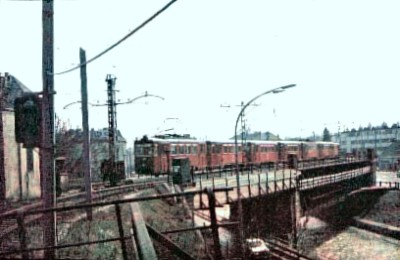
Stadtbahn crossing the Stadtbahn bridge over the Wien River in Hütteldorf – now part of the U-Bahn line U4

The municipality of Vienna had tried to integrate the Stadtbahn into the tram network, but this was rejected in 1923. In 1925, they formed the Viennese Electric Light Rail, abbreviated W.E.St. After comparatively rapid electrification and numerous smaller adaptations, it gradually went into operation between 3 June 1925 and 20 October 1925. It followed the same lines as the Stadtbahn, but with tram cars rather than main line railway cars. At the same time, a new community tax was put in place to fund the system.

In 1925, the electrified network was completely separated from the rest of the railway network and linked to the urban tram network at two points by the mixed operating line 18G. They used - also in the pure Stadtbahn traffic - classic two-axle tram cars, which were considered over the decades as a trademark of the electric Stadtbahn. For the 450 engines and sidecars purchased at that time, the new operator built three new operating stations in Michelbeuern, Heiligenstadt and Hütteldorf-Hacking and hired 823 new employees for the new company branch.

The dissolution of the Commission for Traffic Facilities in Vienna in 1934 finally sealed the end of the original steam railway. As a result, the municipality of Vienna also took over the infrastructure of the electrified network, which was henceforth licensed only as a small train without freight traffic, while the suburban line then completely fell to the state railway. The Second World War hit hard, especially in the last year of the war in 1945, the electric Stadtbahn, they could not be completely reactivated until 1954. At the latest in the 1960s, the Stadtbahn was subject to a modernization backlog, because the subway planning came at that time only slowly. It was not until 1976 that the first Stadtbahn section was converted to subway operation. On 7 October 1989 ultimately received the two belt lines G and GD, the sign of the last two Stadtbahn lines ever, the new line signal U6. Thus, apart from the remaining infrastructure, the history of Wiener Stadtbahn ended after more than 91 years.

From 1976 onwards, the Stadtbahn was integrated into the newly established Vienna U-Bahn system. For line U4, most of the stations of the Wiental and Donaukanal lines of the Stadtbahn were completely rebuilt. Platforms were raised to 95 cm (37 in) and current collection changed from overhead lines to third rail. While some of the station entrances at street level have been preserved, only Stadtpark station remains largely in its original form at platform level. New U-Bahn trains (class U), built by the Austrian manufacturer SGP, were introduced.

Line U6, which had been the Gürtel line of the Stadtbahn, was left mostly unchanged. The station architecture by Otto Wagner was preserved wherever possible. Only the signalling and electric components have been updated, stations and viaducts have been renovated, and the travel direction was changed from left-hand to right-hand running. A complete conversion of all stations and track to U-Bahn would have been too expensive considering the limited loading gauge offered by the historic lines. The class E6 and c6 Stadtbahn rolling stock remained in service but was phased out by the end of the year 2008 and has since 1995 been complemented and finally replaced by new class T and T1 low-floor rolling stock.

== Conversion to S-Bahn ==
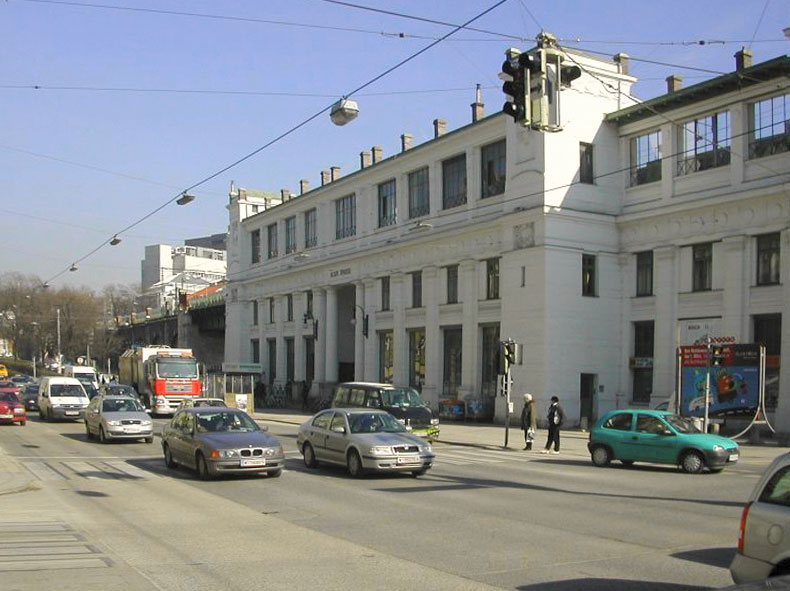
Alserstraße station, on the Gürtel

On the suburban line the regular passenger traffic of the steam railway ended to 11 July 1932, while from 1936 the second track was removed. However, the freight traffic remained. In addition, at least the summer bathing trains to Praterspitz still operated until 27 August 1939, which no longer served the stops Oberdöbling and Unterdöbling. In addition, they were also important for the 1927 opened Hohe Warte bath and the 1928 congress bath opened. In contrast to the electrified sections of the Stadtbahn, the suburban line, which was located away from the important bombing targets, survived the Second World War largely unscathed. In the years 1950 and 1951, for example, it was already possible to travel from the suburban line to spa trains to Kritzendorf and St. Andrä-Wördern.

Subsequently, the track fell increasingly, due to maintenance deficiencies, she was temporarily only passable with a maximum of 25 km/h. This led in 1978 to a temporary ban on passenger trains. Already in 1979, however, the municipality of Vienna, the Austrian Federal Railways and the federal government agreed to a reactivation, this step took place not least in view of the establishment of the Verkehrsverbund Ost-Region (VOR) in 1984. Finally, the suburban line was also electrified with alternating current, expanded to double track again and also switched to right-hand drive. The stations Oberdöbling and Breitensee as well as the originally not existing station Krottenbachstraße were rebuilt, while the station Unterdöbling remained permanently open. On 31 May 1987, passenger services were resumed on the S45 line. In 1993 she was extended from Heiligenstadt to a temporary station at the Floridsdorfer bridge. In 1996, this was abandoned and extended the S45 to the newly built traffic station Handelskai. Initially, the 4020 series was used on the suburban line, which has since been replaced by the 4024 series.

The connection to the main customs office at Praterstern remained as part of the connecting railway Hütteldorf Hacking north station, starting from 1921 also again with passenger traffic, in continuous operation. It has been part of the S-Bahn trunk line since 1959, the busiest section in the Vienna S-Bahn network, and has been electrified since 1962. Trains of the 4020 and 4024 trains are also used today, as well as the new 4744/4746. However, the station Radetzkyplatz has not been in operation since the interwar period and was demolished after the Second World War.

On the Westbahn in turn, the Stadtbahn trains were replaced after the First World War by the so-called Purkersdorfer commuter trains, but only in May 1931 did these begin operation. This shuttle service between Hütteldorf-Hacking and Unter Purkersdorf existed until 27 May 1972. In 1944, for example, this relation was listed under the stand-alone Kursbuchtabelle 459e, with a rigid 30-minute cycle over the entire operating time. At times, it even drove every 15 minutes. Meanwhile, the Hütteldorf Neulengbach section of the 1952 electrified Westbahn is served by the S50.

The Franz-Josefs-Bahn to Tulln is used by the S40 today, this section having been electrified since 1978.

== Criticism ==
The steam operation was heavily criticized from the beginning by both professionals and the population. The concept of a steam-powered subway was already considered technically outdated at its opening in 1898. The only other place with a steam-powered subway was London, apart from the City and South London Railway which had opened in 1890 as an electrified line; all older lines were converted to electric power between 1901 and 1908. By contrast, all other subways worldwide were electric from the outset, or operated as a cableway, as in Glasgow, or as a funicular, as in Istanbul and Lyon.

Moreover, the steam railway operation also resulted in the passengers and the train crew on the underground sections being largely unprotected from the smoke. In addition, the soot settled on the seats and soiled them, and thus also the garments of the passengers, even before the journey. In addition, the locomotives also damaged the infrastructure of the railway itself, because the smoke caused the rapid corrosion of the exposed iron structural parts of the superstructure and generated dust that infiltrated the carriages. The problem of rusting intensified due to the water vapour that emanated from the locomotive and in winter from the heating pipes. Due to the dense train sequence in both directions of travel, the resulting strong smoke and steam masses were able to escape the tunnels only very slowly, especially in cloudy and foggy weather. At Ferdinandsbrücke station, the operator even experimented at times with powerful fans to extract the smoke before entering the underground station, but these attempts were unsuccessful.

In addition, the white-plastered station buildings in particular discoloured quickly. For example, the facade of the Hietzinger Hofpavillon had to be repaired for the first time just three years after opening, and surrounding buildings were also affected. This problem was particularly evident on the marble statues of the former Elisabeth Bridge. After demolition of the bridge in 1897, they were initially placed at Karlsplatz station. However, they were so quickly polluted that they received the nickname 'The eight chimney sweepers' and had to be transferred to the Rathausplatz in 1902. And having a steam railway right in front of their house was not particularly popular with the local residents either, as the satirical weekly Kikeriki already ridiculed in its opening month of May 1898:

"How was B. suddenly deaf? He had his window open for half an hour on the Girdle!

- Kikeriki, May 1898

And even the relatively low speed of the steam trains inspired the humorists:

"Why are you making such a sad sight? I'm from the express train of the Stadtbahn and during the fastest part, my hat, my stick and my glasses fell from the car! So what? And I could only pick up the stick and the glasses! "

- Kikeriki, May 1898

The only arguments in favour of steam operation were the lower construction costs and the strategic military function of the rail network. The chosen form of operation seemed more flexible in this respect, as there was no network of electrified railway lines in Central Europe for decades to come.
