= James Clark Bunten (engineer) =

British engineer

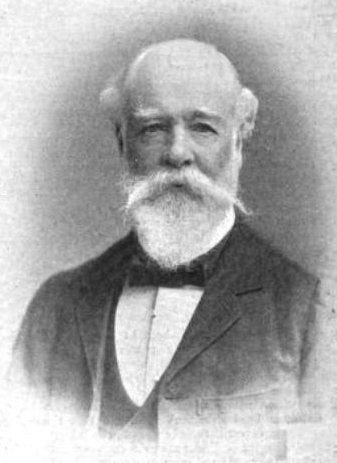
- In The Sketch, 9 March 1898
- Born: 23 January 1838; Glasgow, Scotland
- Died: 9 July 1901 (aged 63); Richmond, England
- Occupation: Engineer
- Spouse: Jessie Maclure (m. 1865)
- Children: 1

James Clark Bunten (1838–1901) was a British engineer born in the Scottish city of Glasgow, who went on to be a partner in the Anderston Foundry and chairman of the Caledonian Railway.

== Biography ==
James Clark Bunten was born on 23 January 1838, the son of Mr. Robert Bunten, a merchant of Glasgow, and his wife Agnes, née Clark. He served an apprenticeship at the Anderston Foundry in Glasgow, and went on to become a partner and the manager of the foundry.

He married Jessie Maclure on 1 June 1865, and they had one daughter.

The works at Anderston were extended under his management, and a large foundry and machine shop was also established at Middlesbrough, in north-eastern England. The Anderston Foundry was heavily involved in the manufacture of railway equipment, and, on 10 May 1881, Bunten was appointed a director of the Caledonian Railway, one of Scotland's principal railway companies. In 1897 he was appointed chairman of that company, a role he retained until 1901. Besides his roles with the Anderton Foundry and the Caledonian Railway, he was also a director of the Bank of Scotland and Director of the Bank of Scotland and a member of the Scottish Board of the Liverpool and London Globe Insurance Company.

James Clark Bunten died, aged 63, on 9 July 1901, at Richmond in Surrey.
