= Hütteldorf station =

Vienna U-Bahn station

Hütteldorf
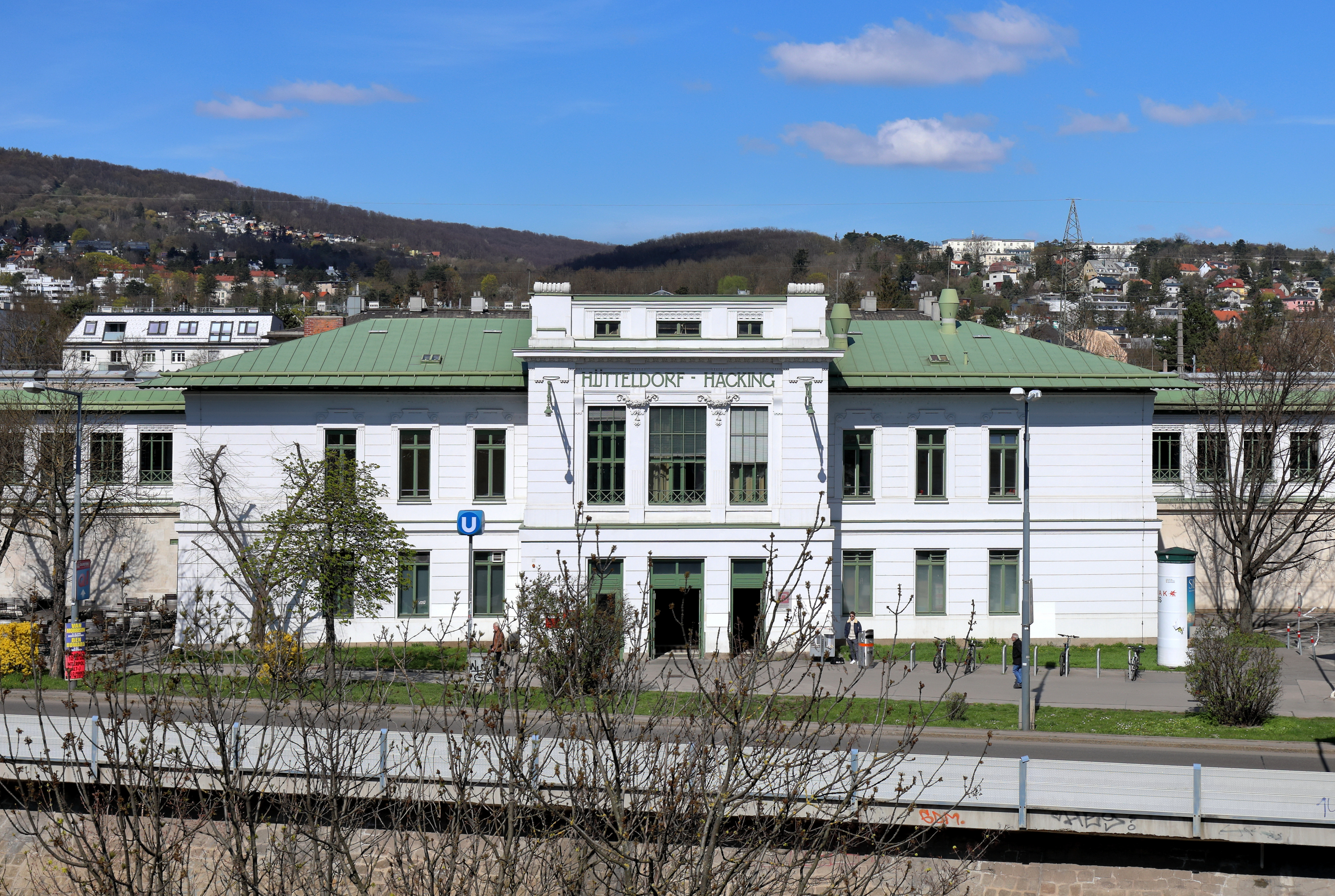

General information
- Location: Keißlergasse 5, Penzing, Vienna; Austria
- Coordinates: 48.1970°N 16.2609°E
- Lines: (Interchange); P+R
- Tracks: 6 tracks (11, 1, 3, 4, 5, 6), tracks 7 and 8 were closed around 2005.

History
- Opened: 1858 (railway station), 1898 (Stadtbahn station), 1981 (U4 station)

Services
Preceding station	Wiener Linien	Following station
Terminus	U4	Ober St. Veit toward Heiligenstadt
Location

Hütteldorf is the endstation on U4 of the Vienna U-Bahn. The U-Bahn station is housed within a train shed at the Wien Hütteldorf railway station, which is also served by long distance (WEST, Railjet, IC), rapid (D) and regional trains (REX, CJX), and by Vienna S-Bahn lines S45, S50 and S80.

Both stations are located in the 14th district called Penzing. The U-Bahn station opened in 1981.

== History ==
The Hütteldorf Railway Station opened in 1858. At first there was only the Kaiserin-Elisabeth-Bahn, later called Westbahn. In 1898 the Wiener Stadt- und Verbindungsbahn (Stadtbahn) opened. In the first 27 years it handled steam trains and in 1925 it was electrified. Until 2015 there were more train lines at Hütteldorf railway station, but then the new Wien Hauptbahnhof was built and Many lines ended service to Hütteldorf and started operating to the Hauptbahnhof.

== Trains ==
Trains and Schnellbahn: At the station you can find many trains:

- S45: Also called Vorortelinie (Suburban line) is a "Schnellbahn"' and operates between Wien Hütteldorf and Wien Handelskai.
- S50: A Schnellbahn from Wien Westbahnhof to Eichgraben-Altlengbach which is a station in the Vienna Forest in Lower Austria.
- S80: A second line which only operates in Vienna from Wien Hütteldorf to Wien Aspern Nord.
- REX 50/51: Regional express-trains which have less stations than the S50 and can travel faster. Those trains operate between Wien Westbahnhof and St. Pölten Hauptbahnhof.
- CJX (Cityjet Xpress): It‘s a Rapid train and a fast alternative for people who are busy.
- WESTbahn: A private train-company operating from Wien Westbahnhof to Linz, Salzburg, St. Johann im Pongau, München, Stuttgart, Innsbruck, Bregenz and Lindau
