= Harbours in Vienna =

Coordinates: 48°9′36.06″N 16°29′38.39″E

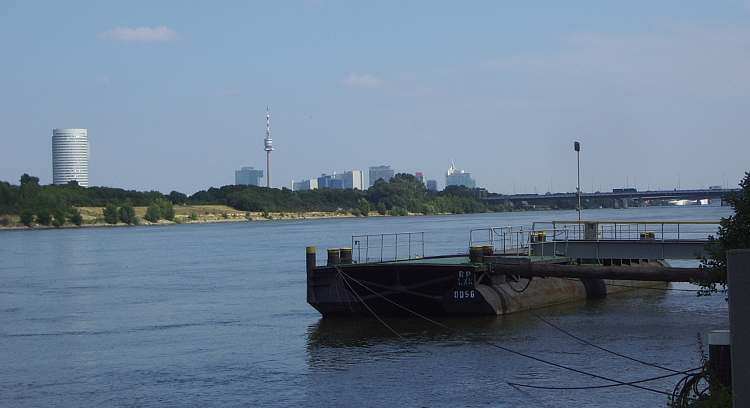
A view of the Danube from the harbour in Nußdorf

For a long time, it was not necessary to build a Harbour in Vienna, because the existing natural landing points were sufficient for the level of trade on the Danube. It was only when steamships began to arrive in great numbers that a harbour offering safe berths became essential. Even then however, goods were for the most part loaded and unloaded at an unenclosed river harbour that was established at the end of the 19th century.

== During the Habsburg monarchy ==
At the time of the Habsburg monarchy, it was possible to berth at the natural landing points along the Danube, and at the harbour in the Wiener Neustadt Canal. This harbour was originally located near where the Wien Mitte train station now stands; in 1847, it was moved to the site of the Aspangbahnhof.

=== Natural landing points ===
At first, ships could land in Vienna at the naturally occurring landing points on the Danube. These were flat sections of river bank with a surface of sand or gravel, onto which ships could be dragged to be loaded or unloaded.

Such landing sites required access to the adjoining ground further inland so that the goods delivered by boat could be transported further afield using horses and carts.

Landing points were located inter alia in Heiligenstadt, Nußdorf, Roßauer and Brigittenau. The Salzgries was also used as a landing site, primarily for ships carrying salt (Salz in German).

=== The unenclosed river harbour ===
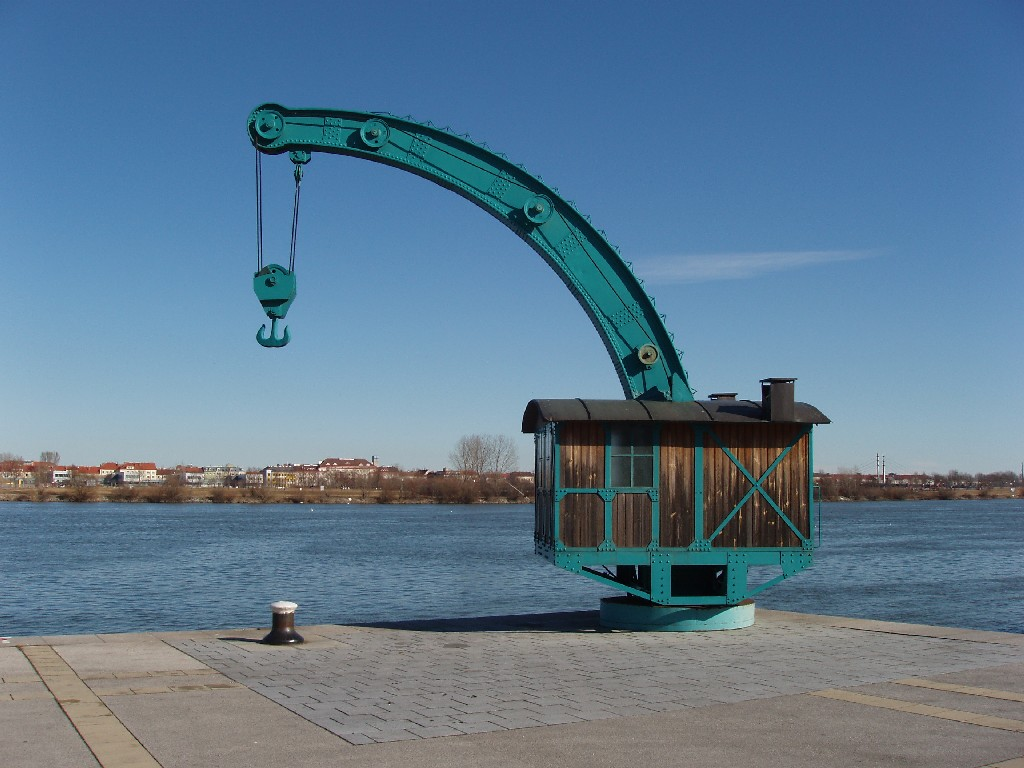
A crane at the river harbour

Not a lot is known about the construction of the unenclosed river harbour.

The harbour was established sometime after the regulation of the Danube in 1875 on the right-hand bank of the Danube. As the Donaudampfschiffahrtsgesellschaft essentially commanded a monopoly over cargo and passenger transport on the Danube at the time, it seems likely that the company was the sole owner of almost the entire harbour until the end of World War I and the subsequent collapse of Austria-Hungary. After this time, the shipping companies of other states on the Danube had berths with warehouses, storerooms, and sheds as well as the necessary equipment to load and unload ships. The City of Vienna also owned refrigerated warehouses here.

Farthest upstream was an oil and petrol storage facility. This stood on a section of the river bank that was approximately three kilometres long and was the site of 50 tanks belonging to the oil companies Vacuum, Shell, Nova, Fanto AG and Redeventza.

The river harbour occupied a stretch of river bank some 12 kilometres long. It offered ships no protection whatsoever when the river flooded or froze over. The harbour was connected to the surrounding area by the Donauuferbahn and the Handelskai, which ran parallel to the Danube, thereby limiting the space available to the harbour to a thin strip some 75 metres across.

=== The Danube Canal ===
The expansion of the Danube Canal into a freight and passenger harbour offering protection from flooding and winter weather was enacted in an 1892 law concerning Vienna's transport facilities. The law also called for the building of a local rail network.

The works were to include the creation of a flood control structure near Nußdorf. Wilhelm von Engerth's floating barrier, the Schwimmtor, which entered service in 1873, did not provide sufficient protection. Three, possibly four weirs with locks were also planned to ensure the necessary water depth for passing ships. Another flood control structure near the point where the Danube Canal joined the Danube was to be considered in order to prevent floodwater from the river washing back into the canal.

The law envisaged the creation of temporary quays between the Augartenbrücke and the Franzensbrücke on both sides of the Danube Canal. Near the mouth of the Wien River, an area 95 by 200 metres was dug out to create a basin in which ships could turn around. This was however later filled in again and the Hermannpark was established in its stead.

The authorities did not have the money to build both the rail network and to carry out the envisaged work on the Danube Canal at the same time. The army also lobbied for the rail network, which connected the various military installations in Vienna. As a result, the Wiener Stadtbahn was built first.

By 1923, when the project manager, engineer Ludwig Brandl, reported on progress in number 13 of the trade magazine Die Wasserwirtschaft (Water management), the flood barrier in Nußdorf (which had been built between 1894 and 1898), the Kaiserbadwehr (a weir and lock built between 1904 and 1908) and the quays downstream of the Augartenbrücke had been completed, but the money required to turn the Danube Canal into a proper harbour had not been made available.

Otto Wagner was tasked by the Kommission für Verkehrsanlagen (Commission for Transport Facilities) in December 1896 with the design of the quays. In line with his plans, the 15-metre wide quays were built with sites for a fish market, a berth for passenger ships and loading bays for freight. Wager also designed the Nußdorf and Kaiserbadwehr locks and weirs and the attached houses.

Although there was no money to finance the running of the facilities in Nußdorf, they were necessary to protect against flooding and were kept in operation. Because the income required was too great to be obtained through charging a usage fee for the locks, the construction of a hydroelectric plant near Simmering was proposed. According to the proposal, the electricity that the plant produced could have been sold to generate the finances necessary to operate the flood control mechanisms.

=== The harbour in Freudenau (the winter harbour, river kilometre 1920.1) ===
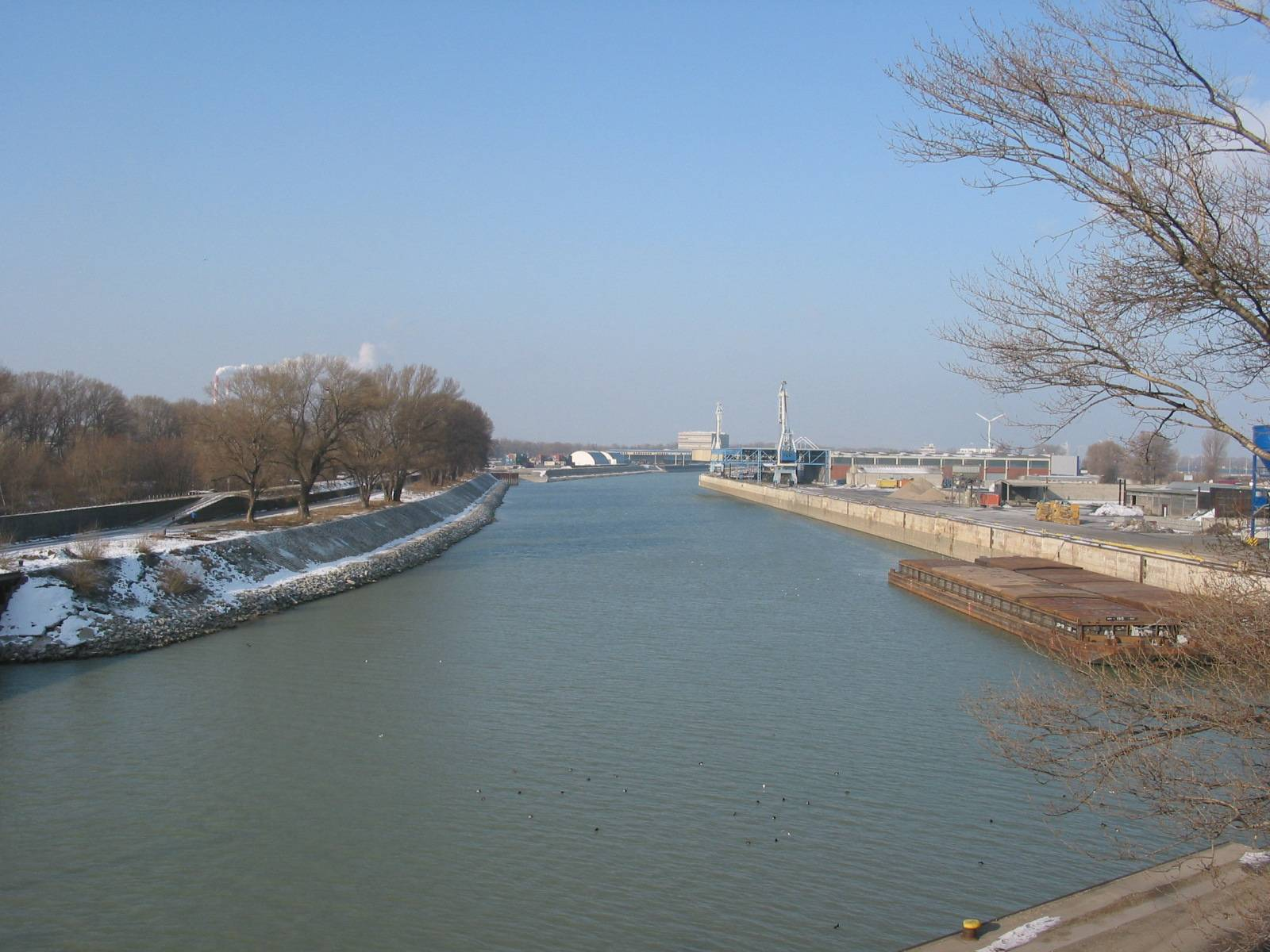
The winter harbour in Freudenau

The harbour in Freudenau, which was designed as a winter harbour, had been envisaged in an arm of the Danube between the Danube and the Danube Canal as part of the regulation of the river in the 19th century. A lack of funding had however prevented the construction of the harbour and only preparatory works could be completed.

When part of the preparatory works was destroyed in a flood and ships that had been moored here for the winter were later damaged by ice on the river, it became necessary to increase the level of protection that the site offered.

Construction began on 8 August 1899 and the harbour was opened on 10 October 1902. Even before it had been finished, it was being used during the winter months by ships seeking a safe haven.

In 1925, the winter harbour was also home to a landing site for flying boats and seaplanes, which was used by the Austrian airline Österreichische Luftverkehrs AG and the Hungarian company Aero-Express.

Seaplanes were stationed here during World War II. Their task was to eliminate mines that had been dropped on the river by Allied aircraft; the mines were intended to prevent the transport of oil from Romanian oil fields to the oil refinery in Lobau and are supposed to have sunk as many as 300 tankers. The harbour in Freudenau was furthermore used as a stop-over point for flying boats en route between the Mediterranean Sea and northern Germany.

=== The harbour in Kuchelau ===
The harbour in Kuchelau was created between 1901 and 1903 by building a harbour wall that separated it from the Danube. It was intended to serve as a holding point for ships waiting to pass the lock near Nußdorf on their way towards the Danube Canal.

=== Plans to expand Vienna's harbours during the Habsburg monarchy and the First Republic ===
Although Vienna was no longer the centre of an empire after the collapse of Austria-Hungary, thought was still put into the possibility of constructing further harbour facilities. Only plans that had already existed during the Monarchy were finally realised, adapted as and where necessary to meet new demands.

In 1923 the project manager, engineer Ludwig Brandl, wrote an article entitled "Die Ausgestaltung der Hafenanlagen in Wien" ("Plans for harbour facilities in Vienna"), in which he presented the different possibilities. These were as follows:

- A freight harbour near Albern

This plan envisaged the creation of a freight harbour near Albern between the Danube Canal, the Donauuferbahn and the right-hand flood barrier along the Schwechat River. The new harbour, which would have boasted three basins and the necessary rail connections, would have been accessible from the Danube Canal.

- An industrial and freight harbour in Simmering

The industrial and freight harbour in Simmering was planned between the Ostbahnbrücke and the Donauuferbahn. It would have stood to the rear of the former artillery barracks in Kaiserebersdorf where the waste processing plant now is.

This plan also envisaged the construction of a basin alongside the Danube Canal with five subsidiary basins and a range of rail connections.

- An industrial harbour in Freudenau

The lower reaches of the Danube Canal were to be widened, so that ships could moor there without blocking the path of other ships passing through. The additional harbour basin that the plan envisaged would have been in the area of the Galopprennplatz Freudenau.

- An overflow sluice

The plan for an overflow sluice was a precursor to the Donauinsel. In his article, Brandl describes the state of the plan in 1923, but the basic idea of digging an overflow canal to protect the city of Vienna from floods had been around since 1911.

In the plan, the approximately 80-metre wide overflow sluice would have branched away from the Danube near Langenzersdorf. It would have made its way through the flood plain and would have joined the river again some 12 kilometres downstream of Vienna.

In the case of a flood, the sluice was meant to be able to draw in 2,400 cubic metres of water per second.

The banks of the river which would have been raised could have been used as loading bays and for industrial installations.

Furthermore, the plan envisaged dividing the sluice into three sections by means of two weirs, and using it in addition to its role as a canal for ships and as a harbour to generate electricity, which would have made it more profitable.

The project manager of the Lower Austrian Donau-Regulierungs-Kommission (Danube Regulation Commission) also reported on the proposal to dig an overflow canal through the flood plain and then to turn the canal into a harbour in 1920, although not in as much detail.

It is not known why none of these projects was realised, but it can be assumed that they were victims of a lack of funding and/or of the Great Depression.

== During the First Republic ==
Following the collapse of Austria-Hungary, the winter harbour in Freudenau, which until then had been the property of the state, came into the possession of the City of Vienna. The city, which was already suffering from a shortage of funds, was not able to invest anything in the city's harbours, which only cost money and did not directly generate any income.

== 1938 – 1945 ==
In a document from 1942, Otto Broschek, the head of the harbour administration, described the state of Vienna's harbour facilities (the unenclosed river harbour and the winter harbour) and their qualities, projects (the harbour in Simmering) and works that had actually been realised (the harbours in Albern and Lobau), as well as the plans to expand them following victory in the war (Endsieg).

Broschek's report was intended as a summary of the plans for the time after the final victory, when Vienna was to have an important role for shipping on the Danube, but it also highlights the difficulties that were being experienced in the immediate realisation of this goal due to the war.

=== The harbour near Albern (River kilometre 1918.3) ===
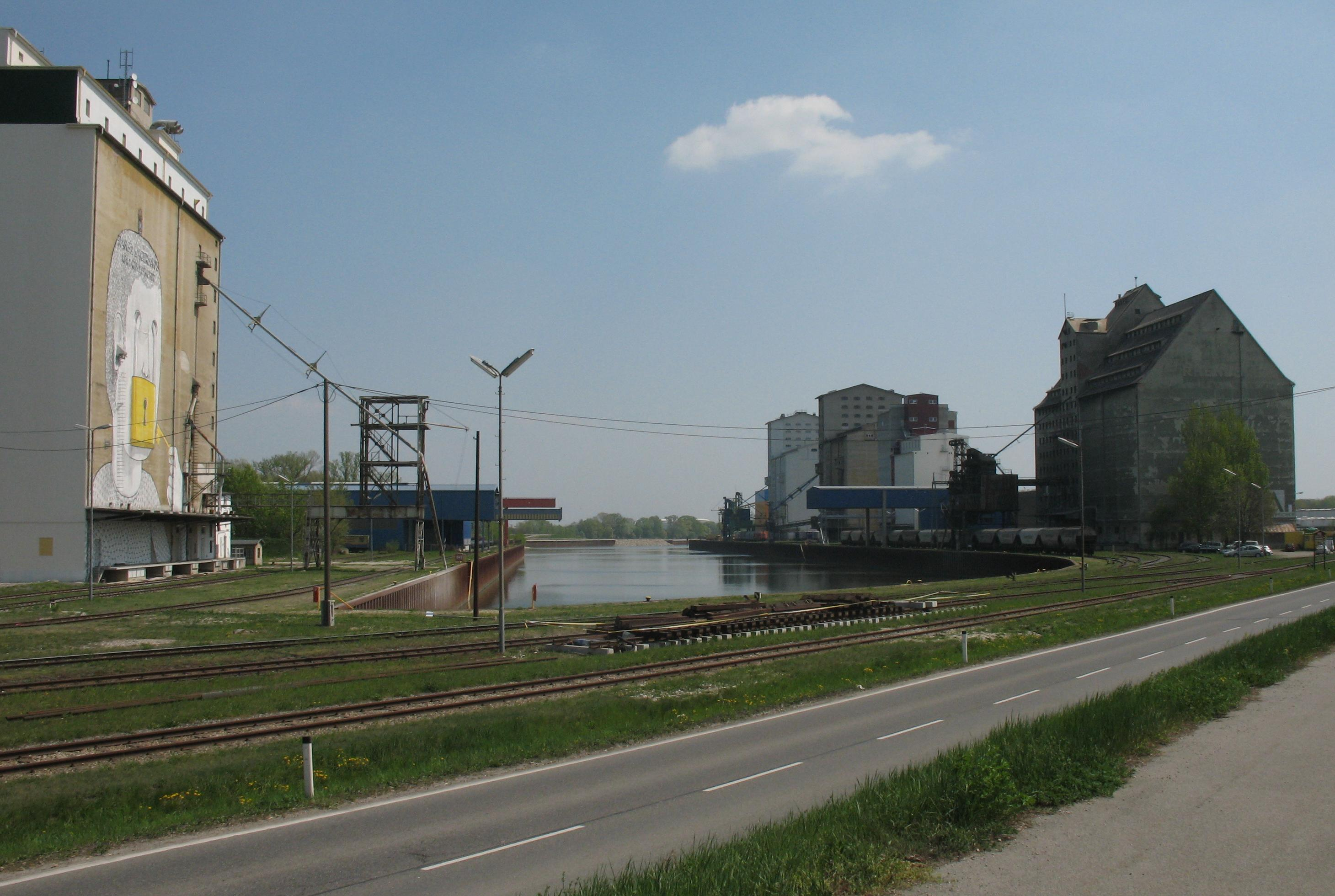
Harbour near Albern

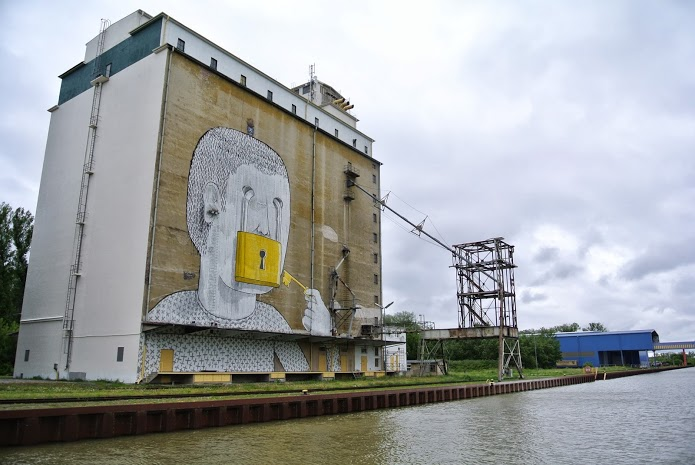
Blu's mural on the harbour's northern granary, 2010-2013

The construction of a freight harbour near Albern, the plans for which engineer Ludwig Brandl had described in 1923 as one of several possibilities for the expansion of Vienna's harbour facilities, was selected for realisation by the Reich Ministry of Transport (German: Reichsverkehrsministerium) from amongst several available options on 2 January 1939.

Work began on 13 March 1939, and on 2 October 1941, the first tugboat entered the completed first harbour basin. The harbour was equipped with five granaries, as a result of which the harbour was given the nickname "grain harbour". As such, it was to serve as a logistic node of a future geo- and biopolitical order, designated for the transshipment of grain from the annexed or economically colonized regions of eastern and south-eastern Europe to the heartlands of Nazi Germany. For the construction of the harbour basin and the granaries forced labour was employed.

As another two basins were only meant to be built after the end of the war and would not have been used for loading and unloading grain, Otto Broschek felt that the notion "grain harbour" was an exaggeration. According to the thinking at the time, the lack of available space on land only made it possible to erect processing plants; there was not enough space for industrial enterprises.

In order to ensure that the water in the harbour was regularly exchanged so as to prevent faeces from the Danube Canal from flowing into the harbour, the authorities considered directing the water used to cool the power plant in Simmering into the basin. It was hoped that this water, which would be warm, would furthermore help to prevent the harbour from icing over, thus allowing it to stay open during winter.

The creation of the harbour at Albern changed the current flows in this section of the Danube. As a result, the bodies of people who had drowned in the river were rarely swept ashore here, as had been the case in the past. The remains of such individuals had previously been buried in the Friedhof der Namenlosen (Cemetery of the Nameless).

In order to protect ships against the magnetic mines that the Royal Air Force began dropping on the Danube from 1944, a de-magnetisation device was built in the harbour at Albern. All ships on the Danube had to make use of this device in regular intervals. Tugboats could be de-magnetised for around two months, motorboats around one month.

In 2010 the Italian street artist BLU was invited to create a mural for one of the granaries, reflecting on the overdue historical and social commemoration of the harbour's construction history and the forced labourers who built it. The piece was destroyed in autumn 2013 in the course of renovation works on the granary's facade.

=== The harbour in Lobau (River kilometre 1916.4) ===
The construction of the harbour in Lobau (today known as the "Oil harbour") was closely linked to the construction of the Donau-Oder-Kanal. This the plans for this long-discussed project were already drawn up for large sections of the proposed route; only the question of where in Vienna the canal should empty into the Danube river could not be answered.

Different suggestions were broached, including a canal that would run parallel to the Danube, with which the Donau-Oder-Kanal would connect, or connecting the canal with the Alte Donau. Connecting the canal directly with the Danube would only have been possible in Langenzersdorf or Mannswörth near Schwechat, because these were the only points where the riverbed was dredged on the left-hand (eastern) side of the river.

The Reichsverkehrsministerium resolved that the Oder-Donau-Kanal should empty in Lobau at river kilometre 1916.4, and commissioned the construction of the first harbour basin at the mouth of the canal.

Work on the harbour basin and the entrance to the harbour - which was intended to form the mouth of the canal - began on 19 December 1939. It is to be assumed that forced laboureres, presumably Jewish Hungarians and Ukrainians, were employed for the construction of the canal and the oil harbour as well. It was expected that the first ships would be able to use the harbour in spring 1942. The later expansion of the harbour, which was due to take place after the end of the war, was to fit out the harbour with a total of seven basins, the first of which was to be used during the transport of crude oil from Romania to the north. Oil from Zistersdorf in the Weinviertel (Lower Austria) was to continue being processed by the Ostmärkischen Mineralölwerken in Austria. The oil storage facility was not relocated from the unenclosed river harbour to this new harbour because it would have created longer transport routes on land.

Besides oil and oil-based products, it was expected that the harbour in Lobau would also serve as a loading bay for coal.

=== Projects (1938 – 1945) ===
In his document, harbourmaster Broschek detailed not only the start of work on the Donau-Oder-Kanal and the beginnings of both of the new harbours on the Danube in Vienna, which were limited to an absolute minimum because of the war and which were due to be expanded after the final victory, but he also listed two further possible projects. These were still quite vague and only preliminary deliberations about them had taken place.

- A harbour in Groß-Enzersdorf

There were proposals to build a harbour near Groß-Enzersdorf in the area from kilometre 8 to kilometre 10 of the Donau-Oder-Kanal. This would have made it possible to settle industries that required a connection to the canal network in the area.

It was estimated that 3 million square metres of land were available for this project, but these plans were dependent on the flight paths for the proposed airport near Aderklaa.

- A harbour in Fischamend

The Donaudampfschiffahrtsgesellschaft had already made use of the mouth of the Fischa River near Fischamend as a harbour; the company had even been against the construction of a winter harbour at first, but later changed its position and lobbied for the construction of the harbour in Freudenau.

The river bank at the mouth of the Fischa is however steep and can be as much as 30 metres tall, which made the site inappropriate for a freight harbour. Nonetheless, Broschek records that an unnamed section of the army was looking for a site for a storage facility, for which the Fischa might have been appropriate.

Probably as a result of the later course of the war, the unnamed section of the army lost interest in the plans and they were thus not pursued further.

== Second Republic ==
After World War II, the harbours in Albern and Lobau became property of the City of Vienna.

Because the area along the Danube Canal had been particularly badly damaged in the Vienna Offensive in 1945, a town planning competition was organised in 1946 to reshape the area.

Architect Egon Friedinger's proposal envisaged the removal of the partly destroyed barracks in Roßau and the construction of a city museum in their stead. A harbour was also envisaged in this area.

The town planning authority's general plan for the development of Vienna's harbour facilities was approved on 1 March 1949 by the city senate. The first stage of this plan was the upgrading of the winter harbour in Freudenau to a container terminal. On 12 July 1949, the city senate decreed a temporary ban on construction in the areas around the natural landing sites on the Danube, the Danube Canal, the quay in the first and second districts, the harbours in Albern and Lobau and for the regulation of the Schwechat River in connection with the Donau-Oder-Kanal and the Donau-Adria-Kanal in Vienna.

On 27 October 1953, the Vienna City Council resolved to restore the last remaining 300 metres of the heavily damaged embankment in front of the harbour in Freudenau. This was expected to cost some 450.000 schilling (around 32.700 Euro).

The Freudenauer Hafenbrücke, which crosses both the Danube Canal and the entrance to the harbour, was opened by mayor Franz Jonas on 13 December 1938. This bridge shortened the land route to the harbour in Albern, which until then had only been accessible via the Rotundenbrücke.

In 1962/63, the Wiener Hafenbetriebsgesellschaft m.b.H., a private company, was founded to operate the harbours in Freudenau, Albern and Lobau. In 1978/79, the company merged with the Wiener Städtischen Lager- und Kühlhausgesellschaft m.b.H., which ran the city's warehouse and refrigeration facilities.

In 1979, a new legal arrangement created the following bodies:

- WHG (Wiener Hafen Gesellschaft m.b.H.) ("Vienna Harbour Society")
- WHV (Wiener Hafen und Lager Ausbau- und Vermögensverwaltungsgesellschaft m.b.H.) ("Vienna Harbour and Warehouse Expansion and Financial Administration Society")
- WHL (Wiener Hafen Lager- und Umschlagsbetriebe Ges.m.b.H) ("Vienna Harbour Warehouse and Loading Businesses")

In 1983, the WHL received the right to use the Austrian coat of arms in its business dealings. This is an honour that the Austrian minister for the economy can award companies that have made exceptional contributions to the Austrian economy.

The harbour in Freudenau was decreed a free port in 1965; in 1977, plans were drawn up to expand the harbour further.

On 21 September 2006, the BioDiesel Vienna GmbH opened one of Europe's largest and most modern biodiesel-facilities in the harbour in Lobau. 95,000 tonnes of biodiesel are expected to be produced here.

A biomass power plant in Simmering is for its part provisioned with woodchips via the harbour in Albern.

The automobile terminal in the winter harbour boasts a carwash capable of washing 12 cars per hour, an unpacking facility with a capacity of 20 cars per hour and space for around 5000 vehicles. In 2005, approximately 77,000 personal cars were imported via the harbour in Freudenau, or around one in three of all new vehicles sold in Austria.

== Literature ==
- Donau-Regulierungs-Kommission in Wien (Herausgeber): „Der Freudenauer Hafen in Wien - Denkschrift zur Eröffnung des Freudenauer Hafens am 28. Oktober 1902“, k.k. Hof- und Staatsdruckerei, Wien 1902 (in German)
- Baudirektion der niederösterreichischen Donau-Regulierungs-Kommission: „Die Schiffahrtsstraßen und Hafenanlagen bei Wien“, Selbstverlag, Wien 1920 (in German)
- Ludwig Brandl: „Österr.Monatsschrift für den öffentlichen Baudienst und das Berg- und Hüttenwesen.“ Jg. 1923,11.12., Artikel: „Die Ausgestaltung der Hafenanlagen in Wien“ (in German)
- Martin Schmid: Stadt am Fluss: Wiener Häfen als sozio-naturale Schauplätze von der Frühen Neuzeit bis nach dem Zweiten Weltkrieg. In: Lukas Morscher, Martin Scheutz, Walter Schuster (Hg.): Orte der Stadt im Wandel vom Mittelalter zur Gegenwart: Treffpunkte, Verkehr und Fürsorge (= Beiträge zur Geschichte der Städte Mitteleuropas 24). Innsbrucker Studienverlag 2013(in German)
- Christine Klusacek, Kurt Stimmer: „Die Stadt und der Strom - Wien und die Donau“, DACHS Verlagsges.m.b.H., Wien, ISBN 3-85058-113-6 (in German)
