= Nussdorf weir and lock =

Hydraulic engineering works in Nussdorf, Vienna, Austria

Coordinates: 48°15′33″N 16°22′09″E

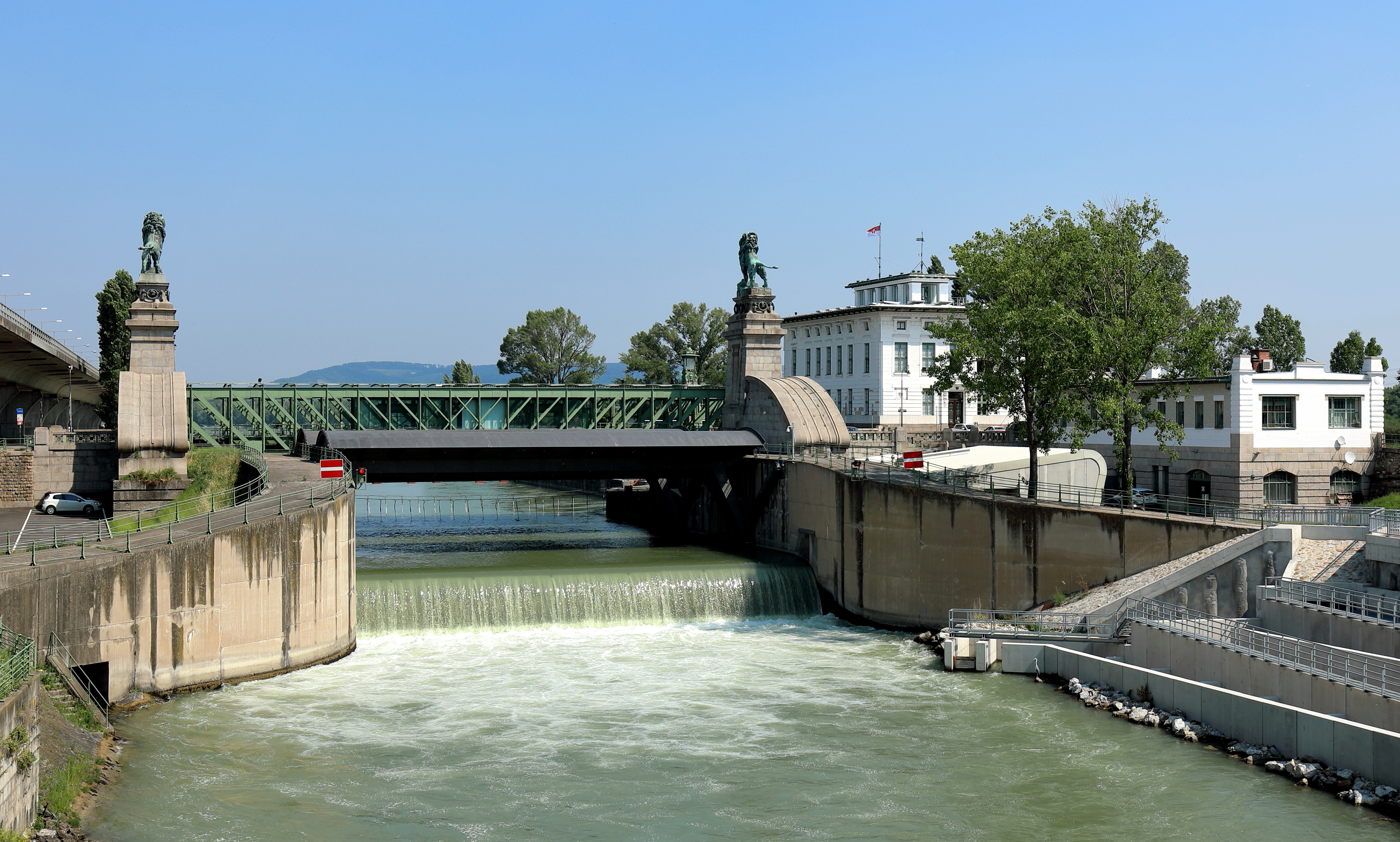
The Nussdorf weir, administration building and the Schemerlbrücke

The Nussdorf weir and lock are works of hydraulic engineering located in the Viennese suburb of Nussdorf at the point where the Donaukanal leaves the Danube. Designed by Austrian architect Otto Wagner, The weir and lock were built following the adoption of a new law in July 1892, which also authorised the construction of the Vienna Stadtbahn and the transformation of the Donaukanal into a winter harbour.

The weir and lock in Nussdorf are commonly confused with one another, although they are actually two separate constructions built to serve the same purpose.

== Location ==
The weir and lock are located behind the Nussdorf station on the Franz-Josefs-Bahn. Although they are named after a suburb in the 19th district of Vienna, Döbling, they actually fall within the jurisdiction of the 20th district, Brigittenau.

== Earlier constructions ==
Before the construction of the weir and lock in Nussdorf, the Donaukanal was protected from floating ice and to a large extent also from flooding by the Wilhelm von Engerth’s floating barrier, the Schwimmtor. The Schwimmtor remained in service until World War I and was finally scrapped in 1945.

== The weir and lock in Nussdorf ==
The weir and lock in Nussdorf and the Kaiserbadwehr (another weir) were the only hydraulic engineering works that were ever realised as part of the plan to create a harbour in the Donaukanal. Two further weir and lock arrangements had been envisaged near the Ostbahnbrücke and directly before the harbour in Freudenau.

The construction of the weir and lock was necessary to protect the new developments on the canal (the metropolitan railway, the tributary canals and later the harbour and ships) from floods and ice, but also to maintain sufficient water in the canal so that ships could pass. Wilhelm von Engerth's Schwimmtor provided satisfactory protection from floating ice, but it only gave a very limited degree of control over the amount of water in the canal. In particular because of the need to protect the tributary canals built along the Donaukanal, it was essential that the level of water in the canal did not rise by more than 80 centimetres.

=== Nussdorf weir ===
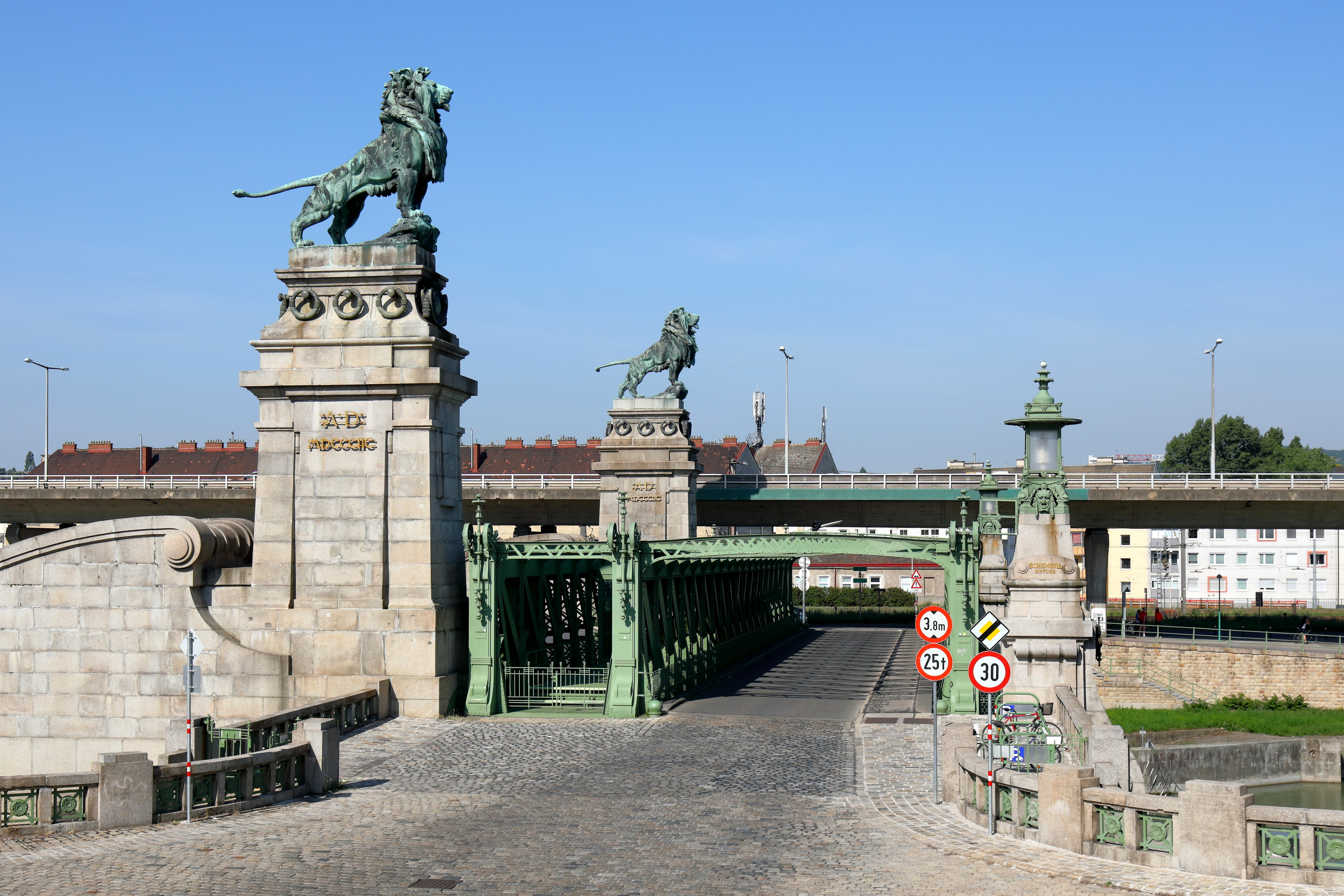
The lions on the Nussdorf weir

The Nussdorf weir was built between August 1894 and 1899. The walls were finished in 1897 and the steel construction was mounted by August 1898. The administration building and the chain magazine followed in 1899. Otto Wagner was employed by the transport commission for the project; the architectural plans for the weir and the Schemerlbrücke, the adjoining buildings and (possibly) the lock are the work of Sigmund Taussig. Because of the site's highly visible location – at the point at which the Donaukanal leads away from the Danube towards the centre of Vienna – Otto Wagner considered the weir (technically a needle dam but also a bridge weir) as the gate to the city and thus designed it to be particularly impressive. It features imposing columns topped with lions made of bronze. These lions are the work of Rudolf Weyr and were later the model for the logo of Gräf & Stift, an Austrian automobile producer.

The weir passed its first test in 1899, when the land on the Donaukanal was successfully protected from flooding.

The needle dam was replaced with a modern segment weir during improvements carried out on Vienna's defenses against flooding between 1971 and 1975. The new weir featured barriers that could be lowered to the bottom of the canal. Between 2004 and 2005, the Nussdorf power station was built downstream of the weir and lock without any visible changes to the historical appearance of the area. The power station's 12 turbines produce around 28 gigawatt hours per year and thus provide electricity for approximately 10,000 households.

=== Schemerlbrücke ===
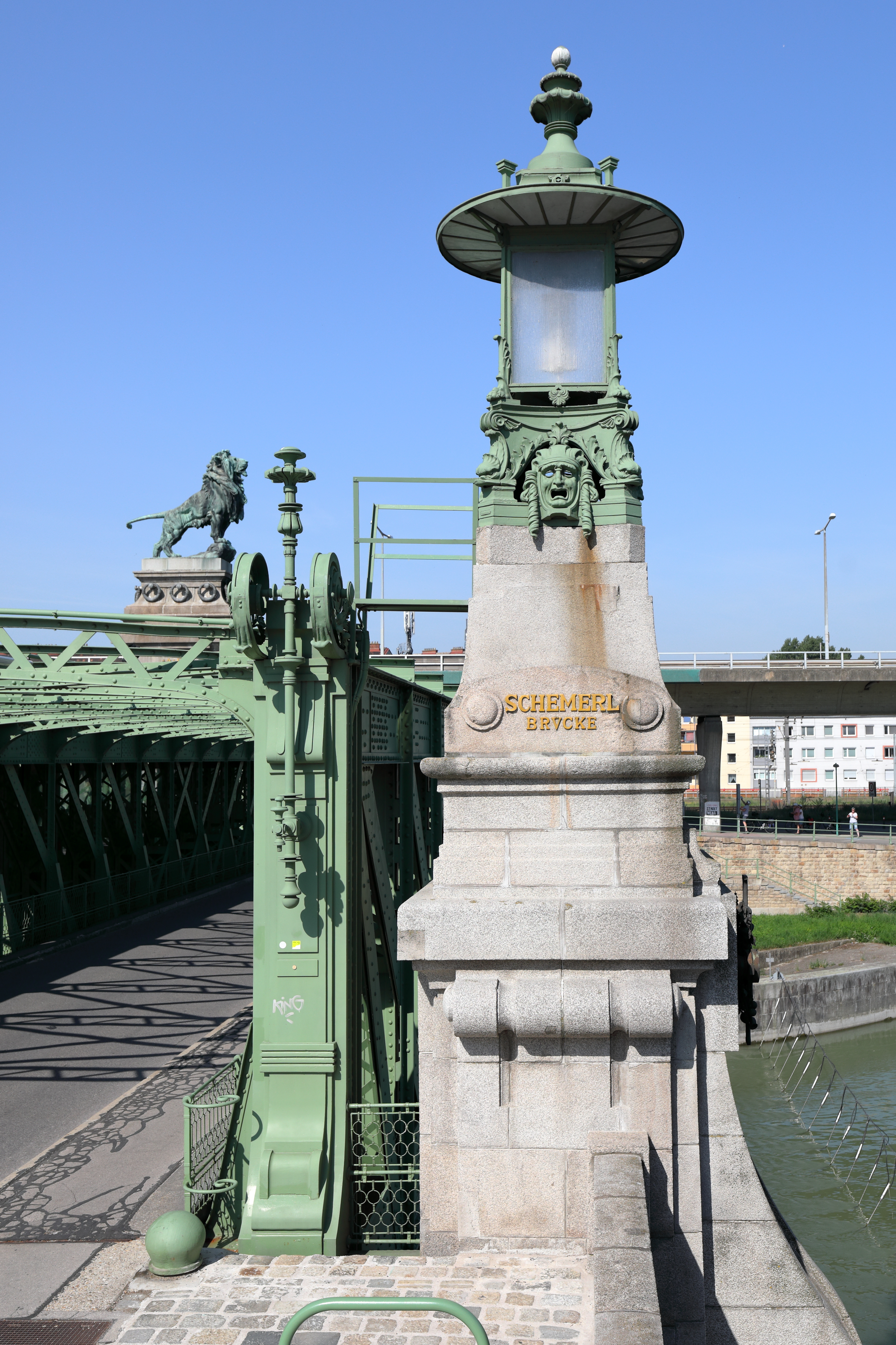
Pillar with an inscription of the name of the Schemerlbrücke and topped with a lantern

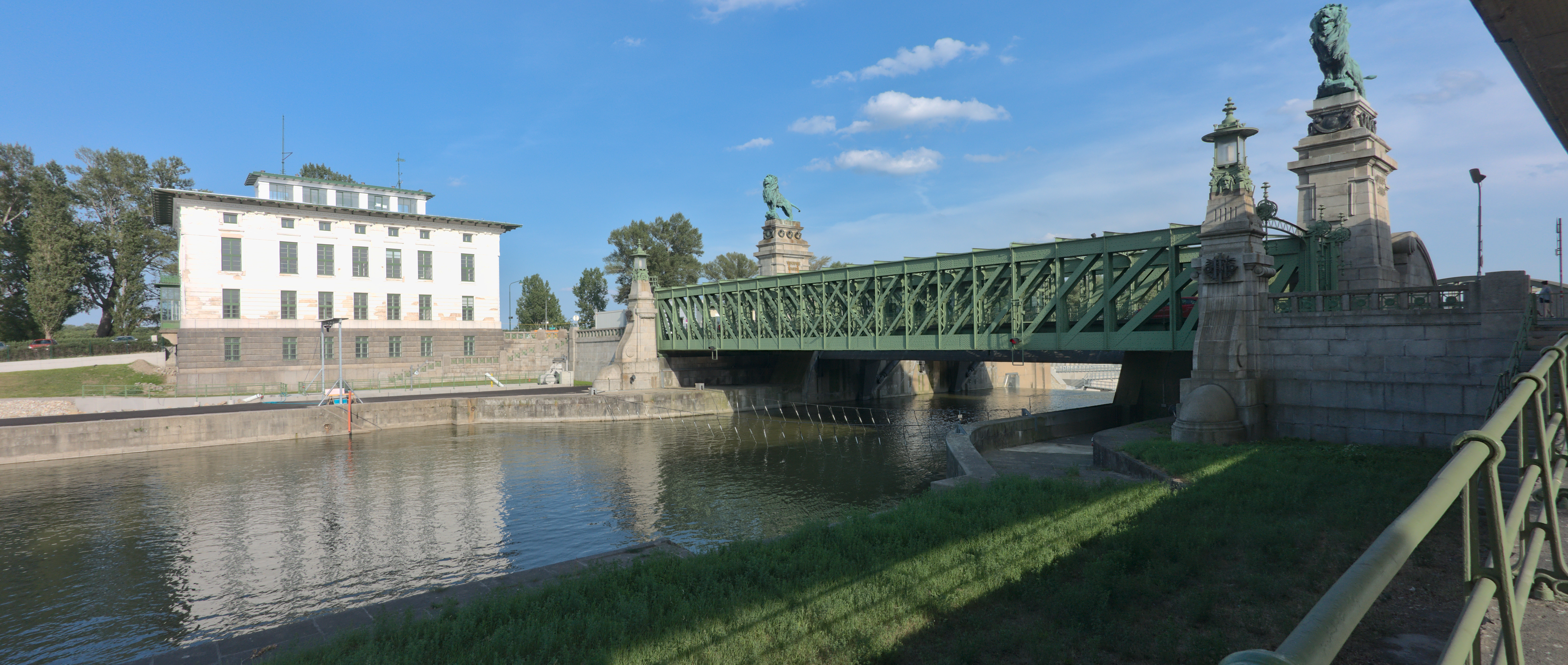
Administration building and Schemerlbrücke

The Schemerlbrücke ("Schemerl bridge"), also known as Löwenbrücke ("lions bridge"), is named after Josef Schemerl Ritter von Leytenbach, k. k. Hofrat and Hofbauratsdirektor, who developed the first plans to regulate the Danube in 1810. His plans were not realised. He died in 1844.

The bridge is referred to using a range of variations of its name:

- In the Landesgesetzblatt Nummer 34/1996 (an official publication), in which the new border between the 19th and 20th districts was laid down, reference is made to the bridge as the “Josef-von-Schemmerl-Brücke”.
- According to the “Amtliches Wiener Straßenverzeichnis – 16. aktualisierte Auflage” (the official directory of Vienna's streets), the bridge appears as the “Schemmerlbrücke”.
- The inscription on one of the pylons refers to it as the “Schemerlbrücke”.
- Different maps of the city of Vienna name the bridge either “Josef von Schemerl-Brücke” or “Schemerlbrücke”.
- The book “Querungen. Brücken - Stadt – Wien” (Crossings. Bridges – City – Vienna) published by the administrative department of the City of Vienna with responsibility for the city's bridges (Magistratsabteilung 29) contains a list of Vienna's bridges which uses the name “Schemerlbrücke”. It thus seems that this is the correct name.

The truss bridge was built between 1894 and 1898. Its span measures 49 metres, arching over both the 40-metre wide canal and the 9-metre wide towpath. The construction of the bridge was made necessary for structural reasons; the three main bearing walls and the strong horizontal bar support both the weight of the bridge and the pressure created by the damming of the water in the canal (the weir is also referred to as a bridge weir as a result). The Schemmerlbrücke was however also needed for the weir machinery.

In April 1945, the Schemmerlbrücke, along with the other bridges over the Donaukanal, was intentionally rendered unusable. In 1947, a wooden structure was built which made it possible for pedestrians to cross the canal. Between 1953 and 1955, the bridge was repaired and in 1978 it was thoroughly restored.

=== Nussdorf lock ===
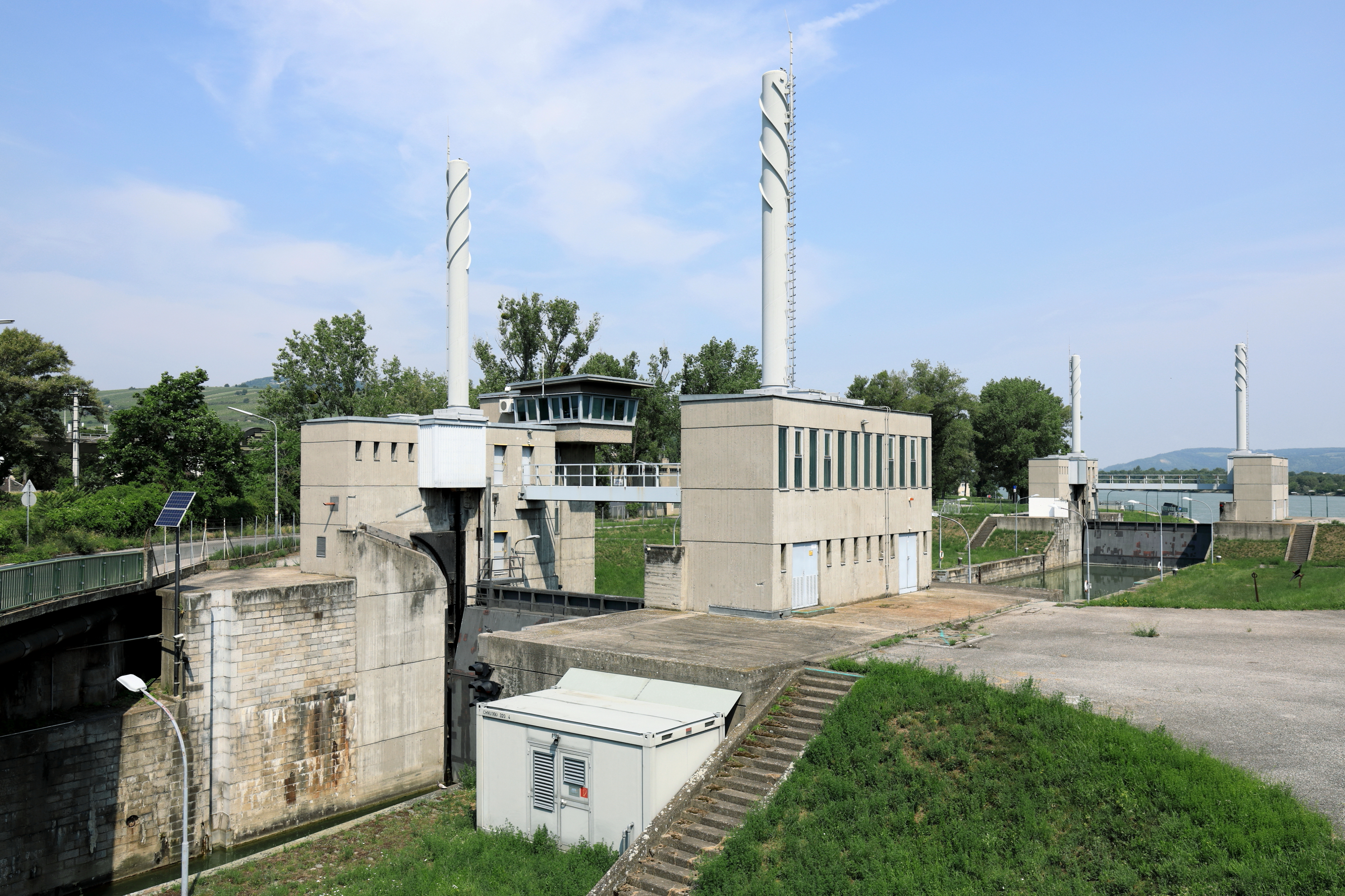
The Nussdorf lock

In contrast to the Nussdorf weir, the Nussdorf lock is not very well known. Construction on the lock also began in August 1894. The chamber lock is 85 metres long and 15 metres wide, but at the same time, a canal 20 metres wide, 3.5 metres deep and with an embankment slope of 1:2 1/2 had to be built to make it possible to use the lock. This canal made it necessary to build two railway bridges for the Donauuferbahn as well as a road bridge between Nussdorf and Handelskai. It is not known for sure whether this lock was also designed by Otto Wagner, how it survived World War II, and why it was renovated between 1964 and 1966. Presumably, it was too small for modern ships and its technical features needed updating. On 25 November 1966, the City of Vienna announced that the Stadtrat Kurt Heller had officially opened the fully mechanised lock.

To ensure that sufficient water was available for the lock even when the surrounding canals are blocked with ice, a tributary canal was also built.

=== Administration building ===
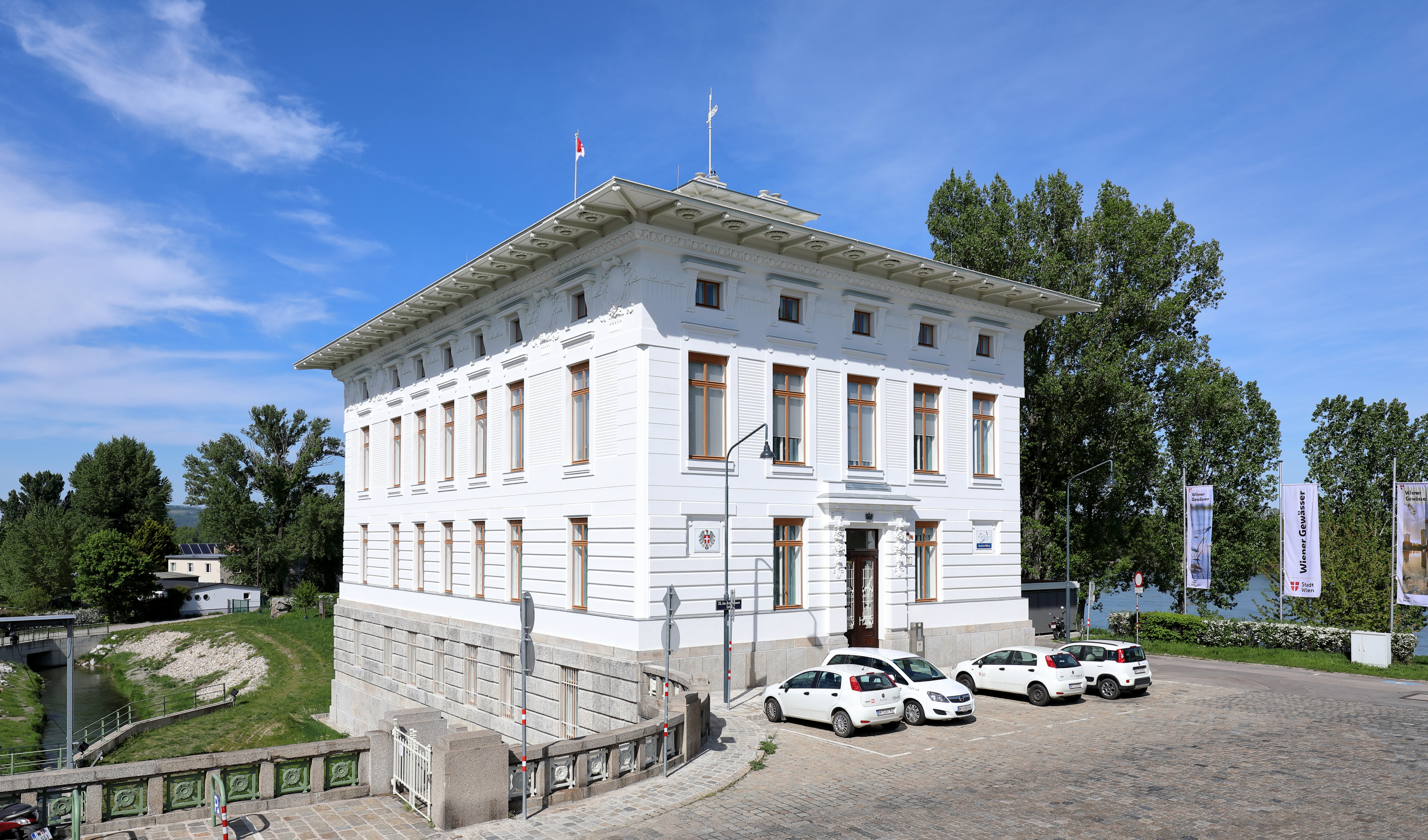
The administration building of the Nussdorf weir and lock, today the seat of the via donau

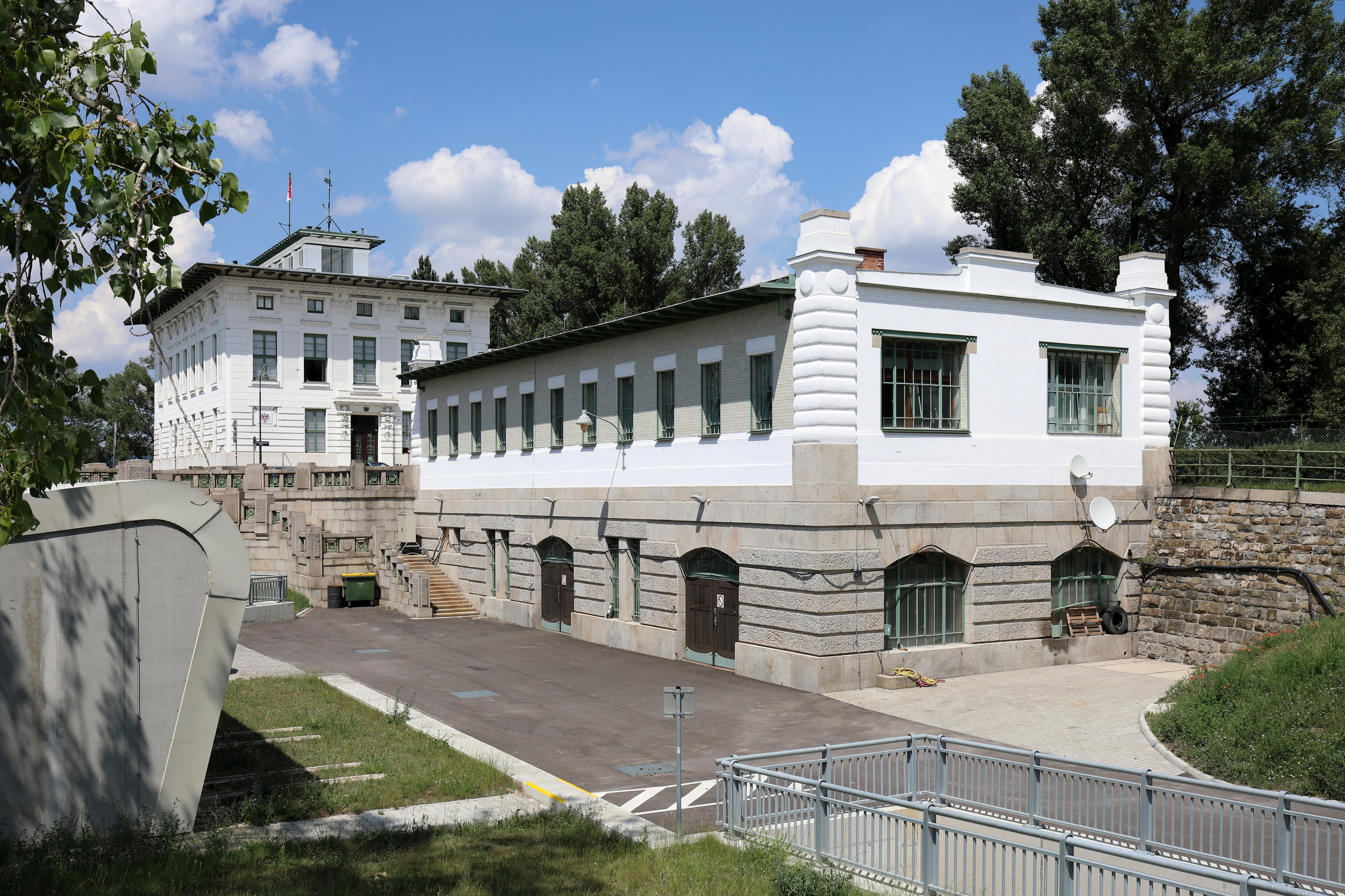
The Nussdorf weir and lock chain magazine

The three- to four-storey administration building that stands near the weir and lock was designed by Otto Wagner and built in secessionist style. The building's roof features a platform that served as an observation post.

=== Chain magazine ===
The chain magazine is located to the south of the administration building and is a one- to two-storey building.
