= Engerth =

Engerth may refer to:-

People

- Wilhelm Freiherr von Engerth (1814-1884), an Austrian engineer.
- Edouard von Engerth, a nineteenth-century Austrian artist.

Transportation

- Engerth locomotive, an early form of articulated locomotive, invented by Wilhelm Freiherr von Engerth (see above).
