= Twin City Liner =

The Twin City Liner is a catamaran service on the Danube river between Vienna, Austria and Bratislava, Slovakia, operating since 1 June 2006. The journey between the two capitals takes approximately 75 minutes.

== History ==
=== Original vessel ===
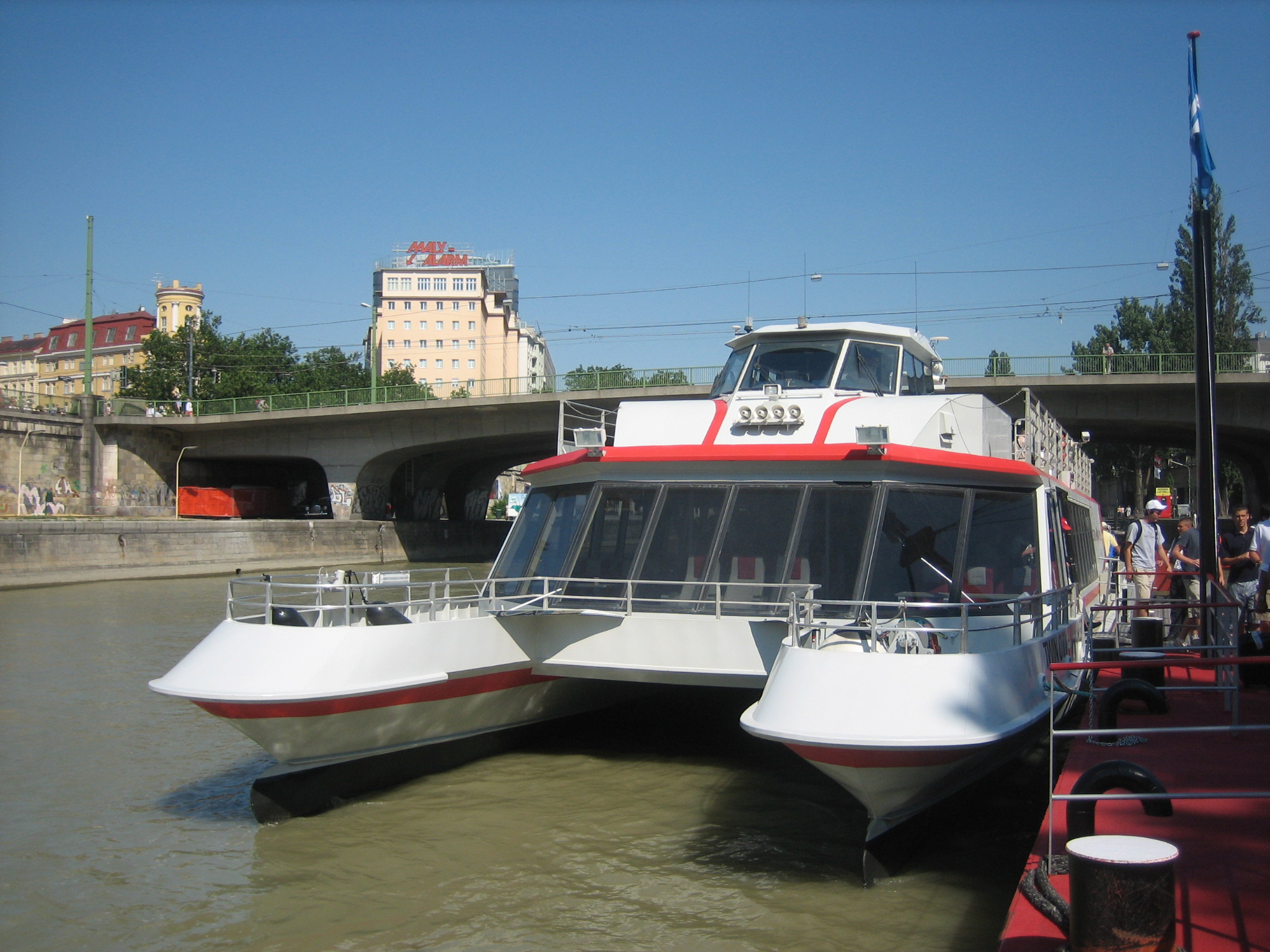
- Twin City Liner 1 in Vienna, 2006

History
- Name: Twin City Liner 1
- Launched: 2006
- Identification: Call sign: PA5116; MMSI number: 244316099

General characteristics
- Type: Passenger catamaran
- Length: 32.9 m (overall)

The first catamaran was built in Norway between the autumn of 2005 and the spring of 2006. The delivery route was across Skagerrak, on the North Sea, followed by the Rhine–Main–Danube Canal to Vienna. The Norwegian shipyard Båtservice Mandal developed a high speed aluminium catamaran with a hydrojet which can also be used in summer at low tide. The draught guaranteed by the contract is 80 cm. To minimize the impact of the waves, complex model tests were performed by the Austrian Institute for Maritime Technology (Schiffbautechnische Versuchsanstalt). The catamaran is totally climate-controlled, and can accommodate 106 passengers and crew (a captain, two sailors and catering staff).

On 14 May 2007 the Twin City Liner failed in Vienna, in the district of Erdberg, on the right bank of the Danube Canal and had to be rescued by firemen from Vienna. After repair and administrative authorization, it was returned to service. A similar accident occurred on 28 July 2009, when the captain tried to avoid a floating tree trunk near the gateway Erdberg.

=== Second vessel ===
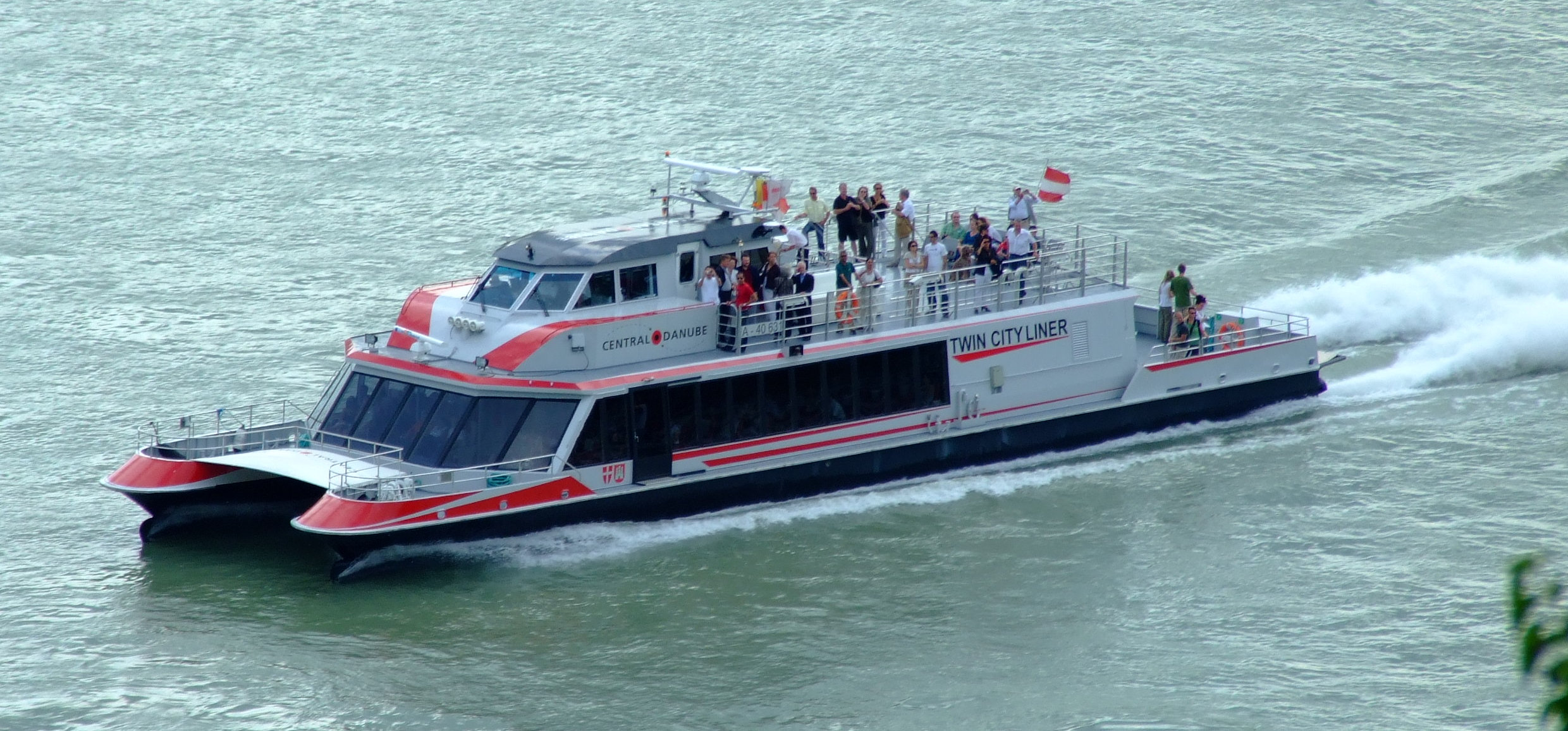
- Twin City Liner 2 in Devín, 2008

History
- Name: Twin City Liner 2
- Launched: 2008
- Identification: Call sign: PF7444; MMSI number: 244095251

General characteristics
- Type: Passenger catamaran
- Length: 33 m (overall)

During a press conference on 20 August 2007 the Deputy Mayor for Economic Affairs and Finance Vienna Renate Brauner discussed the acquisition of the second Twin City Liner. This second "Twinni", as nicknamed by the media, was also built by Båtservice Mandal and made the same journey.

On 13 May 2008 the Twin City Liner 2 docked in the central port of Vienna below Reichsbrücke. The maiden voyage of the new catamaran, with the registration number A-40631, was conducted immediately after its christening by Austrian president Heinz Fischer and his wife Margit Fischer, and the priest of the Cathedral of Vienna Anton Faber, as part of a state visit to Bratislava. During a stopover in Devín, Slovak President Ivan Gasparovic and his wife boarded the ship and then continued the journey.

Besides minor changes to the technical equipment and form, the new Twin City Liner can accommodate up to 126 passengers: 106 seats forward in the passenger cabin, eight seats in the "VIP" cabin on the upper deck and twelve outdoor seats for travel during the summer. The commercial operation of the second Twin City Liner began 31 August 2008.

There have been studies conducted for the purchase of a third vessel to develop a fast connection based on the Twin City Liner to Budapest or Belgrade. Trial services to Budapest have been operated for special events.

=== Replacement vessel ===
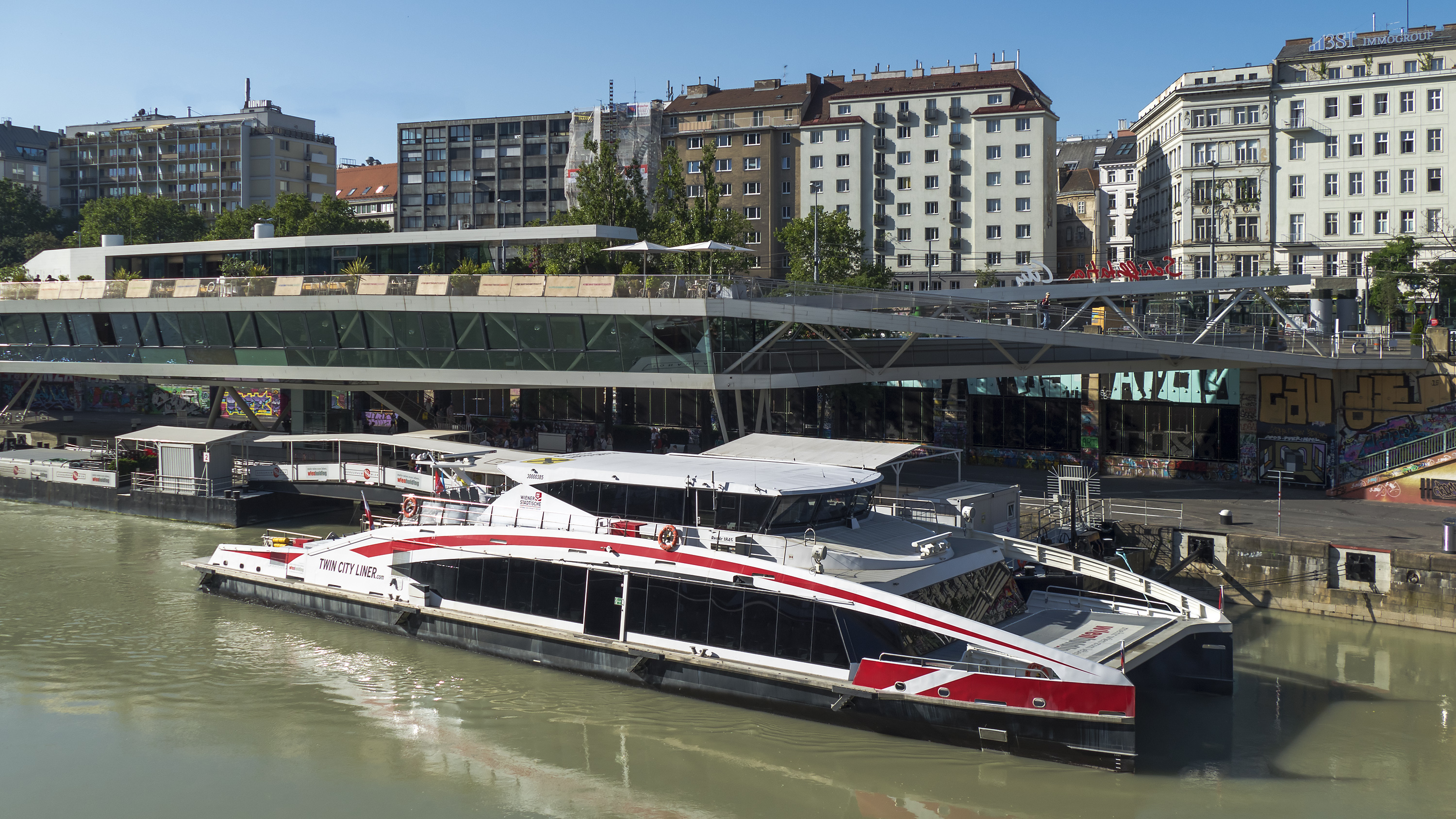
- Second generation Twin City Liner in Vienna, 2019

History
- Name: Twin City Liner
- Port of registry: Vienna, Austria
- Builder: Wight Shipyard
- Launched: 2019
- Identification: Call sign: OED3085; MMSI number: 203999485

General characteristics
- Type: Passenger catamaran
- Length: 39.99 m (overall); 38.1 m (waterline)
- Beam: 11.40 metres
- Draught: 0.8 metres

In January 2019, it was announced that a new, larger Twin City Liner would begin operating on 29 March 2019. This Twin City Liner was built in England by Wight Shipyard. It took 62,000 working hours, 25 tons of aluminium, and 60 square meters of window glass to complete the 7 million euro vessel. It is powered by four Di16 V8 Scania 4400BHP Ehardt engines, and four Kamewa Rolls-Royce jets.

== Route and timetables ==
Unlike most other ships sailing on the Danube, the Twin City Liner does not depart from the port of Reichsbrücke, but the station in the city centre, on the Danube canal between Schwedenplatz and Marienbrücke (Vienna) to bypass the dam of the power plant Freudenau. In July 2010, a new wharf was opened.

The ships sail from May to September four to five times a day in each direction, and in April and October, three to four times. Besides the planned operating hours (evenings and from mid - December to April), ships can be chartered.

== Owner ==
The ship owner is the Central Danube Region Marketing & Development GmbH, a 50:50 joint venture of Wien Holding (owned by the city of Vienna), and Raiffeisenlandesbank Niederösterreich-Wien.

== Image gallery ==
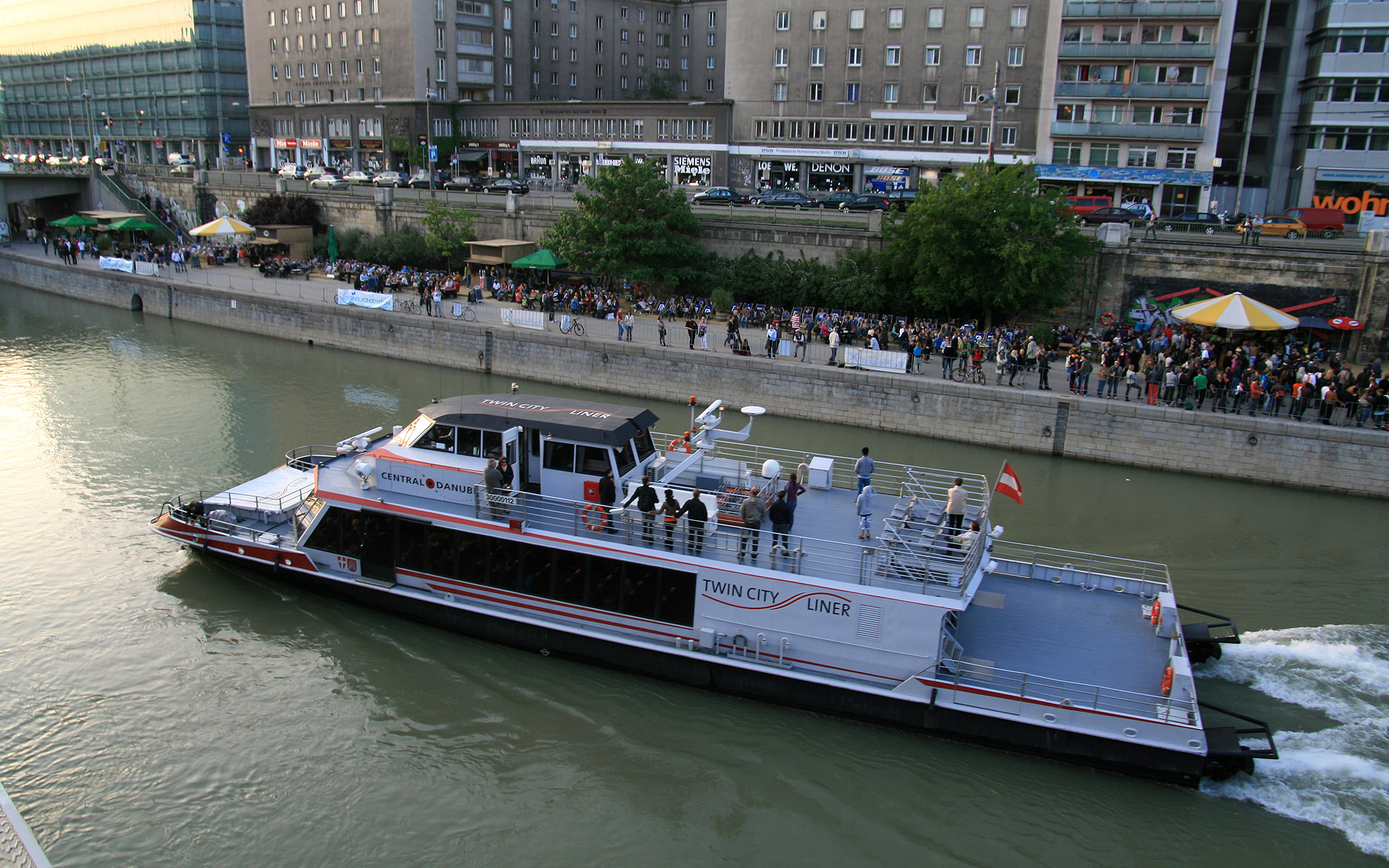
The Twin City Liner in Vienna

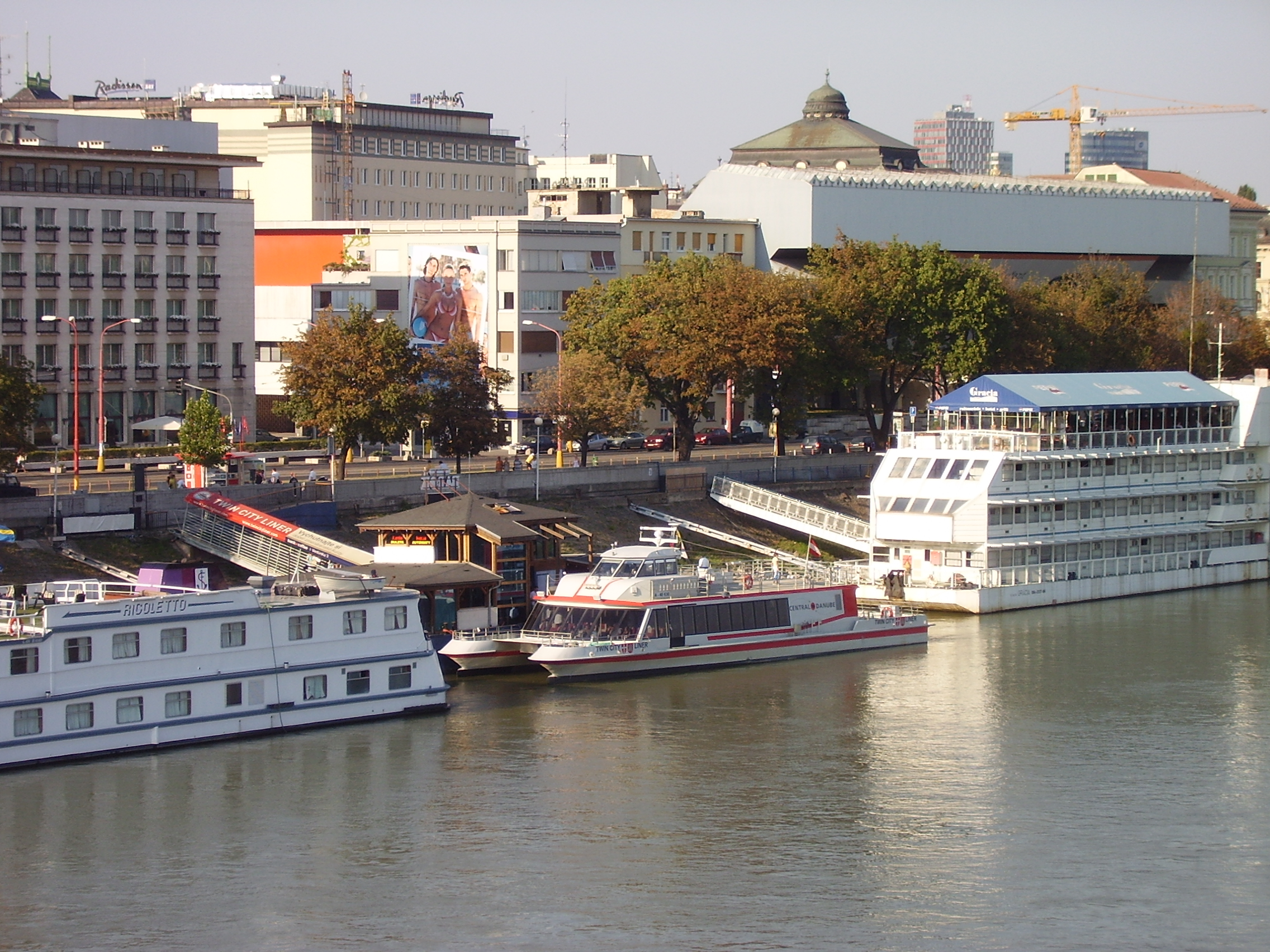
The Twin City Liner in Bratislava

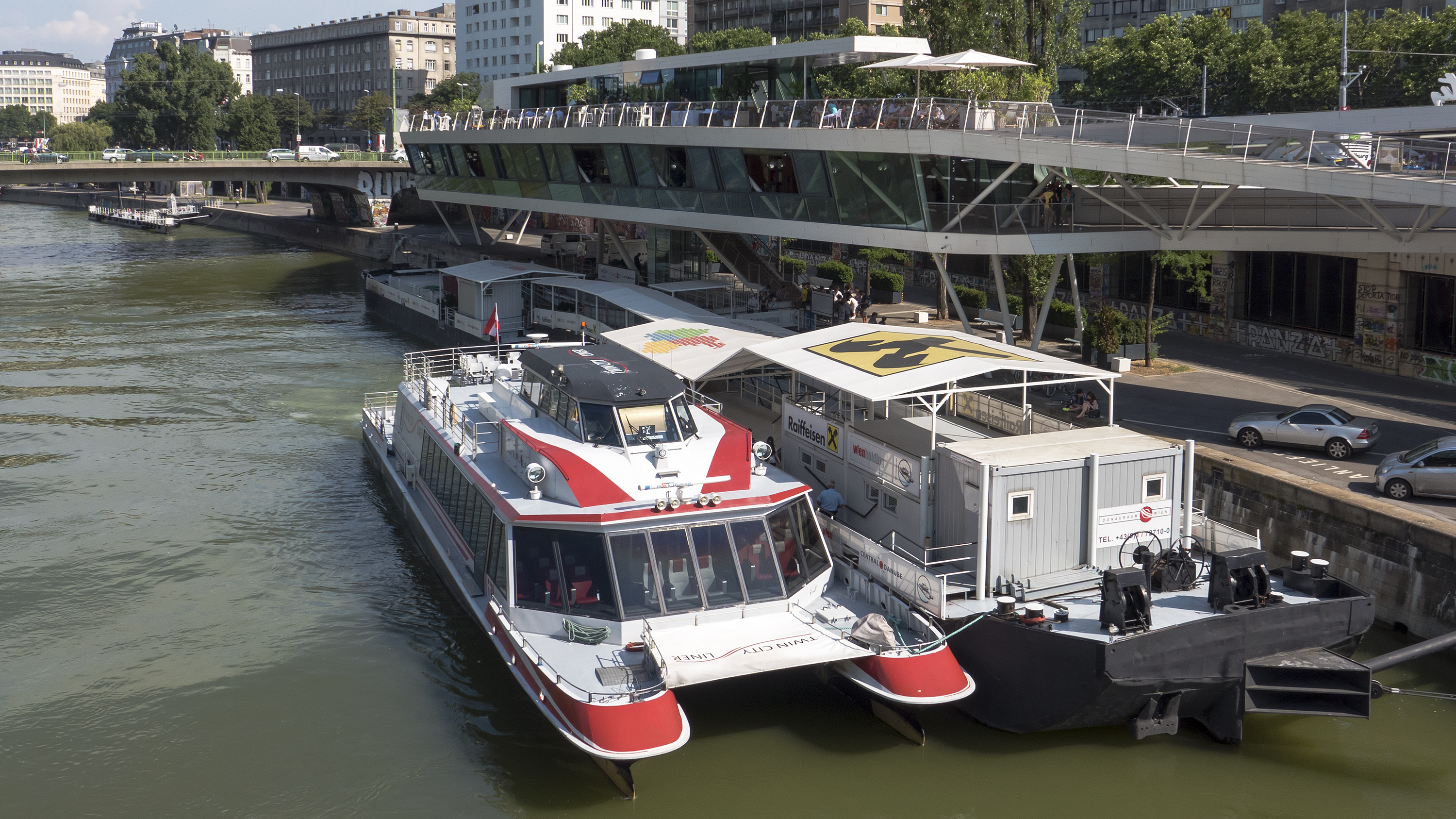
Twin City Liner at Schwedenplatz

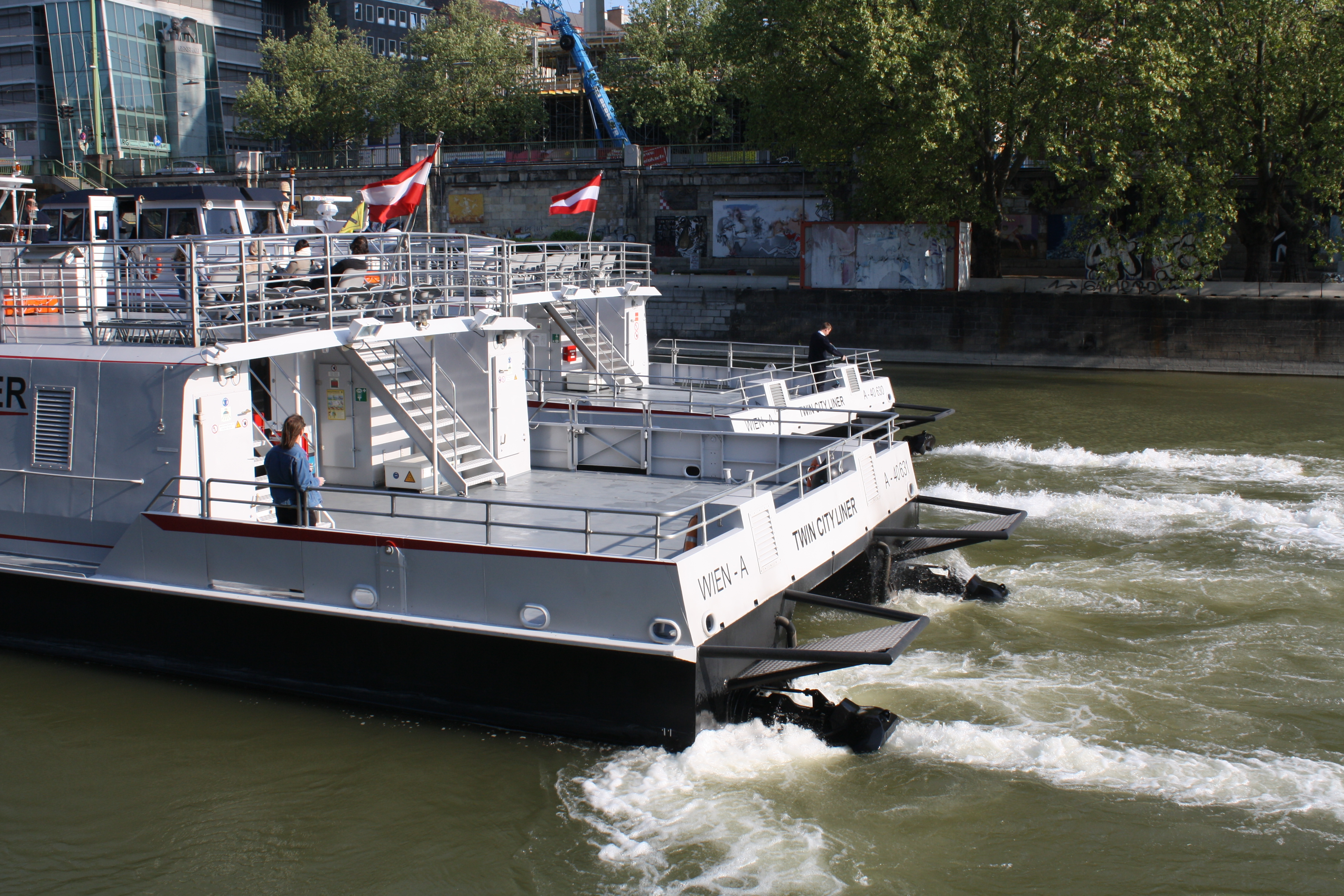
Side view
