= Augartenbrücke =

Bridge in Vienna

Coordinates: 48°13′08″N 16°22′13″E

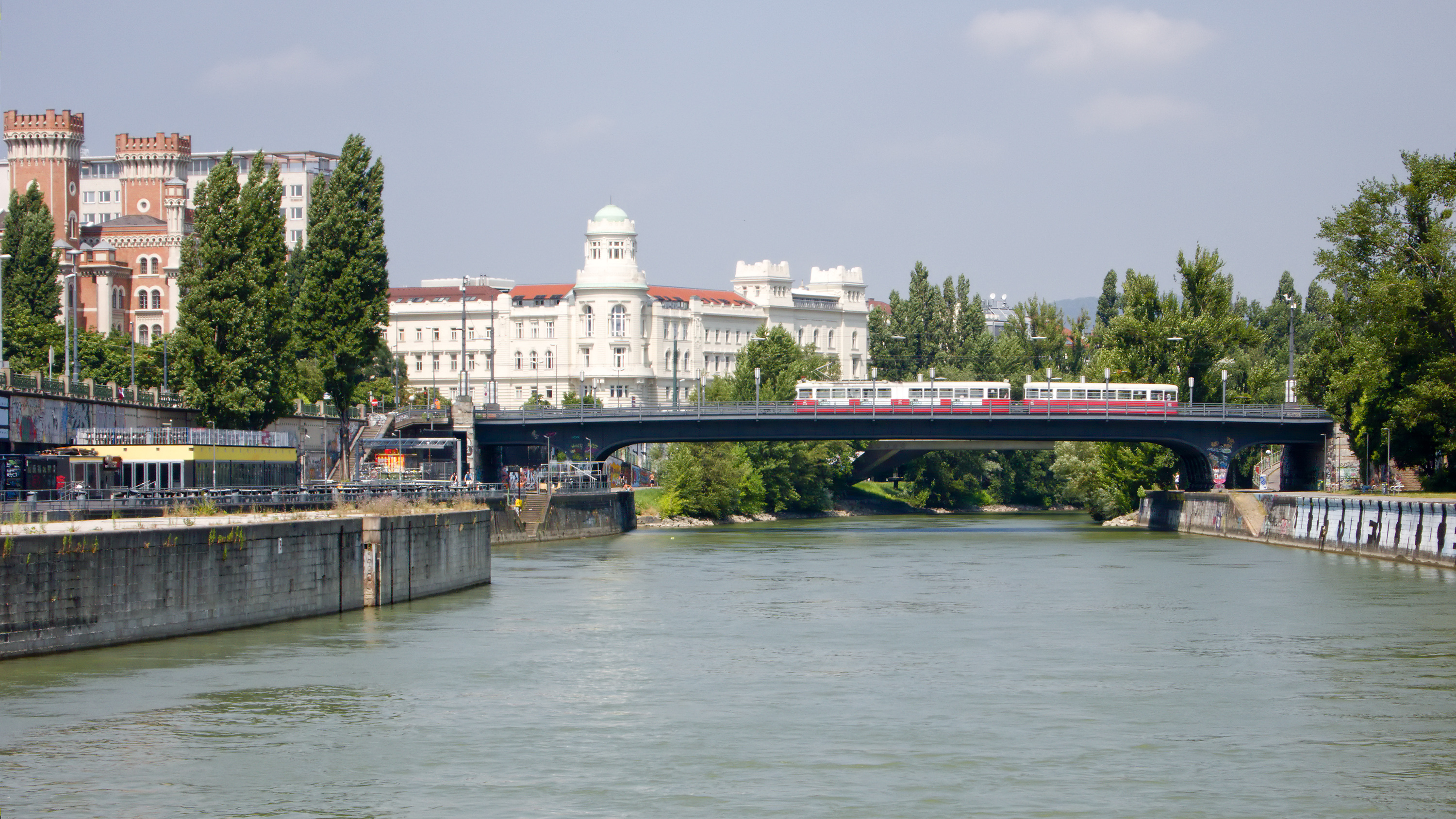
The Augartenbrücke from the southeast; at left, the Rossauer Barracks in the 9th district.

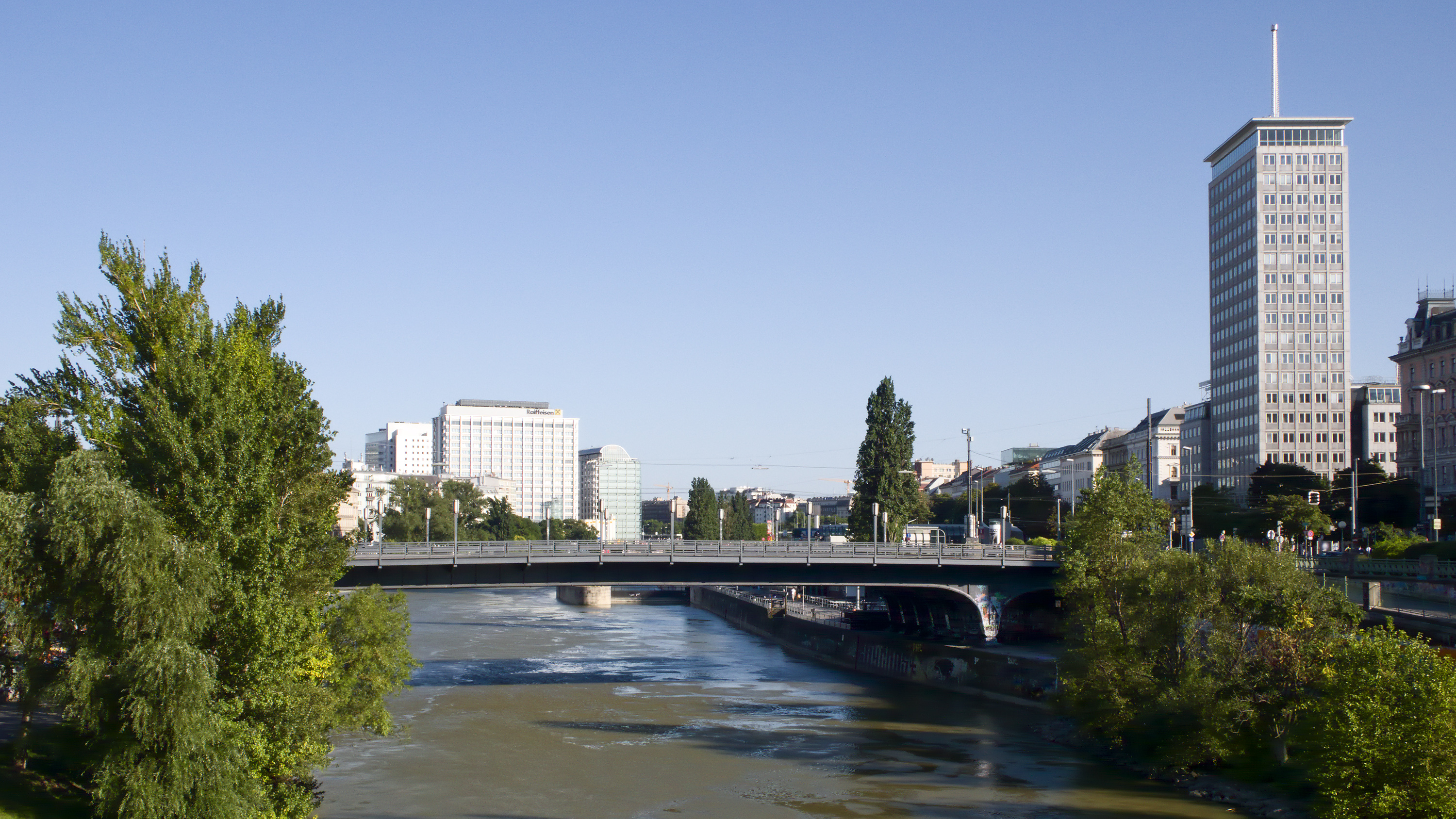
The Augartenbrücke from the northwest; at right the 1st district with the Ringturm.

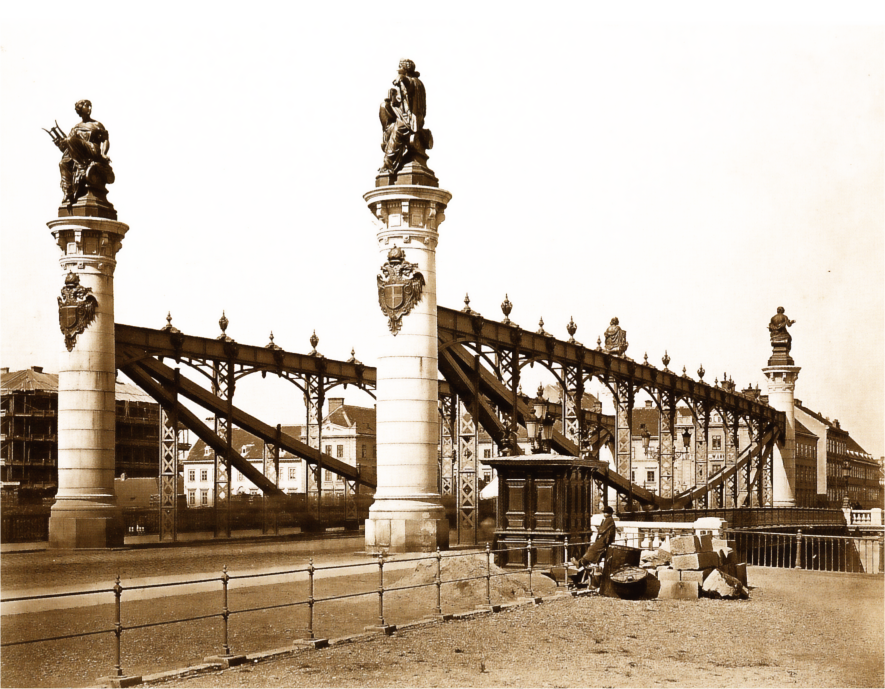
The opening of the new Augartenbrücke in 1873.

The Augartenbrücke is a bridge that crosses the Donaukanal in Vienna, which connects the 9th district (Alsergrund) and the 1st district (Innere Stadt) on the southwest side of the canal with the 2nd district, Leopoldstadt, on the northeast side. There has been a bridge on the site since 1782.

== Location ==
The Augartenbrücke connects Maria-Theresien-Straße (at the boundary between the 1st and 9th districts) with Lower Augartenstraße in the 2nd district. This is a one-way road, running towards the 2nd district (a parallel route in the opposite direction crosses the Rossauer Brücke to the northwest). Due west of the bridge is the Rossauer Barracks, while the northernmost houses of the Franz-Josefs-Kais are located to the south of the bridge, just outside the Vienna Ring Road.

The centre of the bridge has lines of the Vienna tram service running in both directions. The northwest side of the bridge takes car traffic to the left, to the Upper Donaustraße, which runs along the side of the canal towards the Rossauer Brücke, while the southeast side of the bridge takes car traffic straight on onto Lower Augartenstraße. Line U4 of the Vienna U-Bahn runs underneath the bridge, replacing the line of the Vienna Stadtbahn opened in 1901.

== History ==
After Joseph II opened the Augarten to the general public, the Neue Gasse ("New Alley," modern Lower Augartenstraße) was created in 1775 and then it was linked to Rossau by a wooden bridge called the "New Bridge". In 1809 during the War of the Fifth Coalition, the "New Bridge" was burnt down for strategic reasons, but then rebuilt later in the same year. In 1829, a new bridge was built on the same site.

The current Augartenbrücke was erected in 1872/3 by the French compagnie de Fives-Lille using welded iron of Belgian origin, with a suspended frame and support chains, as well as a wooden deck. The official opening took place on 6 June 1873, during the Vienna World's Fair. The four granite pillars at each end of the bridge supported bronze allegorical figures of painting, poetry, industry, and astronomy.

Some sources claim that at this point the bridge was named Maria-Theresien-Brücke, but this must be incorrect. A newspaper report from the day after the bridge was opened says that the bridge had been given the name Augartenbrücke on 29 November 1872 by the city council under the direction of mayor Cajetan von Felder. Furthermore, the bridge appears as Augartenbrücke on the city maps of 1873, 1880, and 1890.

As time went on, the bridge was no longer capable of bearing the increased volume and weight of traffic and traffic restrictions had to be applied to it. In September 1927, the Vienna Building Authority, under director Franz Musil (1884-1966) decided that the Augartenbrücke would be replaced. In this matter, the possibility of shifting the Augartenbrücke from Maria-Theresien-Straße to the Schottenring was considered, but rejected for the sake of lorry traffic.

To make it possible to cross the Donaukanal during the building process, the building firm Waagner-Biro built a temporary bridge with the same capacity as the Friedensbrücke. This temporary bridge was opened to traffic in October 1928.

The Augartenbrücke was rebuilt between 1929 and 1931, following the design of Hubert Gessner. The bridge now received its characteristic lighting fixtures. The new bridge followed the same axis as the earlier bridge. It had four lanes for traffic, two tram tracks, and two footpaths. The new bridge was opened on 5 July 1931 by President Wilhelm Miklas and Minister for Commerce and Transport Eduard Heinl.

In the face of the Vienna Offensive of April 1945, the bridge was destroyed by the retreating German forces. However it was the first of the bridges over the Donaukanal to be restored after the Second World War and on 12 January 1946, it was again opened to traffic.

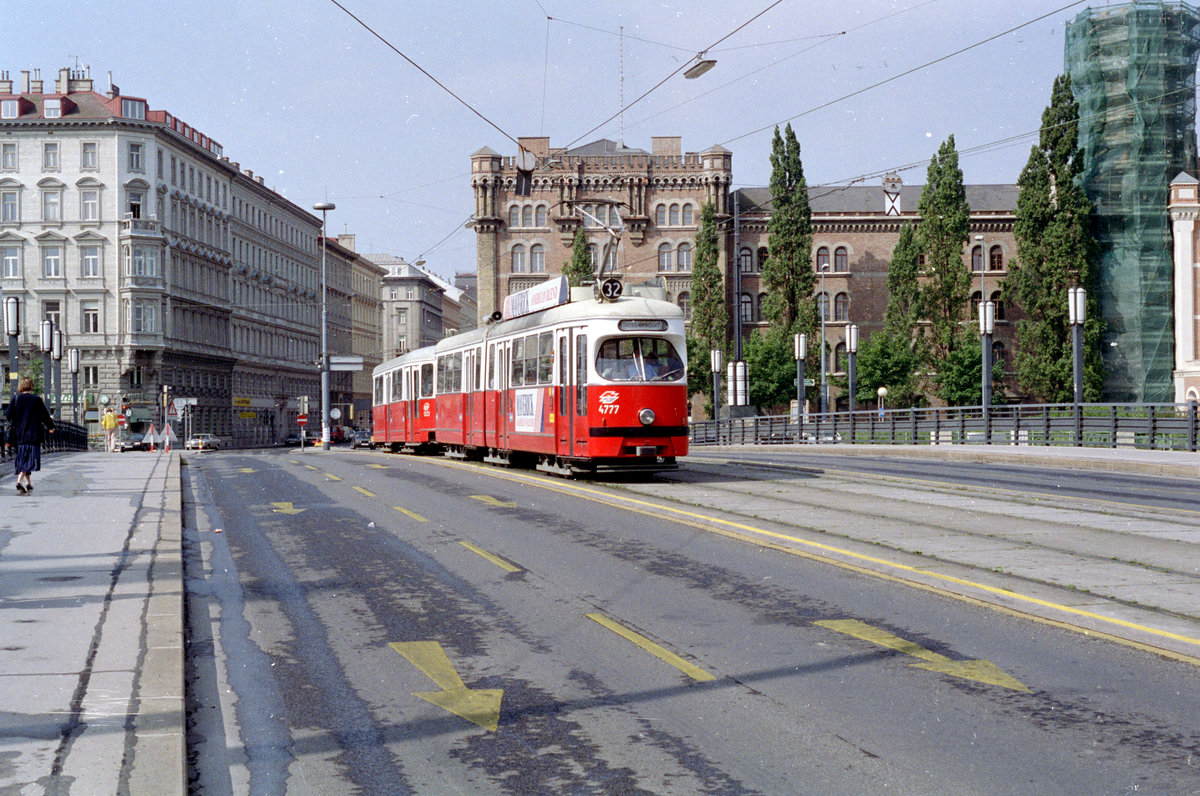
Line 32 tram on the Augartenbrücke (1992)

The bridge became part of the Vienna tram network in 1910, when the steam tram from Upper Donaustraße to Floridsdorf was replaced by an electric tram with its terminus at the Schottenring station (next to the Augartenbrücke). Line 331 to Stammersdorf and line 132 to Strebersdorf crossed the bridge (after 1982 these became lines 31 and 32). When Line U-6 of the U-Bahn was extended to Floridsdorf in 1996, Line 32 was abolished.

Since 1995, the nightclub Flex has been located on Vorkais immediately next to the bridge.

In Arthur Schnitzler's La Ronde, the opening scene, between The Soldier and the Whore, is set on the bridge.

== District boundardies ==
After the area between Donaukanal and the Danube and the suburbs within the Linienwall were incorporated into Vienna in 1850, the bridge was located within the city limits of Vienna. The boundary between the 2nd district on the one side and the 1st and 9th districts on the other side runs along the right, western bank of the Donaukanal, so the bridge itself belongs to the 2nd district. The end of the bridge on the west bank is mostly in the 9th district, but the right hand side stairway from the bridge to Flex is the northernmost point within the 1st district.

== Bibliography ==
- Zeitschrift des Österreichischen Ingenieur- und Architekten-Vereines, Vienna 1930, ZDB-ID 2534647-7.
- Rudolf Schuhmann: Technik und Wirtschaft. Die neue Augartenbrücke. In: Neue Freie Presse, 7 July 1931, p. 09 (Online at ANNO).
