= Ostbahnbrücke =

Railway bridge in Vienna, Austria

Coordinates: 48°11′12″N 16°25′53″E

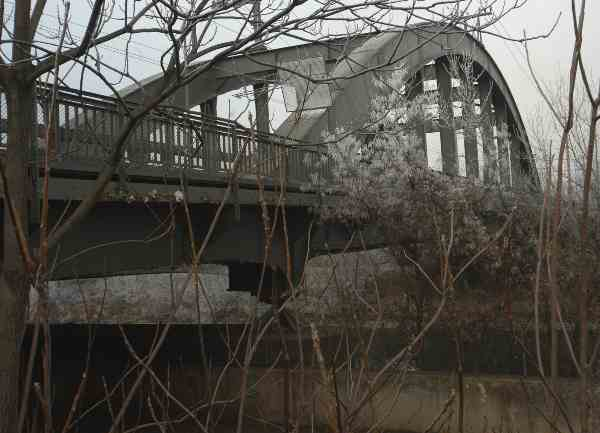
The Ostbahnbrücke

The Ostbahnbrücke is a railway bridge over the Donaukanal in Vienna. It unites the districts of Simmering and Leopoldstadt.

The Ostbahnbrücke is located near the power station in Simmering and the Gasometer.

== History ==
The Ostbahnbrücke was designed by Anton Battig and August Friedrich Nathanael Köstlin. It was constructed in 1870 by the German company C. Harkort and is a truss bridge supporting two sets of rails.

In 1939, the Ostbahnbrücke was strengthened by the Nazis, in order to withhold the increased strain being placed on the bridge by heavier freight transports. The imminent war was probably also a motivation for this work, as it would require greater levels of freight transport. The bridge was blown up during the April 1945 Vienna Offensive.

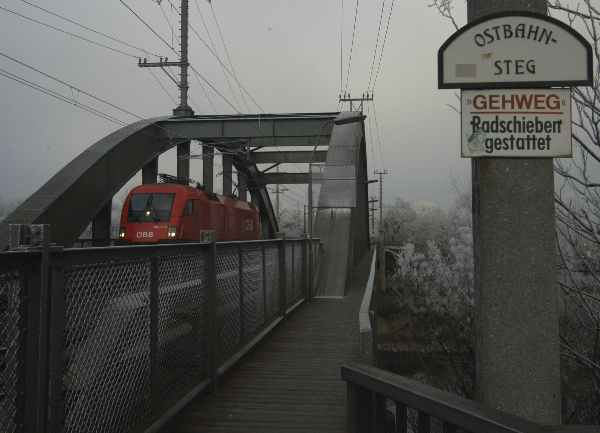
Ostbahnbrücke and the footpath beside the bridge

The Ostbahnbrücke was rebuilt in 1946. It is not known whether the narrow footpath beside the bridge existed before this time. In its publication “Querungen – Brücken-Stadt-Wien” (Crossings – Bridges – City – Vienna), the City of Vienna's department with responsibility for the city's bridges (Magistratsabteilung 29) lists the footpath as a separate structure (Object number 0207 0).
