= Donaukanal =

Waterway in Vienna

Coordinates: 48°12′47″N 16°22′31″E

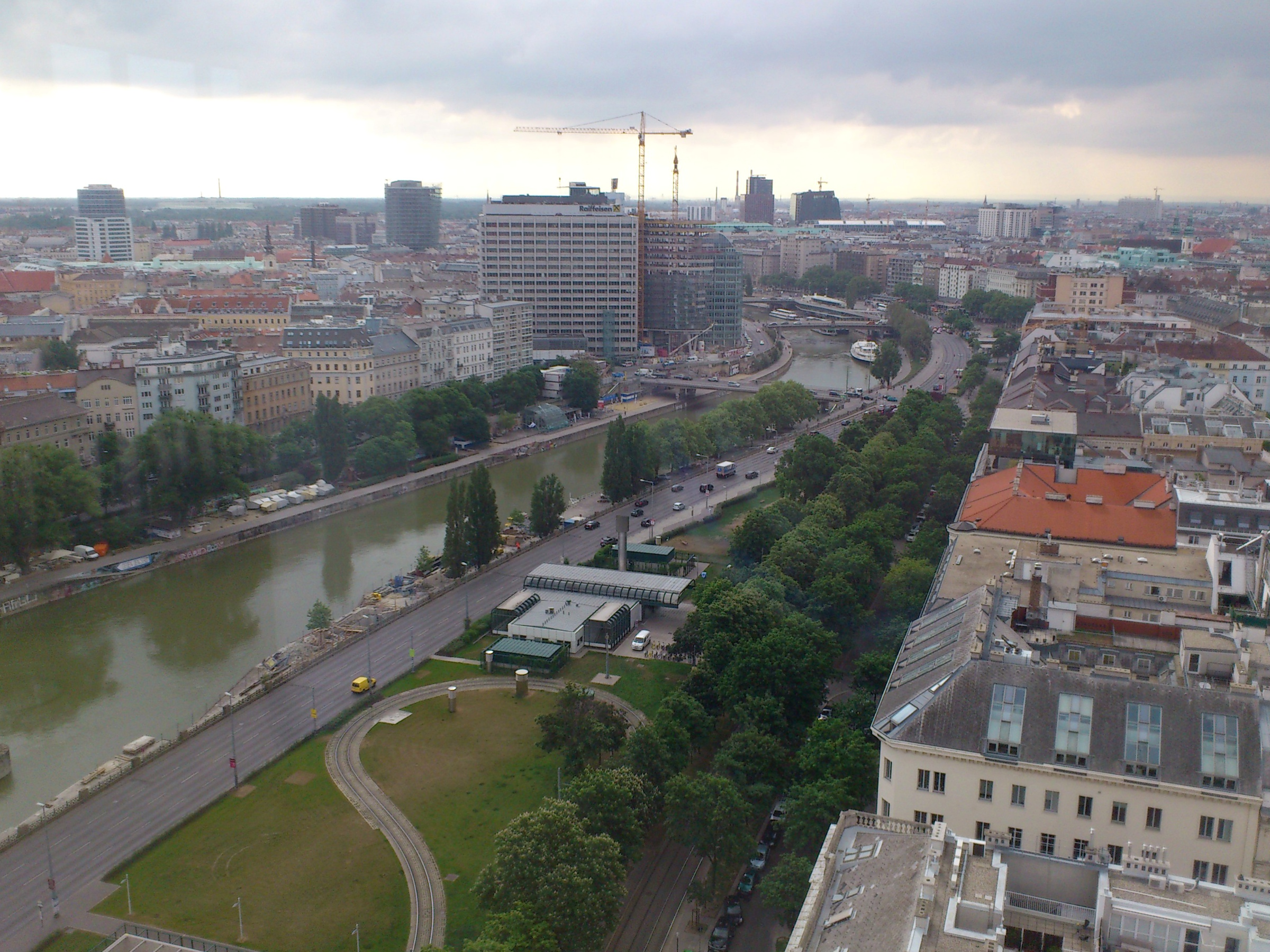
The Donaukanal in the inner city, viewed from Ringturm towards Schwedenplatz, on the left bank is Leopoldstadt

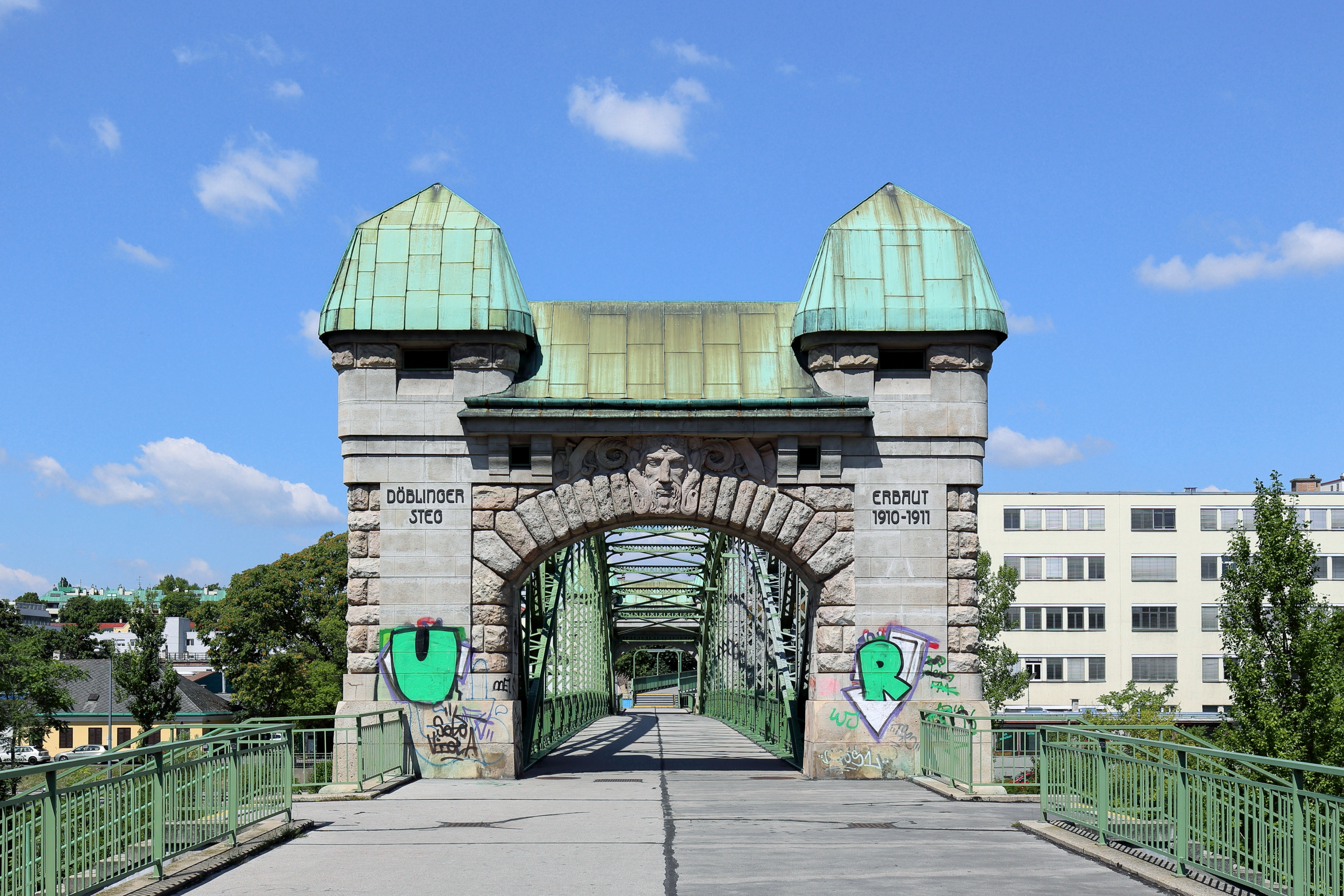
The Döblinger Steg bridge over the Donaukanal

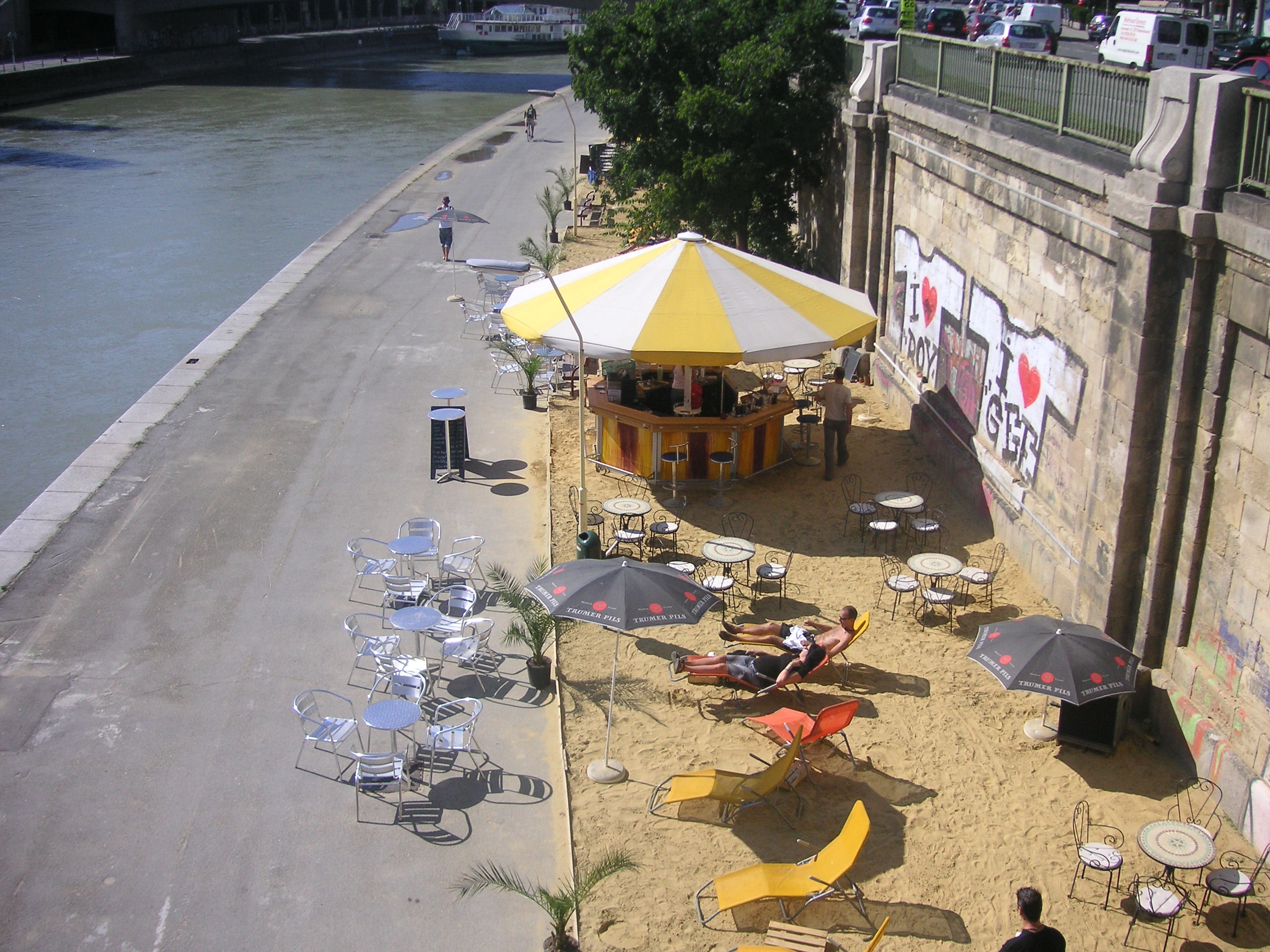
The canal bank in summer

The Donaukanal (German: [ˈdoːnaʊ̯kaˌnaːl], Danube Canal) is a former arm of the river Danube, now regulated as a water channel (since 1598), within the city of Vienna, Austria. It is 17.3 kilometres (10.7 mi) long and, unlike the Danube itself, it borders Vienna's city centre, Innere Stadt, where the Wien River (Wienfluss) flows into it.

The Donaukanal bifurcates from the main river at the Nußdorf weir and lock complex, in Döbling, and joins it again just upstream of the "Praterspitz", at the Prater park in Simmering. The island thus formed between the Donaukanal and the Danube holds two of the 23 districts of Vienna: Brigittenau (20th District) and Leopoldstadt (2nd District). The canal is crossed by fifteen road bridges and five rail bridges.

Because in German, the name Kanal, which has been used since about 1700, evokes associations of an open sewer, attempts at renaming the Donaukanal have been made (one suggestion was Kleine Donau—Little Danube) but have not met with success.

== History ==
The name "Donaukanal" ("Danube Canal"), has been used since 1686, for the southern branch of the River Danube in Vienna. Originally a natural branch, during 1598–1600, it was regulated for the first time by Baron von Hoyos.

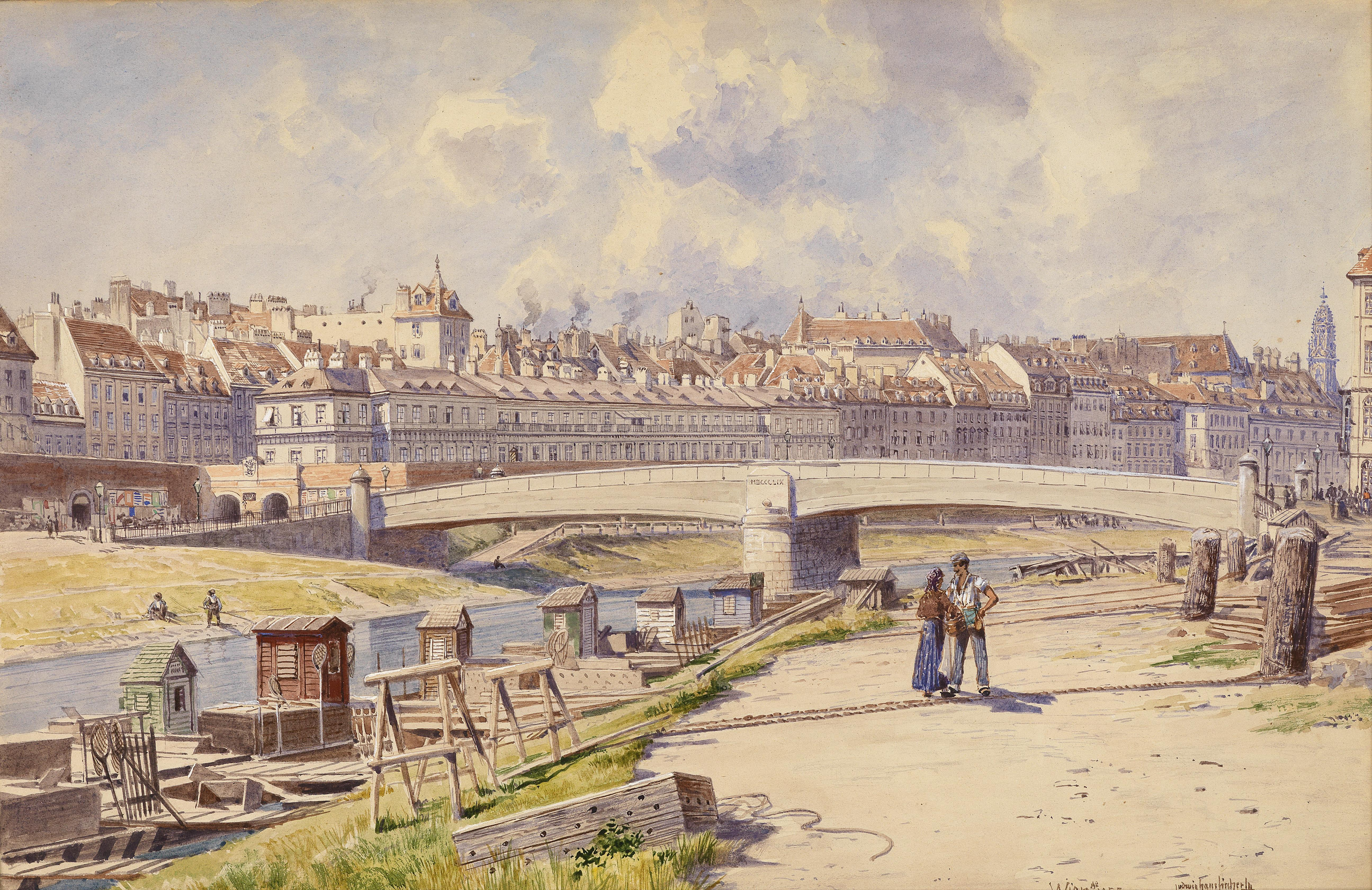
The Donaukanal in 1855

In the 19th century, the Schwimmtor, a movable floating barrier, was constructed near the upstream entrance to the canal. It was designed to protect the canal from floods and drift ice, and entered service in 1873. The Nußdorf weir and lock complex were constructed between 1894 and 1899, and provide a greater degree of flood control than the Schwimmtor. However the Schwimmtor remained in use until World War I, and was not scrapped until 1945.

In the early 1990s, work started in the southern section of the Donaukanal (between the 2nd and 3rd districts) to create a recreation area along its banks.

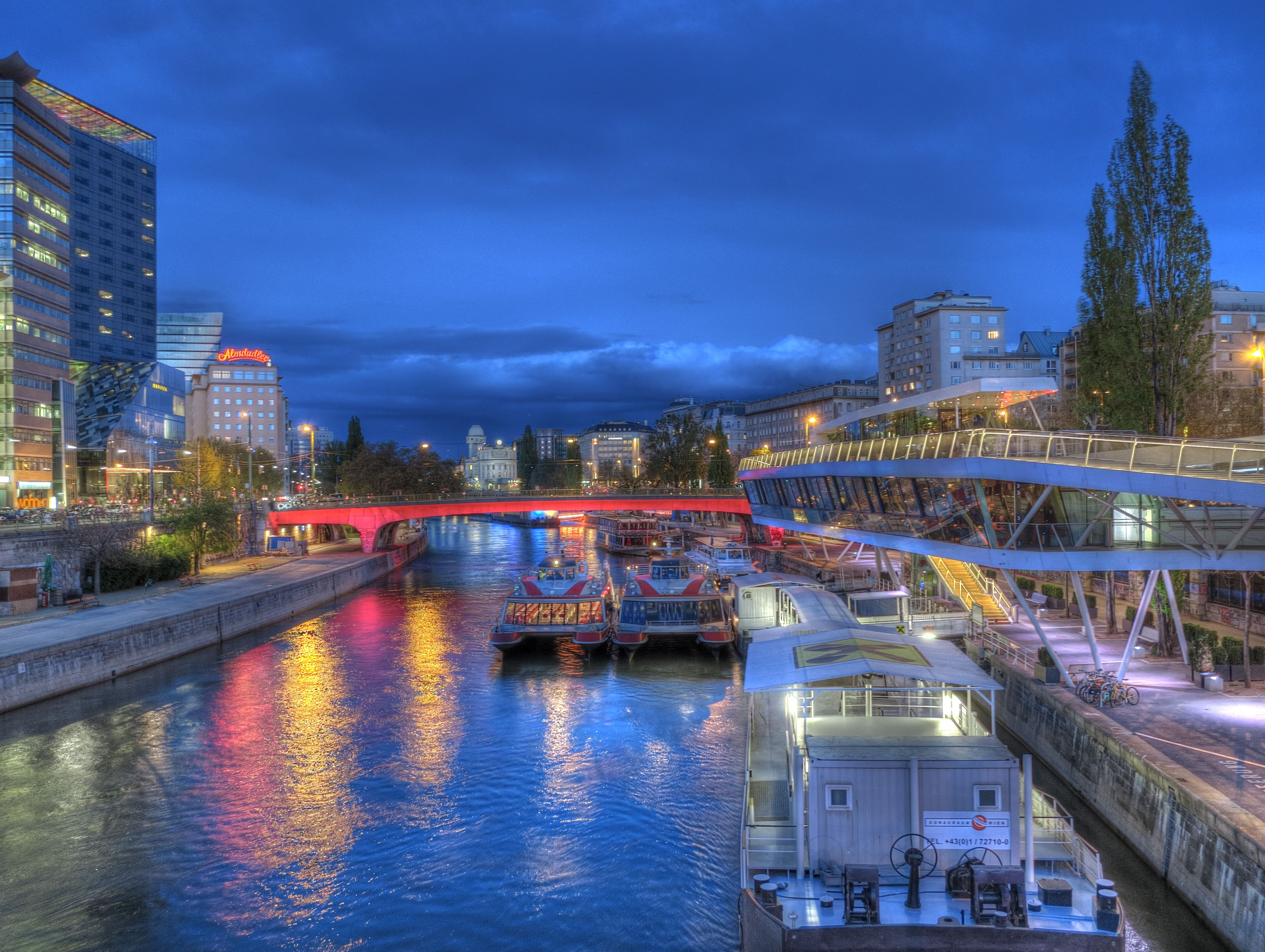
The Schwedenplatz boat terminal by night in April 2012

The Donaukanal is a fixture in the nightlife of Vienna in the 21st century. The open-air bars that line it include “beach bars” with trucked-in sand, deckchairs and reclining sunloungers.

The Donaukanal was the location where, on the night of 25 June 2021, 13 year-old Leonie Walner met the man, Rasuili Zubaidullah, who together with three other accomplices would later drug her, rape her and eventually kill her.

== Usage ==
The paths on both sides of the Donaukanal are regularly used by joggers, cyclists and skaters. Recently, there have been successful attempts during the summer months at turning the place into a more attractive recreational area (summer stages, flea markets, cafés, etc.).

Boat rides circling Leopoldstadt and Brigittenau via the Donaukanal and Danube start at Schwedenplatz, close to the city centre. The same location provides the Vienna terminal of the Twin City Liner fast ferry service that links Vienna with Bratislava, transiting the Donaukanal to reach the Danube.

The Donaukanaltreiben Festival is held every year in June in several locations along the Donaukanal. Mainly Austrian professional and amateur bands are invited but from year to year the organisers invite bands from the neighbouring countries.

== Cultural influences ==
The banks of the Donaukanal were immortalized by Heinz Conrads in his song "A schräge Wiesn" ("A Sloping Lawn"; later covered by Willi Resetarits and Rainhard Fendrich), where the hero, Franz, chooses not to go on holiday. Instead, he spends his spare time napping on the grassy slopes next to the Donaukanal.
