= Schwedenplatz =

Square in Vienna, Austria

Coordinates: 48°12′41″N 16°22′44″E

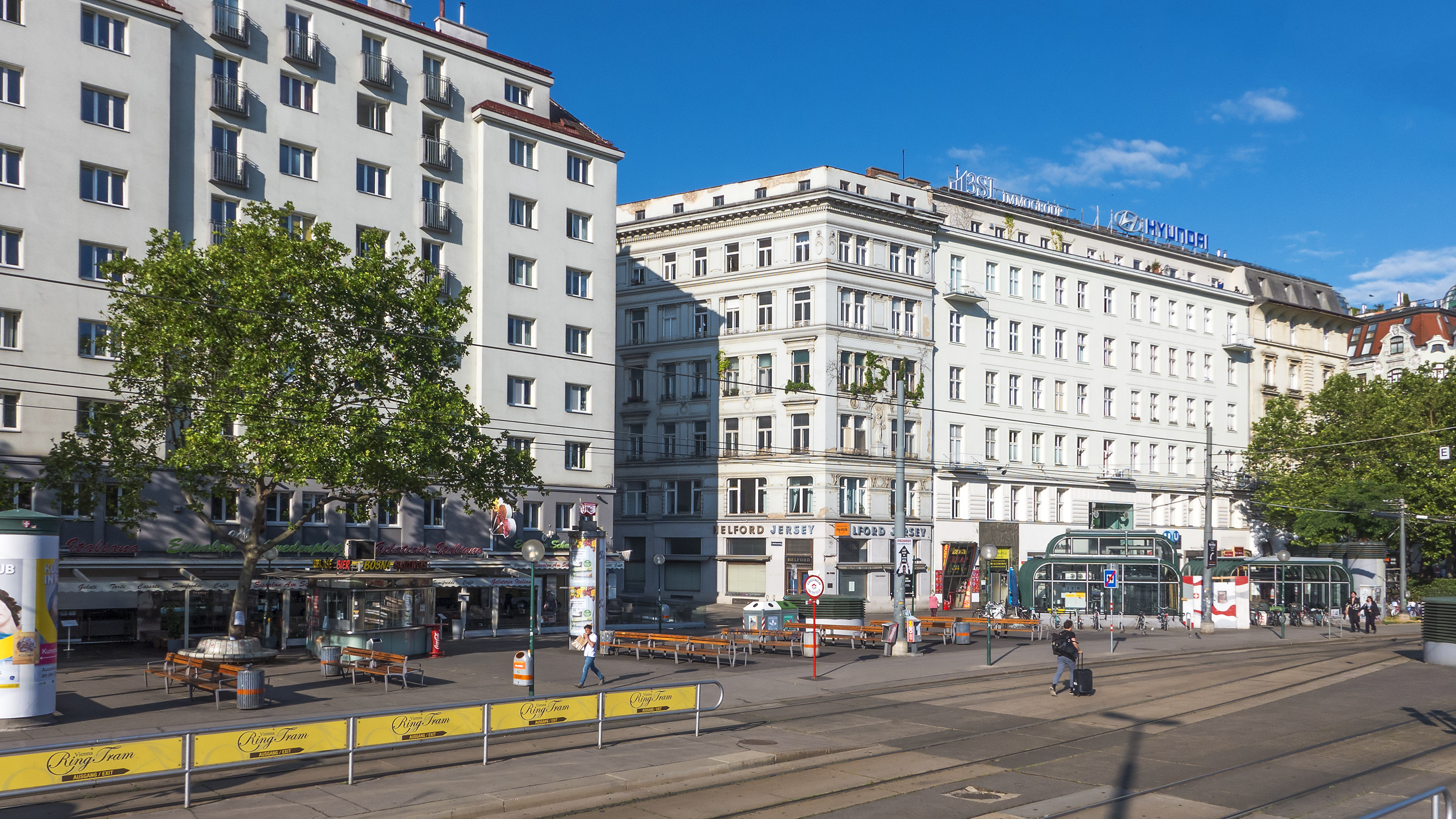
Schwedenplatz

Schwedenplatz (German for Sweden Square) is a square in central Vienna, Austria.

It had previously been called Ferdinandplatz, but was renamed after World War I to thank Sweden for sending aid to Austria.

The Schwedenplatz station of the Vienna U-Bahn lines U1 and U4 is located in the square.

On the 2nd November 2020, a terrorist attack in Vienna in Schwedenplatz killed four people.
