= Schwimmtor =

Coordinates: 48.260291°N 16.369296°E

The Schwimmtor (Floating gate), also known as the Sperrschiff (Blocking ship), was a floating barrier designed to protect the areas along the Donaukanal in Vienna from flooding and ice. It was built by Wilhelm von Engerth, entered service on 13 December 1873, and was scrapped following World War II.

== Supports ==
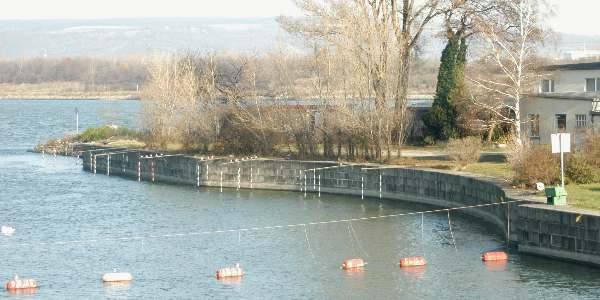
The rounded indentation in the quay wall at Brigittenau

The Schwimmtor was located 166 metres downstream of the Brigittenauer Spitz. The site was chosen because the canal was thin enough at this point that the floating barrier could withstand the pressure which would be caused by an accumulation of floodwater or ice.

A rounded indentation was carved into the left-hand (Brigittenau) quay wall, where the Schwimmtor was to be stowed when it was not needed. Just downstream of this indentation, the quay wall jutted out into the middle of the canal, thereby forming a support against which the barrier could be placed when it was needed.

Supporting the barrier with the same sort of elongated wall on the right-hand (Nussdorf) bank, thus creating a sluice-like gate, would not have been possible, because the current would have made it impossible to remove the barrier again once it had been placed across the canal. For this reason, a niche was carved into this quay wall. The niche was capped and housed two moveable steel barriers (the Stemmtor and the Anlagetor).

These moveable steel barriers could be brought into position by turning a capstan located above the niche. This was connected to the barriers by a rack and pinion, which turned the Stemmtor outward and moved the Anlagetor out of the niche in the wall to form the second support for the floating barrier.

Both the Stemmtor and the Anlagetor were steel truss constructions designed to absorb pressure placed on the floating barrier and to transfer these to the quay wall, to which the Stemmtor was attached.

In order to open the Schwimmtor, the moveable steel barriers were wound back into the niche in the wall using the capstan. The current in the canal would then naturally push the floating barrier back to the Brigittenau quay.

The Schwimmtor could be made to sit lower in the water if loaded with ballast. However, in order to prevent it from blocking the bottom of the canal, four struts made of cast iron and filled with concrete were produced. These ensured that an opening 95 centimetres tall was kept free. The small size of this opening resulted in a very rapid passage of water with great destructive force. The struts were therefore placed on a concrete plate 126 centimetres thick and 30 metres long.

== The Schwimmtor ==
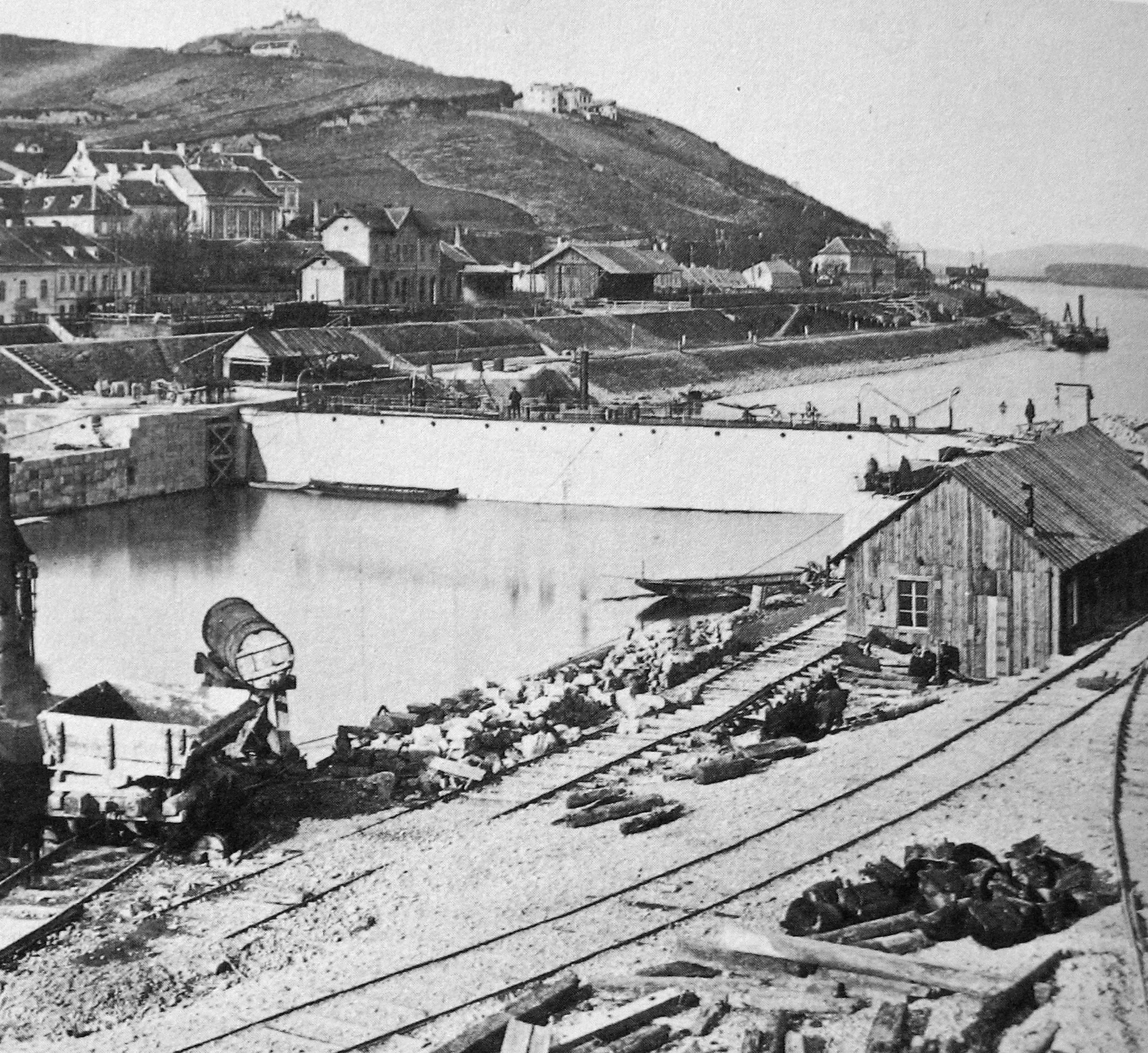
The Schwimmtor in 1873

The Schwimmtor was a symmetrical-shaped barge without any means of propulsion. It could only be brought into place by means of man-powered winches and the natural current of the canal. Wilhelm von Engerth had not approved the construction of a steam-powered winch because it would have been too expensive.

The Schwimmtor was produced in the John Cockerill’s steel factory in Seraing (Belgium) under the Austrian chief engineer J. Ritter von Kraft. It was assembled in the shipyard in Linz (Upper Austria).

- Measurements:

Length: 48.6 metres

Width in the middle: 9.5 metres

Width at the tips: 1.0 metres

Height: 5.7 metres

Weight: 440 tonnes

The Schwimmtor was coated with steel sheets on its sides and on the bottom. These were 10-12 millimetres thick and riveted in place.

- Additional features of the Schwimmtor:

Boiler with 30 m^{2} heated surface

Two centrifugal pumps (each of which could shift 165 cubic metres of water per hour)

Two manual pumps

A manual device for loading ballast (which could load 1000 stones per hour or unload 600 stones per hour)

Steam heating, which was designed to prevent the valves and pipes connecting the pumps from freezing.

2000 kilograms of cast iron were kept on board as ballast. Up to 1200 granite stone blocks weighing 17.5 kilograms each could also be loaded as required. The Schwimmtor’s water tanks could also be flooded to make the barrier sit deeper in the water.

The decision to employ the Schwimmtor depended on the level of the water at the Ferdinandsbrücke (today the Schwedenbrücke). When the Danube flooded, ballast was loaded onto the barrier to make it sit deeper in the water, although it was essential that it never completely blocked the flow of the canal. The amount of ballast on board therefore had to be constantly adjusted as the level of the water in the Danube rose and fell.

In order to guard against ice being driven downstream in winter, it was sufficient to place the barrier across the surface of the canal. The Schwimmtor’s straight sides meant that very little ice was pushed beneath it. It was however important that the barrier could rise and fall with the level of water in the canal.

The Schwimmtor was later fitted out with “ice needles”. These were steel spikes that could be attached to the sides of the barrier. They reached to the bottom of the canal and served to catch ice chunks before these could pass underneath the blockade.

== The weir and lock in Nussdorf ==
The Schwimmtor remained in service even after the construction of a weir and lock in Nussdorf, but fell out of use during World War I and was finally scrapped after World War II.

The rounded indentation in the quay wall on the Brigittenau bank, the supporting wall jutting out into the canal, and the niche in the wall on the Nussdorf side of the canal have all survived to the modern day. The capstan which was used to move the Stemmtor and Anlagetor has also been preserved.
