= Wilhelm Engerth =

Austrian architect and engineer

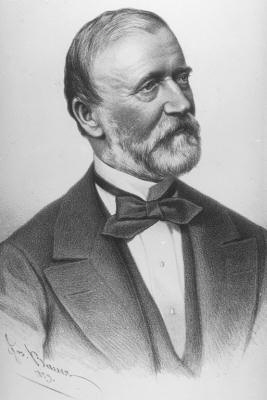
Wilhelm von Engerth 1879

Wilhelm Freiherr von Engerth (26 May 1814 – 4 September 1884) was an Austrian architect and engineer, known for being the designer of the first practical mountain locomotive. For his services he was created a baron in 1875.

== Life and work ==
Wilhelm Engerth was born on 26 May 1814 at Pleß in Prussian Silesia (present-day Pszczyna, Silesian Voivodeship, Poland). From 1834 Engerth studied at Vienna - firstly architecture and then mechanical engineering - and then went to Galicia as an architect, where he was soon entrusted with a lot of work. He returned to Vienna in order to devote himself to engineering, became a teacher of mechanics at the Polytechnikum, then professor of descriptive geometry and, in 1844, professor of mechanics and engineering principles at the Joanneum in Graz.

He designed a tender locomotive for the Semmering railway (Semmeringbahn) which met the requirements so well that, since then, his Engerth system has found many uses.

In 1850 Engerth was nominated as the technical director (Rat) on the executive board for railways, and later took over the Department of Engineering in the Austrian Ministry of Trade. In 1855 he took over as Zentraldirektor of the Austrian railways and later became its managing director (Generaldirektor).

In 1859 he was a member of the Zollenquetekommission and in 1860 he left government service. He worked with great circumspection (Umsicht) on the organisation of technical studies in Austria and was one of the most enthusiastic proponents of regulating the Danube river. He invented the Schwimmtor, a barrier for preventing floating ice from entering the Danube canal. At the Vienna World Exposition in 1873 he acted as the head of engineering and led the construction of the exhibition halls as the chief engineer. He instigated the tunnels through the Arlberg. In 1874 he was called to the upper house (Herrenhaus) of the Austrian parliament, the Reichsrat and, in 1875 created a baron. He died on 4 September 1884 in Leesdorf, part of Baden bei Wien, Lower Austria. His brother was the artist, Eduard von Engerth.

== Publications ==
- Wilhelm Engerth: Die Lokomotive der Staats-Eisenbahn über den Semmering: Resultate d. Erprobung d. Kettenkuppelung an d. Preis-Lokomotive Bavaria, Erörterung d. Konstruktionen d. Wilhelm Engerth: Bildliche Darstellungen der einfachen Maschinen in isometrischer Projection/entworfen von Wilhelm Engerth. Wien 1845.
- Wilhelm Engerth: Konkurs-Lokomotive u. Beschreibung mehrerer projektirten Gebirgs-Lokomotive; mit einem Atlas von 13 Kupfertaf. u. einem lithogr. Längenprofile d. Semmeringbahn. Aus: Zeitschrift des Österreichischen Ingenieur-Vereins. 1853 u. 1854. (Umschlagt.: Semmering Locomotive).
- Wilhelm Engerth: Personen- und Lastwagen, Tender-Ausrüstung, Werkstätten-Einrichtung und Werkzeuge. Zeichnungen aus der K. K. Österreichischen Staatseisenbahn-Gesellschaft. Wien 1857.
- Wilhelm von Engerth: Das Schwimmthor zur Absperrung des Wiener Donaucanales. Wien 1884.
- Eduard Frhr. von Engerth: Wilhelm Freiherr von Engerth: Ein Gedenkblatt zu seinem 100. Geburtstag (26. Mai 1814). Wien 1914.

== See also ==
- List of railway pioneers
