= Hietzing =

Coordinates: 48°10′53″N 16°15′29″E

Hietzing Hietzing (Bavarian)
- 13th District of Vienna
- Coat of arms

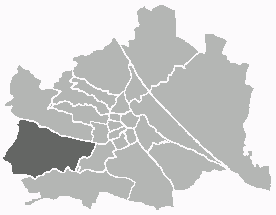
- Location of the district within Vienna
- Country: Austria
- City: Vienna

Government
  - District director: Johanna Sperker (ÖVP)
  - First deputy: Dorothea Drlik (ÖVP)
  - Second deputy: Reinhard Feistritzer (SPÖ)
  - Representation (40 Members): ÖVP 12, SPÖ 9, Greens 8, FPÖ 5, NEOS 5, KPÖ 1

Area
  - Total: 37.70 km^{2} (14.56 sq mi)

Population (2016-01-01)
  - Total: 53,829
  - Density: 1,428/km^{2} (3,698/sq mi)
- Postal code: A-1130
- Address of District Office: Hietzinger Kai 1-3; A-1130 Wien
- Website: www.wien.gv.at/bezirke/hietzing/

Hietzing (German pronunciation: [ˈhɪtsɪŋ]) is the 13th district of Vienna (German: 13. Bezirk, Hietzing). It is located west of the central districts, west of Meidling. Hietzing is a heavily populated urban area with many residential buildings, but also contains large areas of the Vienna Woods, along with Schönbrunn Palace.

== Geography ==
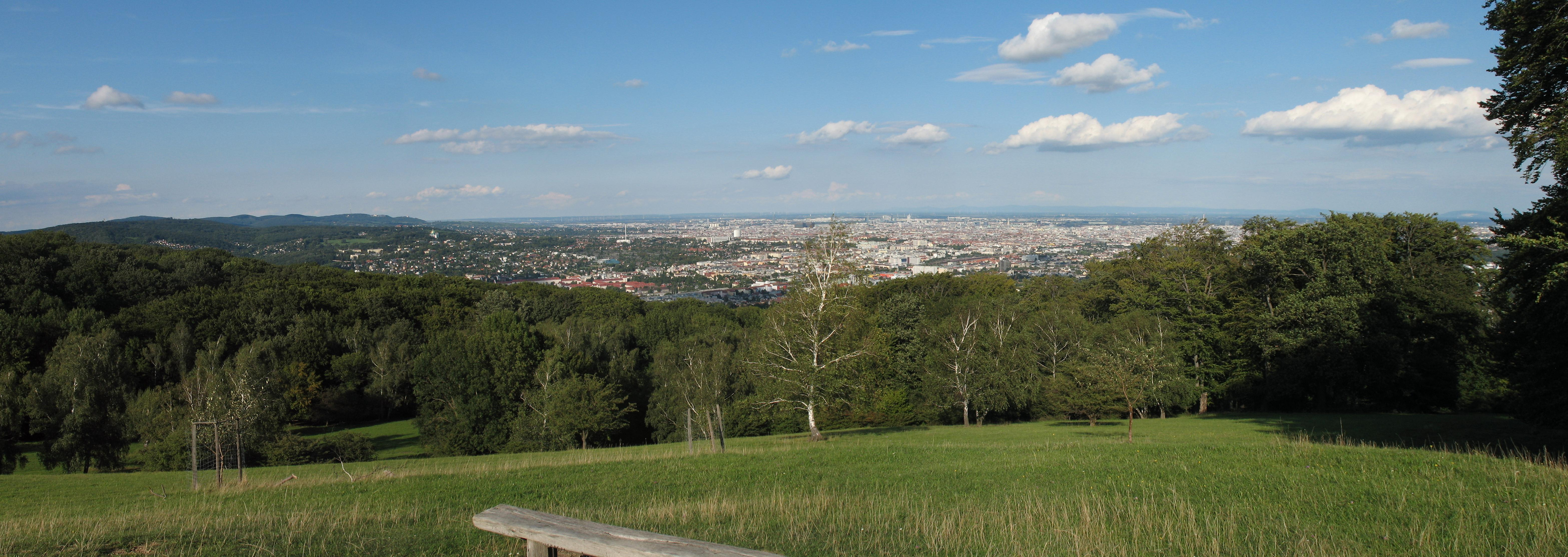
Lainzer Tiergarten

The thirteenth district is located at the western end of the city where it borders the Wienerwald. Liesing is to the south, Meidling to the east and Penzing, which was part of Hietzing until 1954, and Rudolfsheim-Fünfhaus, to the north. Most of the northern border is formed by the River Wien.

Traditionally, it is subdivided into six parts: Hietzing (northeast), Unter Sankt Veit (northwest), Ober Sankt Veit (west of Unter Sankt Veit), Hacking (northwest of Ober Sankt Veit), Lainz (geographic centre) and Speising (south).

Furthermore, the Lainzer Tiergarten, a large park in the Wienerwald populated by boars, and Schönbrunn Palace and the surrounding parks are part of Hietzing.

== District sections ==
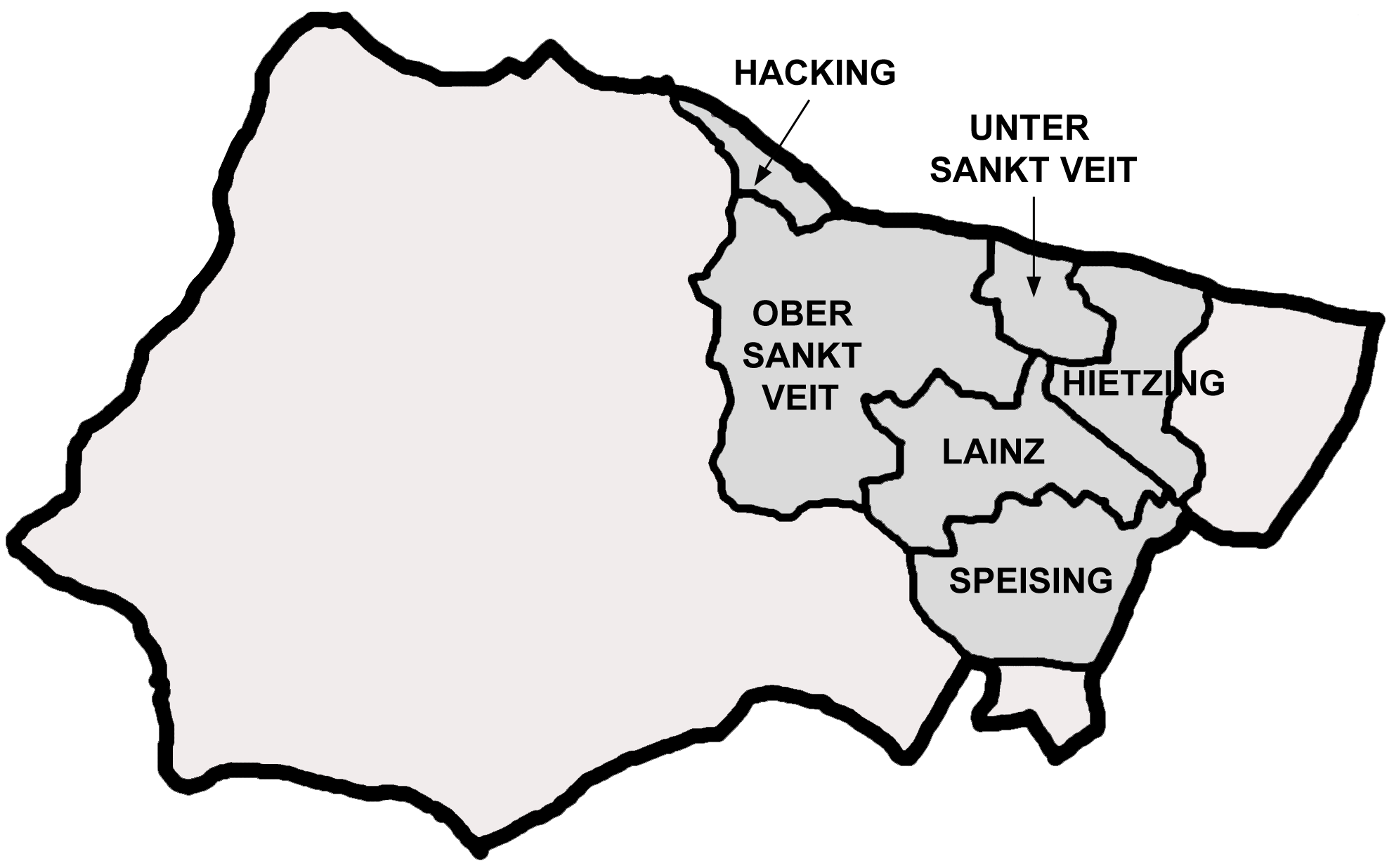
The 9 district-sections of Hietzing

Hietzing was formed from the six former municipalities Hietzing, Unter-St.-Veit, Ober-St.-Veit, Hacking, Lainz and Speising, and is now divided into nine Katastralgemeinden. Six of the Katastralgemeinden broadly align with the former municipal areas. Rosenberg as well as its own Schönbrunn form Katastralgemeinden. Comes to Katastralgemeinde add Auhof, which covers large parts of the district area and essentially Lainzer Tiergarten. Even a small part of Katastralgemeinden Hütteldorf and Unterbaumgarten (14th District) are on Hietzinger area.

A breakdown of the district area is also in the census-districts of official statistics in which the census figures of the district municipalities are combined. The eleven census-districts of Hietzing are: Schönbrunn, Hietzing, Auhofstraße, Ober-St.-Veit, Gemeindeberg-Jagdschloßgasse, Lainz, Maxing, Speising, Altersheim Lainz (today: Geriatriezentrum Am Wienerwald), Lainzer Tiergarten and Friedensstadt. Despite partial name matches, the boundaries of the census-districts do not match with those of Katastralgemeinden.

=== Land use ===
The developed area of Hietzing includes only 21.5% (33.3% Vienna-wide) of area of the district, where this is the second lowest value of a municipality of Vienna. The space itself is distributed as 78.7% to 16.5%, for residential areas versus total area of cultural, religious, or sports venues (devoted to public purposes). This relatively high figure is compared to one for a Viennese township as a very low proportion of farmland (4.3% of the area to be developed).

Greenspace in Hietzing takes in a share of 71.7%. This is the highest value in Vienna, where the largest area of Lainzer Tiergarten is included. Nearly 73.4% of green space is accounted for by forest, 15.5% more green space are the meadows, parks 6.3%, and 2.5% in small gardens. Agricultural land (1.5%) and leisure areas (10.8%), are only a small proportion of green space territories.

Waters in Hietzing take in an area of 0.8% (Wienerwald streams in Lainzer Tiergarten). The proportion of traffic areas in the district region is, with 6.0%, the lowest value in Vienna.

Space allocation in 2003
Builtspace			Greenspace						Water	Transport areas
808.8			2,703.6						29.2	227.6
Residences	Oper- ations	Public Facilities	Farms	Parks	Forests	Meadows	Small gardens	Rec. areas		
636.4	34.68	133.7	41.53	171.4	1,984.3	66.88	418.07	21.64		

== History ==
=== From village to suburb of Vienna ===
The name "Hietzing" derives itself from "Hiezo" or "Hezzo" (short form of "Heinrich"). The first authentic mention comes from the year 1130. Since 1253 the Klosterneuburg Abbey appeared. The oldest properties were in the area of Altgasse, north therefrom (direction of the Wienfluss canal) were cattle meadows, a few south fields and expanded vineyards. In the vicinity of the Küniglberg and around the zone of the current Hietzinger cemetery, there was also a quarry as well as sand pits and gravel pits whose material was used in the building of Schoenbrunn castle.

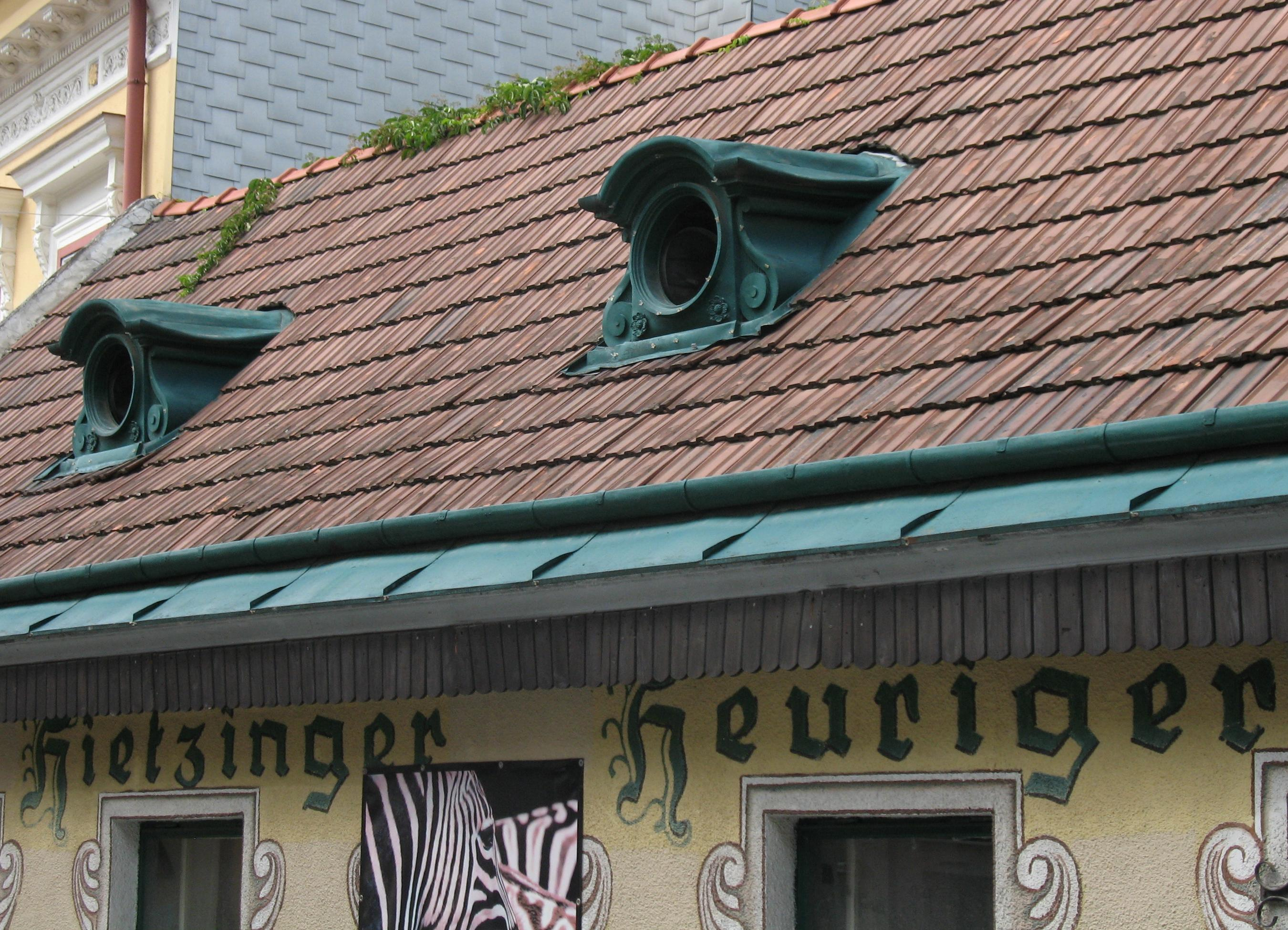
Former wine tavern „Hietzinger Heuriger“

Before the first Turkish siege (1529), Hietzing was an emerging wine-making place. After the heavy destruction, the place recovered quickly. The mid-17th century began the transformation of the vineyards into farmland. The growing popularity of the pilgrimage site, "Maria Hietzing" required the expansion of Seelsorge. Choir house and community inn were erected where pilgrims had a possible overnight stay.

The second Turkish siege (1683) devastated the place and the remaining vineyards. The place was almost depopulated, and the new settlement proceeded only slowly. The construction of the castle Schoenbrunn, which was built on the site of the destroyed 1683 Katterburg, eventually led to the great boom of the former village Hietzing. The proximity of the Imperial Court brought with it strong construction activity, but it was yet to create quarters for aristocrats and officials.

The rapid increase in the number of houses, in the late 18th and early 19th century, changed the structure of the place. The new houses were built by people who occupied superior social position and, in Hietzing, spent the summer. This influx increased the earnings potential of the villagers and shapes the image of Hietzing to the present day.

In 1860, the current district area was reached by the first modern transportation: the connection train, Verbindungsbahn (Vienna), with stops in St. Veit, Lainz und Speising. The train was led through a very thinly populated zone at that time.

=== Incorporation ===
In 1890/1892, the current district areas were summarized (without the Lainzer Tiergarten zoo) and the suburbs north of the Vienna Wienfluss: Penzing, Breitensee Baumgarten and Hütteldorf, then incorporated as the 13th District, with the name Hietzing.

Hietzing was reached from 1899 until 1925 with the Viennese operated Dampfloks city train (since 1981 U-train-lines U4) with its Vienna valley line. From 1907, the district was connected through electric streetcar lines (previously: horse train) with the city center. The stretches into the west of the district, after Ober-St.-Veit, and into the south over the district-section Speising to Mauer (today 23rd district) and Mödling, at that time both in lower Austria, were led a few more years as a Dampftramway.

The city of Vienna under Mayor Karl Lueger (term 1902–1904), in the district-section Lainz, allowed construction of 31 buildings collected as a "care home", later as a retirement home, then as a nursing home, and currently known as the Geriatriezentrum Am Wienerwald (Geriatric Center at the Vienna Woods).

The Rothschild Foundation opened a hospital in 1912 in the district-section Speising, one still existing today: Nathaniel Freiherr von Rothschild Foundation for Nerve Disease - Neurological Center of the city of Vienna - Rose Hill; the area thereto was specifically incorporated into Vienna.

Cafe Dommayer in Vienna's Hietzing district holds a prominent place in music history. Famous for its association with the Viennese waltz, the venue was celebrated in popular song, which commemorated the rustling waltzes coming from "Dommayer z'haus" (Dommayer's house).

Two still very well known Hietzinger residents in the reign of Emperor Franz Joseph were: Johann Strauss II, the "Waltz King" and Katharina Schratt, the confidante of the Emperor. Even the emperor himself, in his last years, lived year-round in Schoenbrunn, and thus in the district and died here in 1916. Of famous painters, Egon Schiele died in the 13th District, in 1918.

In the period between the wars, the building of the work alliance settlement is remarkable.

=== 1938 and the consequences ===
On 12 March 1938, with Austria now part of Germany and known as "Ostmark", 'official' removal of Jewish citizens commenced. Many were expelled or killed. Their properties and villas were "aryanised". The villa of the family Blaimschein, located at the corner Lainzer Straße and Wenzgasse, was made available in April 1945 by the Red Army State Registrar Karl Renner as the first residence in Vienna. (Today the building is the Iranian Embassy in Vienna.)

The district area north of Vienna was declared, at the Nazi-territorial reform of 15 October 1938 (see Greater-Vienna) to become the new 14th District, after which this district number was vacant by pooling of Rudolfsheim und Fünfhaus to the 15th District. By this redistricting, Hietzing had lost 94,000 of its 140,000 inhabitants from 1934. The magistrate for the 13th and 14th District is located in Hietzing currently.

In 1938/1939, the Nazi regime set forth in a pheasant garden behind the Schlosspark of Schoenbrunn, started military construction, and built an SS barracks. It is now under the name of Maria Theresa Barracks, or Fasanengarten barracks, used by the armed forces. During the Second World War, the district showed much smaller bomb damage than other districts, since no major industries or major railway lines existed.

=== After 1945 ===
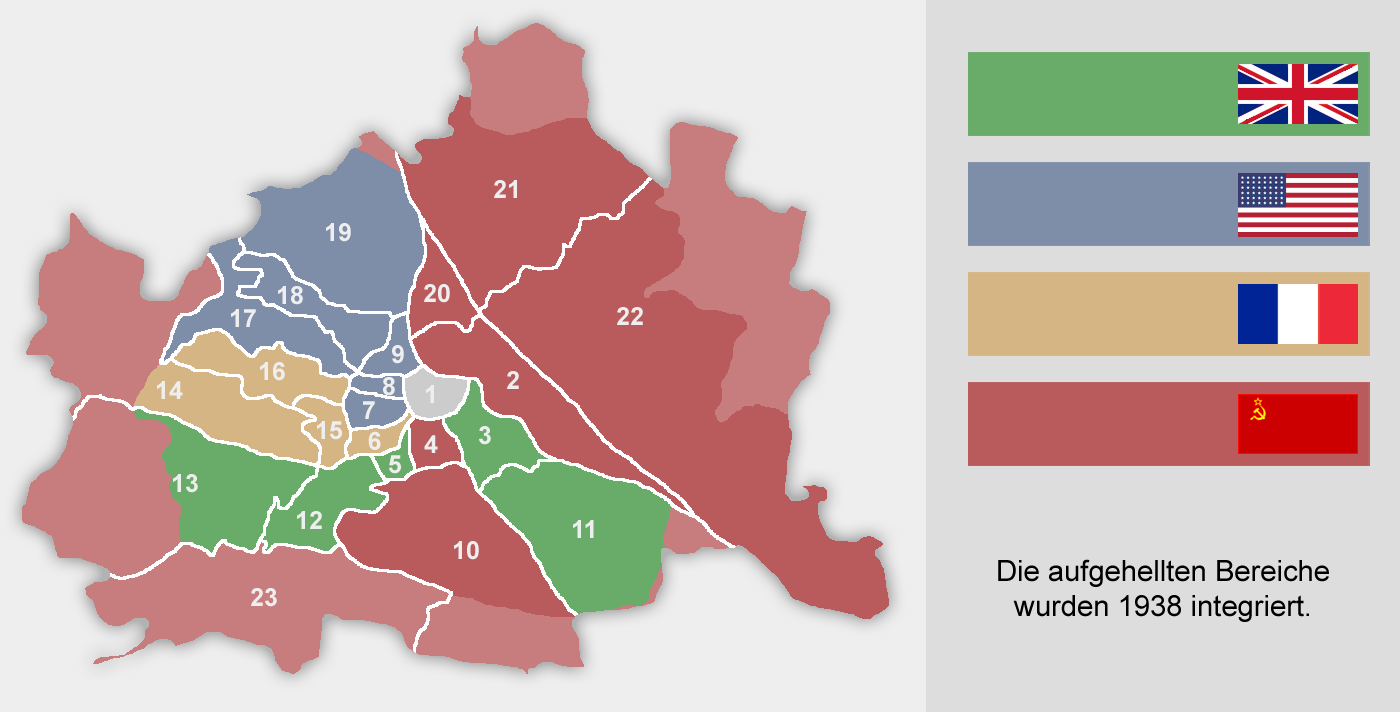
Occupation zones in Vienna (1945-1955)

Vienna was taken in the Vienna Offensive of the Red Army on 13 April. From the autumn of 1945 to autumn 1955, Vienna was occupied by the four Allied powers and the 5th District was a part of the British sector - parades of the British army thus took place in the main courtyard of Schoenbrunn Palace, being used as their HQ. In 1952, key scenes were shot there of the Austrian film "1. April 2000" (director: Wolfgang Liebeneiner), in which the Austrian Government finally gets rid of the occupying powers in the year 2000. In the film, a spaceship lands in Ehrenhof, as thousands of people watched.

The Lainzer Tiergarten became, through the 1938 territorial reform, part of the urban area. Hietzing became incorporated first in 1956, resulting in vastly larger surface area. Until then, it had belonged to the District Liesing.

Since the late 1960s, the ORF operates, which by Roland Rainer designed and in 1975 completed ORF center Küniglberg, in which central TV and radio studios and directors and management of the public broadcaster are located. The name of the unassuming hill in the 13th District has since been used as a synonym for the ORF in the Austrian media discussion omnipresent. The building is, 40 years after its creation, renovated, and the financial problems of ORF were ridden about 2008, the headquarters of the institute to relocate.

In 1997, at Rosenhügel (rose hill) in the area of Bertégasse und Wastlgasse, a slight modification was made to the border at the District Liesing, which mainly affected a small rural settlement.

For details on the history of the district, see District sections; for the 1938 detached parts of the district, see: Penzing.

== Population ==
Historical population
Year	Pop.	±%
1869	9,808	—
1880	11,585	+18.1%
1890	14,520	+25.3%
1900	20,095	+38.4%
1910	34,883	+73.6%
1923	39,231	+12.5%
1934	44,157	+12.6%
1939	45,813	+3.8%
1951	46,995	+2.6%
1961	54,191	+15.3%
1971	57,068	+5.3%
1981	55,331	−3.0%
1991	54,909	−0.8%
2001	49,573	−9.7%
2011	50,626	+2.1%
2021	53,817	+6.3%
Source: Censuses

In 1869, the current area of the Hietzing District included only 9,808 inhabitants. Due to the low population density at that time, Hietzing was one of the few districts which had a persistent population growth. Before the start of the First World War, the population in 1910, with 34,883 inhabitants, had more than tripled, but then the growth slowed down. In 1971, the district reached 57,068 people, the highest population to date. Then the population stagnated, falling 4% during the next 2 decades, and later dropping another 10% in the 1990s, but rose gradually after the millennium year. From 2001, the population in Vienna citywide trended to grow, including in Hietzing. At the beginning of 2007, the population stood at 51,120 people.

=== Population structure ===
The average age of Hietzinger population in 2001 was significantly higher than the average in Vienna. Fundamentals are the high density of pensioners-houses, a large nursing home in Lainz (Geriatriezentrum at Wienerwald) and a very small proportion of foreigners. The number of children under 15 years stood at 13.0%, as only slightly below the Vienna average of 14.7%. The proportion of the population from 15 to 59 years, however, with 56.8% (Vienna: 63.6%), was strongly below average. The proportion of people aged 60 years or more in 2001 was 30.2% (Vienna: 21.7%), the highest of the whole of Vienna. Due to the high proportion of older people in 2001, the proportion of women in Hietzing was the largest in Vienna: 44.3% men, 55.7% were women. The number of Hietzing married had a share of 42.8%, compared with Vienna citywide 41.2%, so slightly above the average of Vienna [6].

=== Origin and language ===
The proportion of foreign district residents in 2005 was 10.4% (Vienna citywide: 18.7%) and has over 2001 (7.9%) in Vienna as strong rising trend. The highest proportion of foreigners in 2005 represented approximately 2.1% share of the district population of nationals from Germany. Hietzing was next to the inner city as the district with the highest German foreign residents. Another 1.4% were citizens of Serbia and Montenegro, 0.7% were Polish, 0.5% Turkish, and 0.4% Slovak citizens. In 2001, a total of 16.3% of the population of the Hietzing District was not born in Austria. Nearly 1.9% expressed as a language Serbian, 0.5% Turkish, and 1.0% Croatian.

=== Religious preferences ===
The distribution of religious preferences of the population in the 13th District, in 2001, differed most from the average in Vienna. With 57.7% of residents being Roman Catholic (Vienna: 49.2%), it is the highest of all districts of Vienna. There are 8 districts of Roman Catholic parishes, the city Deanery 13 images. Also, the percentage of people with Protestant religion reached 7.4%, as the highest value of a Vienna district. The proportion of people with different religions, on other hand, was very low: 1.7% is known to Islam, 2.1% for the orthodoxy. About 24.5% said they had no religious community, another 6.6% gave no information about this or any other religion mentioned.

== Politics ==
District Directors from 1945
Hans Mayer (KPÖ)	4/1945–7/1945
Anton Figl (SPÖ)	7/1945–1946
Josef Cudlin (ÖVP)	1946–1950
Otmar Hassenberger (ÖVP)	1950–1953
Ernst Florian (ÖVP)	1953–1959
Josef Fischer (SPÖ)	1959–1964
Josef Gerstbach (ÖVP)	1964–1969
Eduard Popp (SPÖ)	1969–1976
Eugen Gutmannsbauer (SPÖ)	1976–1978
Elfriede Bischof (ÖVP)	1978–1990
Heinz Gerstbach (ÖVP)	1990–

District Vote levels 1991-2010
Jahr	SPÖ	ÖVP	FPÖ	Grüne	LIF	BZÖ	Sonstige
1991	37.7	38.2	15.4	8.2	n.k	-	0.5
1996	29.0	38.6	16.8	7.1	7.0	-	1.5
2001	31.7	36.7	15.1	12.2	3.7	-	0.7
2005	33.4	39.5	8.8	16.0	0.5	0.8	1.1
2010	29.2	36.5	15.2	15.7	1.2	1.4	0.9

The role as majority-party and thereby the claim to the district director has long been disputed between the SPÖ and ÖVP political parties: the traditional, conservative-oriented residential neighborhoods, versus the "public housing" complexes and the large nursing home Lainz, both with a predominantly social democratic electorate. In the postwar years, initially from 1946 to 1959, the ÖVP named the district director. Afterward, the majority alternated as the most votes from the ÖVP or SPÖ party. From 1978, the ÖVP was able to regain its position as the largest party; they could hold this position until today.

While the ÖVP majority has been relatively stable since 1991, in later election results, starting from 1996, the Social Democrats slipped to a low point, from which benefited in particular the Freedom Party (FPÖ) and the Liberal Forum (LiF). After the electoral defeats of the FPÖ and LiF in 2001 and 2005, the SPÖ was able to regain votes. In 2005, the Greens overtook the Freedom Party (FPÖ) and rose to the third strongest force. After an intermezzo the defeat-serie of the SPÖ continued in 2010 also the ÖVP and the Greens lost votes that year and FPÖ, BZÖ and the LIF could increase their votes. In the 2015 elections the ÖVP regained votes while the SPÖ and Greens lost seats. NEOS was able to win 2 seats in their first district election after forming a party alliance with former LiF.

== Coat of arms ==
The crest of the Hietzing District consists of five parts: Hietzing (center), Hacking (top left), Sankt Veit (top right), Speising (bottom left) and Lainz (bottom right). In the tree crown, one finds the Virgin Mary with baby Jesus, in the golden rays of the cross, flanked by two angels. Under the tree, four farmers are praying.

Hietzing Coat of arms.

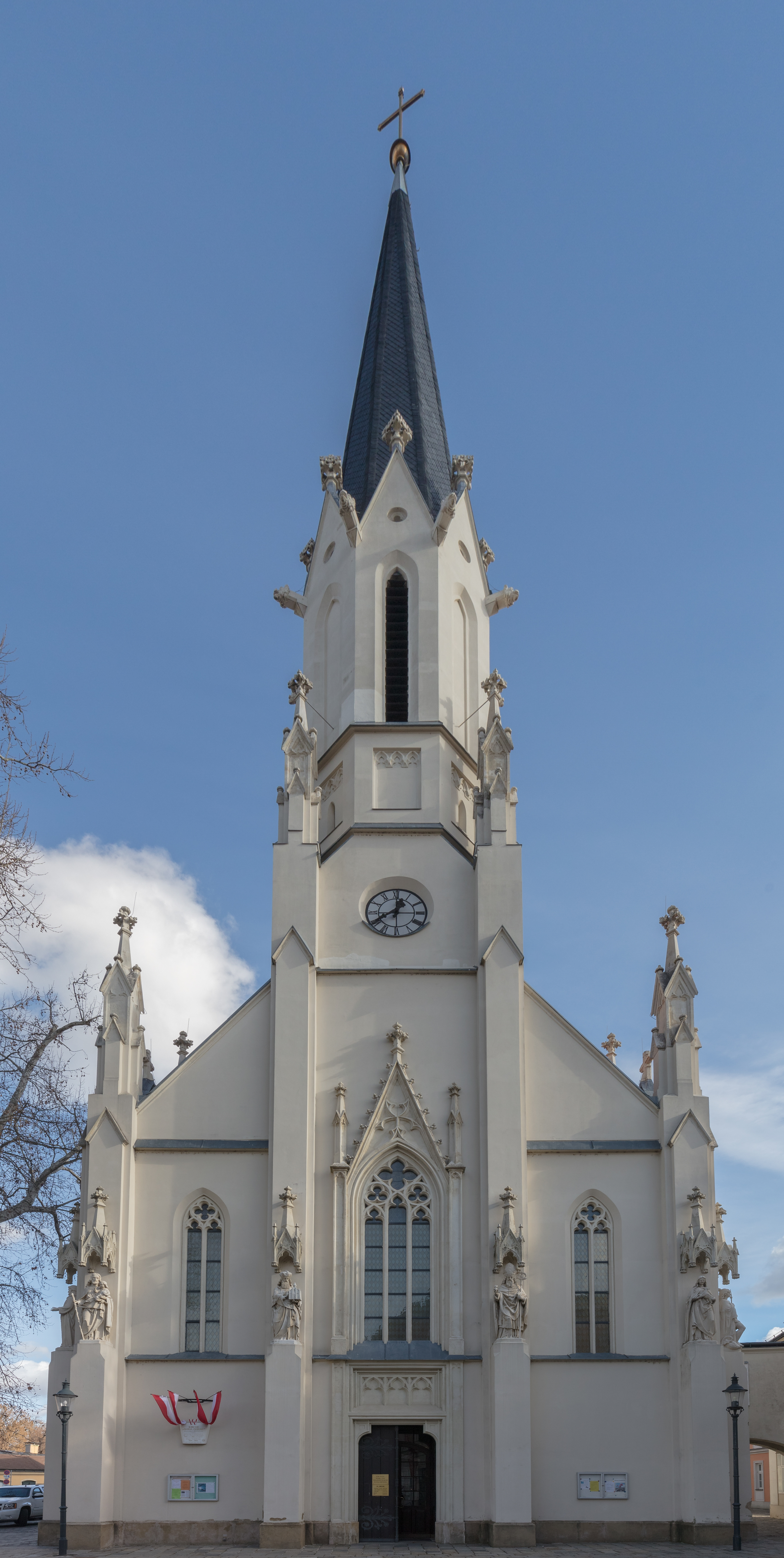
Parish church.

There is a legend as to the origin of the Mother of God in the emblem, but also the origin of the name derived Hietzing. During the 2nd Turkish Siege, Hietzing was still a small village. When the Turks advanced, Hietzinger had to hide a valuable statue from her parish church in the crown of a large oak tree, and then sought refuge in nearby Vienna. Four young farmers had one day ventured into the deserted city. There, they were promptly taken prisoner by a Turkish patrol and tied to a tree: just at the tree where the statue was hidden. The four unfortunates had since begun to pray to the Mother of God, when their chains fell and a voice from the tree uttered the words: "Hiatz eng!" (Hütet Euch! or "Beware!"). In gratitude for the salvation of the four men, then the place was named after these cautionary words of the Mother of God; the passage of time had changed the name to "Hietzing".

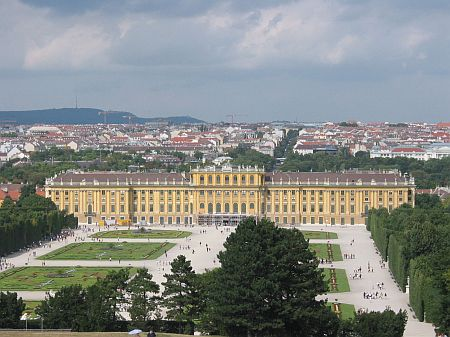
Schönbrunn Palace is located in Hietzing.

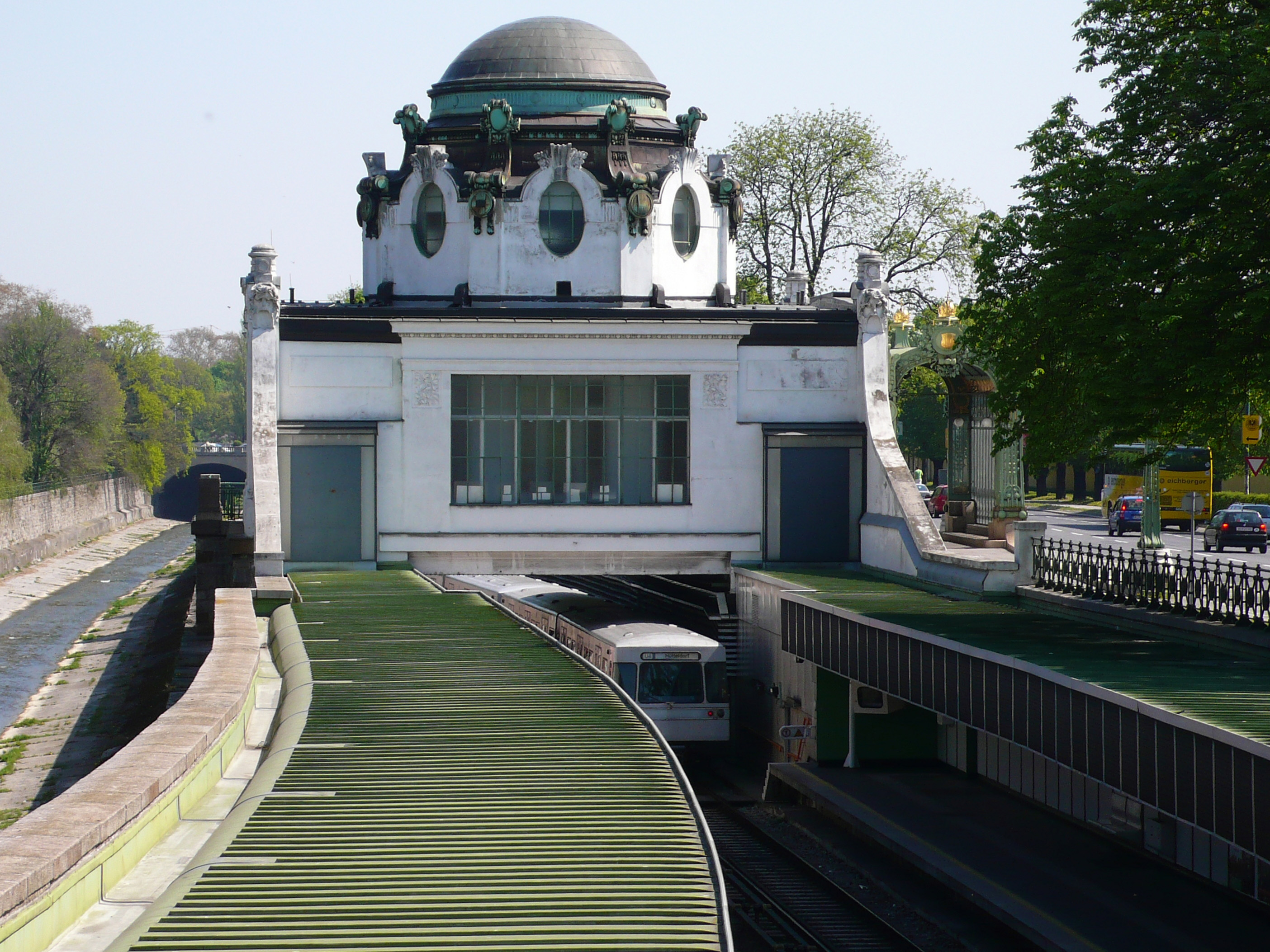
Stadtbahn-Hofpavillon of Hietzing (today U-Bahn train); Otto Wagner.

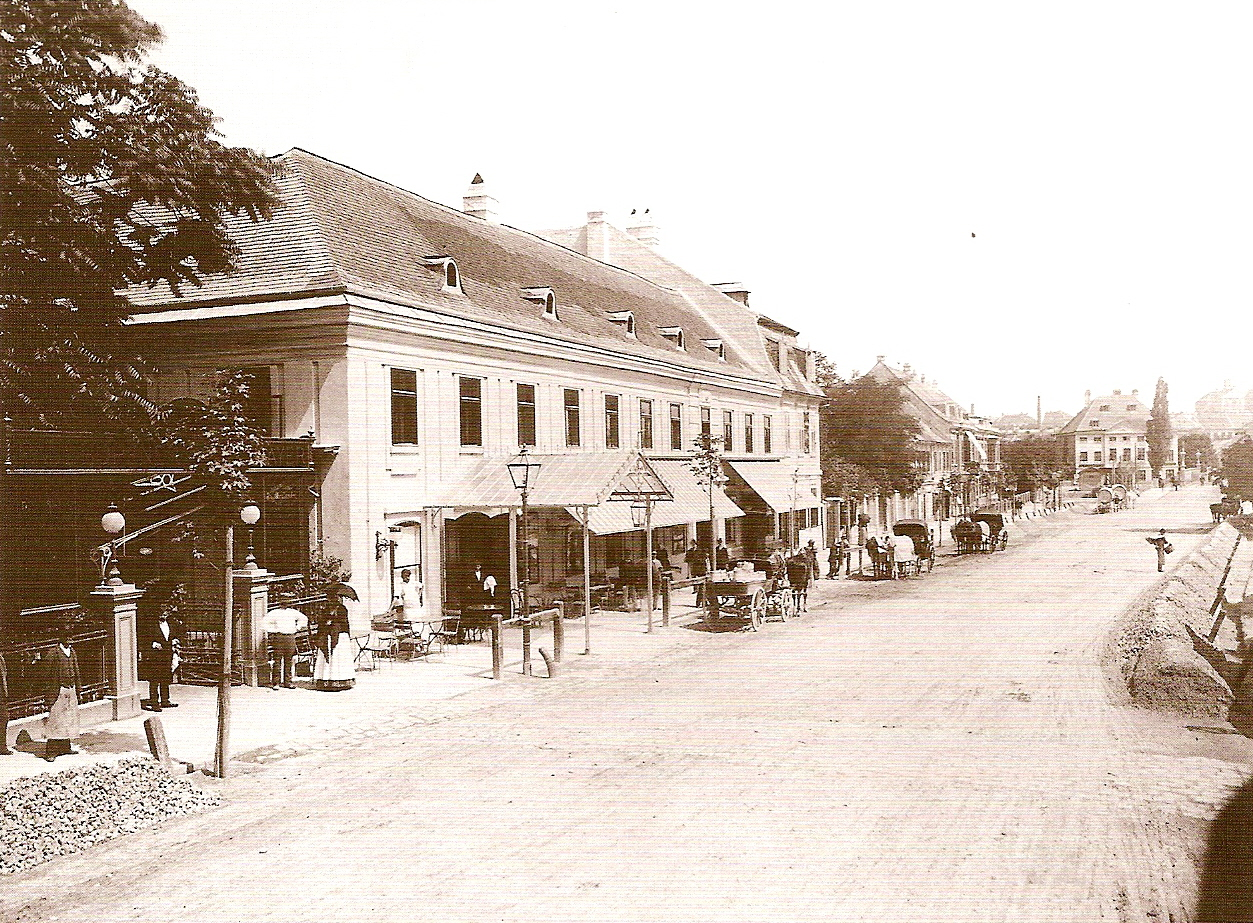
Hietzinger Main Street in 1889 at Kasinos Dommayer (current site of Parkhotel Schönbrunn).

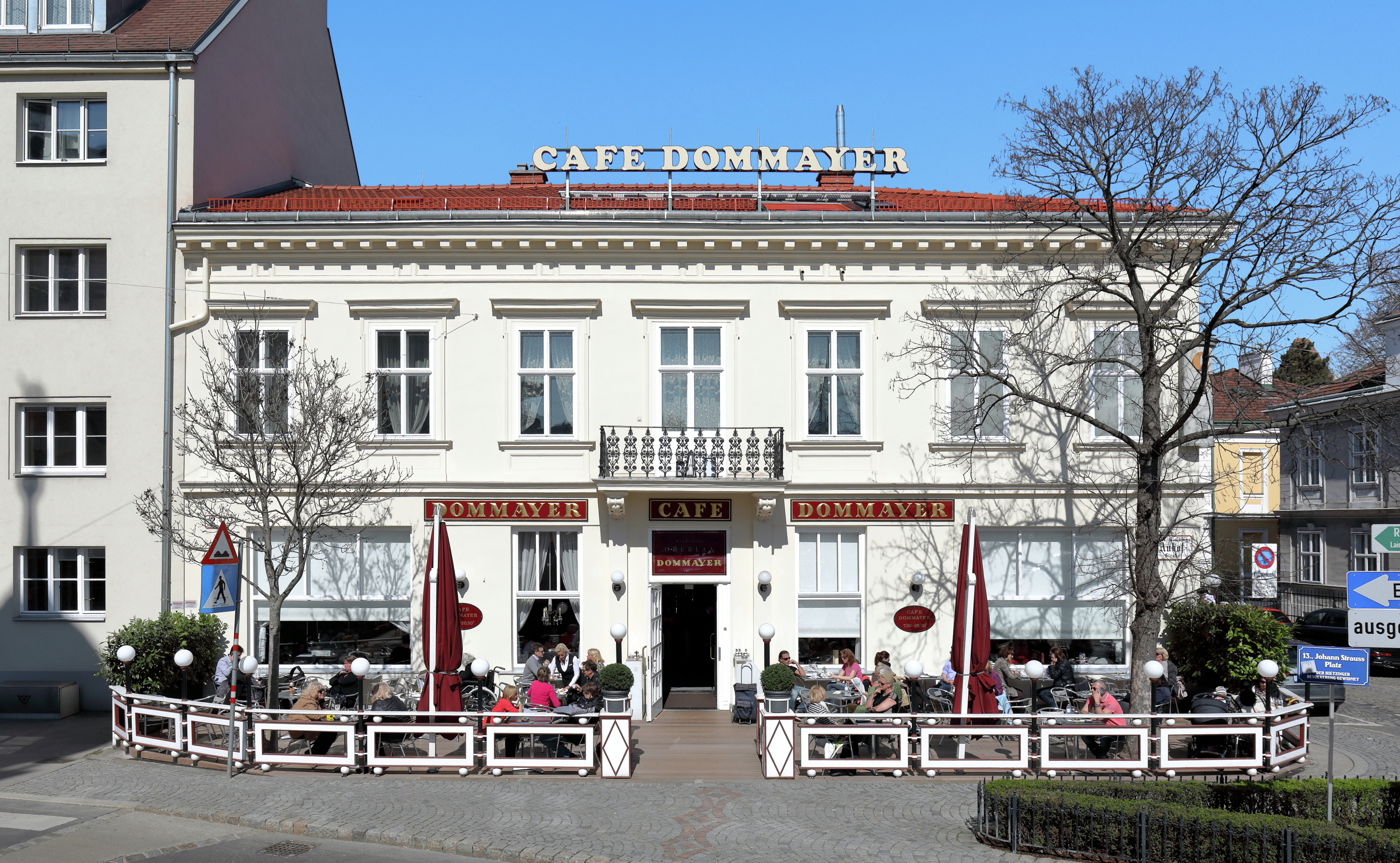
The Café Dommayer (today: corner of Auhofstraße / Anna-Strauß-Platz / Dommayergasse).

== Sights ==
Schönbrunn Castle housed the imperial apartments. In an adjoining building, there is the Wagenburg of the Kunsthistorisches Museum, which contains a collection of over 100 wagons, carriages, litters and sedan chairs, with its train and Reit-geschirren which have been used by the imperial court. The connected, not publicly available, uniform depot dates back to the livery-coat of Colonel squire Office and is one of the world's finest collections of court dress from the 19th and early 20th century. In the park are the Palm House, the Gloriette and the oldest existing zoo in the world, the Tiergarten Vienna Zoo.

In the old Towncenter of Hietzing:

- District Museum of Hietzing
- Café Dommayer
- Hietzinger Cemetery (graves of Franz Grillparzer, Otto Wagner, Gustav Klimt, Franz Conrad von Hötzendorf, Engelbert Dollfuß, Rudolf Prack, and Heinz Conrads)
- Hackinger Steg, a pedestrian bridge over the River Wien
- Kennedybrücke (Kennedy Bridge)
- ORF-Zentrum
- Schönbrunn Palace
- Palmenhaus Schönbrunn
- Hietzinger Cemetery (grave of Gustav Klimt, and Engelbert Dollfuss
- Tiergarten Schönbrunn
- Lainzer Tiergarten

== Notable residents ==
=== Hietzing ===
- Lothar Abel (1841–1896), architect (e.g. Palais Chotek, Vienna) (de)
- Paul Amann (1884–1958), writer, translator (de)
- Alban Berg (1885–1935), composer
- Elias Canetti (1905–1994), Bulgaria-born author and Nobel prize laureate
- Helene von Druskowitz (1856–1918), philosopher, feminist
- Heinz Fischer (born 1938), former President of Austria
- Leopold Fitzinger (1802–1884), zoologist
- Thomas Klestil (1932–2004), former President of Austria
- Karl Münichreiter (1891–1934), antifascist resistance fighter (de)
- Erwin Strahl (born 1929), actor (de)
- Johann Strauss II (1825–1899), composer
- Richard Tauber (1891-1948), tenor, composer and conductor
- Hedy Urach (1910–1943), Nazi-resistance (de)

=== Unter-St.-Veit (Unter Sankt Veit) ===
- Hildegard Burjan (1883–1933), social reformer, lived from 1925 to 1933 in Larochegasse
- Friedrich Cerha (born 1926), composer; Kupelwiesergasse
- Franz André Heller, a.k.a. André Heller (born 1947), artist, author, singer; Elßlergasse 9
- Josef Holaubek (1907–1999), legendary Vienna police chief, lived and died in Larochegasse 14 (de)
- Gustav Klimt (1862–1918), painter; Feldmühlgasse 11
- Adolf Loos (1870–1933), Moravian-born architect
- Hans Moser (1880–1964), actor; Auhofstraße 76–78
- Klaus Wildbolz (1937-2017), Swiss actor (de)
- Ludwig Wittgenstein (1889–1951), philosopher, resided in late 1919 in the villa of the Sjögren family; St.-Veit-Gasse 17

=== Ober-St.-Veit (Ober-Sankt Veit) ===
- Andreas Khol (born 1941), former President of Parliament
- Fritz Moravec (1922–1997), mountaineer, author
- Sir Karl Popper (1902–1994), philosopher
- Egon Schiele (1890–1918), early expressionist artist; Hietzinger Hauptstraße 101 and 114, buried at Ober-St.-Veiter Friedhof.
- Franz Schmidt (1874, Bratislava - 1939), composer of the Late Romantic, rector of the Akademie für Musik
- Wolfgang Schüssel (born 1945), former Chancellor of Austria (2000–07)
- Rudolf Slatin, Slatin Pascha (1857–1932), general in the Egyptian army, Major General in the British Army; Schweizertalstraße

== See also ==
- Allied-administered Austria - the Allied Occupation (1945–55)
