= Lothar Abel =

German Garden architect

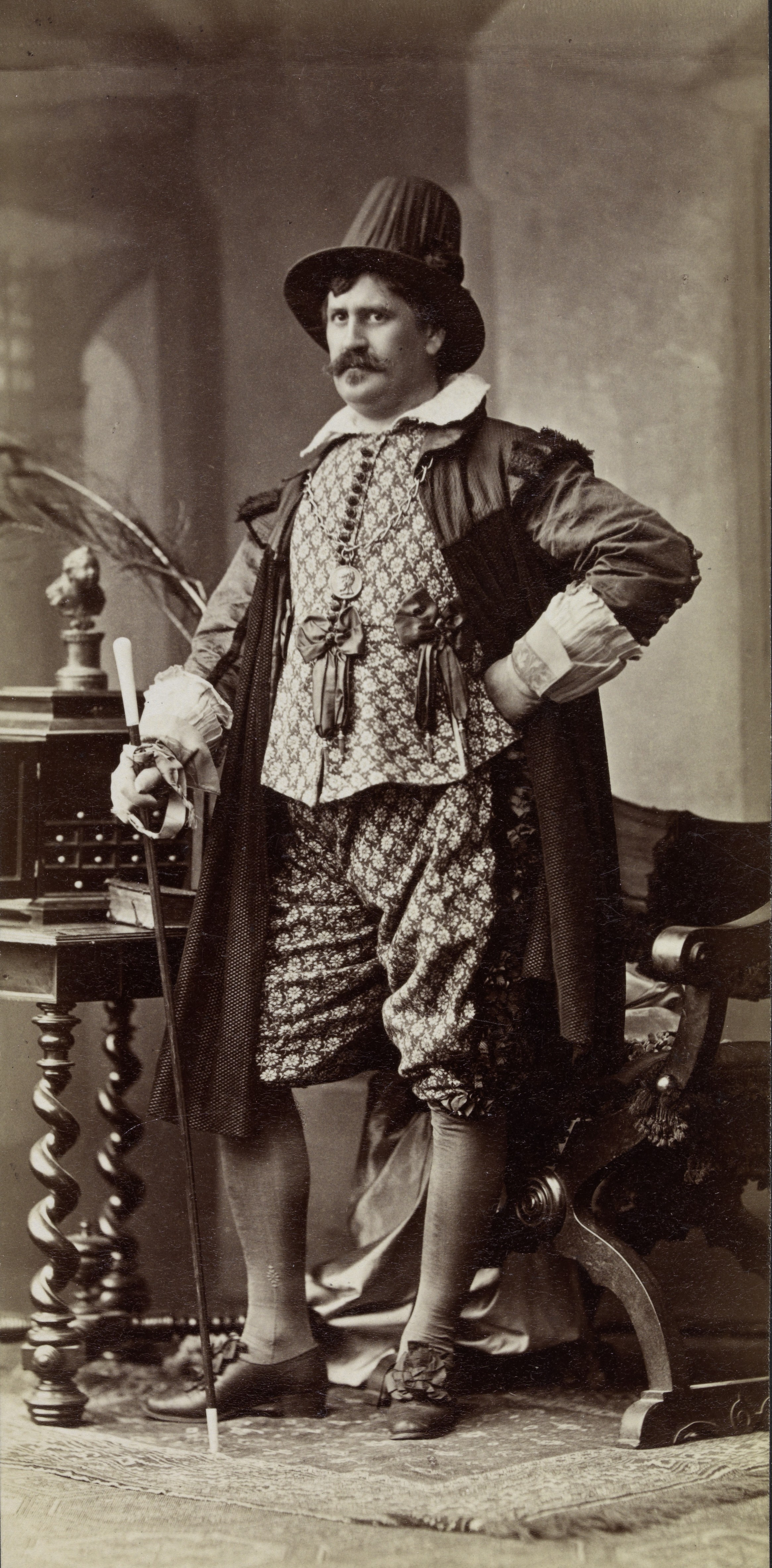
- Abel in costume for the Makart-Festzug, Victor Angerer, 1879
- Born: Lothar Paul Abel; 15 February 1841; Hietzing, Vienna, Austria
- Died: 24 June 1896 (aged 55); Vienna, Austria

Lothar Paul Abel (15 February 1841 in Hietzing, Vienna – 24 June 1896 in Vienna) was an Austrian architect, and a lecturer at the University of Natural Resources and Life Sciences, Vienna.

== Life ==
Lothar Abel was the son of a commercial gardener, Ludwig Gottlieb Abel, and Josefa Abel, née Heller. He was born in Hietzing, a former suburb of Vienna now absorbed into a larger region of the same name. After leaving school, from 1857 to 1861 he studied architecture at the k.k. polytechnischen Institut, today's TU Wien. He then studied at the Academy of Fine Arts Vienna under Eduard van der Nüll, August Sicard von Sicardsburg and Carl Roesner. After completing his studies he carried out research trips to Belgium, Germany, England, France, Holland, Italy, and Turkey, during which he took an interest not only in architecture but also in park and garden landscaping.

From 1868 to 1896, Abel taught at the Austrian Gardening Society, which had been founded in 1827. From 1877 he was a lecturer at what later became the University of Natural Resources and Life Sciences, Vienna, for whom he designed an extensive glasshouse complex.

In 1873 he converted from Protestantism to Catholicism and married Mathilde Schneider (born 25 December 1854 in Vienna, died 7 February 1936), the daughter of Anton Schneider, who had founded the Grand Hotel Wien. One of their children was the palaeontologist and one of the founding fathers of paleobiology, Othenio Abel (1875–1946).

He wanted to make his Habilitation, a qualification required for full professorships in Austria, at the Academy of Fine Arts, and was prepared to forgo payment and a fixed position, but although the Academy supported his application in 1882, it was rejected by the ministry in 1884 for unknown reasons.

Abel died on 24 June 1896 in Vienna following a stroke.

== Work ==
Lothar Abel carried out numerous constructions and renovations of palaces, and built many villas and country houses in the Austro-Hungarian empire, but his heart lay in garden design and art, and he increasingly saw himself as a garden architect. Through his greenhouse buildings, he soon became one of the leading garden architects of Vienna.

Abel favoured an architectural understanding of garden design, drawing on the examples of the Renaissance and classical antiquity. He insisted on carefully-weighed proportions and symmetry, and the observance of rules; low groups of bushes aligned along axes accentuated treeless lawns, offering an unimpeded view of the buildings and their facades. As such, he was an opponent of the English landscape garden.

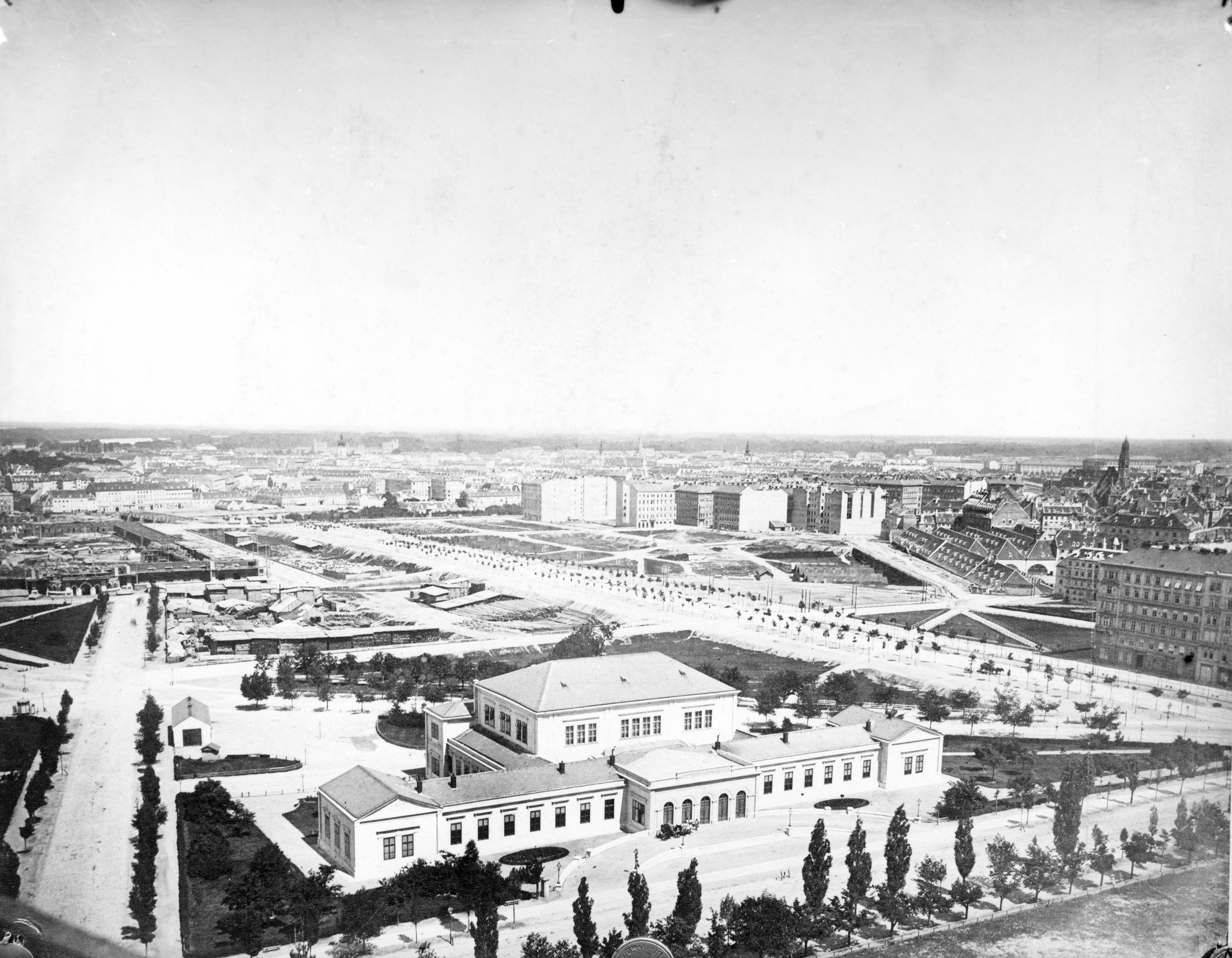
Proposed design for the House of Deputies

In 1861 he designed the park that was to lie behind the proposed House of Deputies in Währinger Straße, of which today nothing remains but the avenue in Kolingasse and the park at Schlickplatz. This was followed in 1872 by his first large work, the complete redesign of the Wurstelprater prior to the 1873 Vienna World's Fair. He eliminated the plan of the existing pleasure park that had developed since the 18th century, demolishing fairground stalls, widening and straightening the avenues, and driving out pedlars. He rebuilt the stalls to an orderly plan, which in the opinion of many Viennese destroyed the popular charm of the pleasure park.

Abel was the author of numerous works on the art and architecture of gardens, held lectures for the Austrian gardening society, and published technical notes in the Wiener Illustrirten Garten-Zeitung ("Vienna illustrated garden magazine").

Abel's output as an author on architecture was not confined to gardens; in 1894 he published "Das gesunde, behagliche und billige Wohnen", a guide-book to comfortable domestic architecture and planning, in which he advocated an informal approach to home design, covering such questions as the role of personal taste in domestic comfort, and the practicalities of ventilation, plumbing and good living.

== Selected gardens and buildings ==
- 1861: Park behind the proposed House of Deputies (Austria) in Währinger Straße, Vienna
- 1871–1874: Palais Chotek in Wien
- 1872: Prater renovations, new layout of the pleasure park prior to the 1873 Vienna World's Fair
- 1876: Greenhouses and botanical museum in the Botanical Garden of the University of Vienna
- 1878: Sigmund-Freud-Park (former Maximilianplatz, by the Votivkirche, Vienna)
- 1882: Square at the Getreidemarkt, Vienna
- 1883: Formal tombs and green spaces at the Vienna central cemetery
- 1884: Sparkassenpark-Stadtpark, St. Pölten, between Mühlbach / Eybnerstraße / Klostergasse / Westbahnallee
- 1888: Garden at Schloss Fürberg

== Selected publications ==
- Garten-Architektur with 198 illustrations, Vienna 1876
- Aesthetik der Garten-Kunst, Vienna 1877
- Die Baumpflanzungen in der Stadt und auf dem Lande, Vienna 1882
- Die Kunst in ihrer Anwendung auf den Grundbesitz. Eine Darstellung der wichtigsten Kunstregeln bei allen Verbesserungen und Verschönerungen der Landgüter, Vienna 1889
- Das elegante Wohnhaus. Eine Anleitung Wohnhäuser aussen und innen mit Geschmack zu erbauen und auszustatten, Vienna 1890
- Das kleine Haus mit Garten. Praktische Winke, Vienna 1893 ()
- Das gesunde, behagliche und billige Wohnen, Vienna 1894
- Die Praxis des Baumeisters, Vienna 1896

== Awards ==
- 1872: Knight's Cross of the Order of Franz Joseph
- 1876: Austrian medal for arts and sciences
- 1878: Bronze medal of the "Exposition Universelle de 1878"
- 1879: Gold medal of the Order of Adolphe of Nassau

== Appointments and memberships of societies ==
- 1864: Member of the Austrian society of engineers and architects
- 1868–91: Member of the society of fine artists, Vienna
- 1872: Appointed to the k.k. Central-Commission of the Vienna World Exhibition
- 1875: Member of the governing council of the k.k. Gartenbau-Gesellschaft
