= Hermesvilla =

Palace in the Lainzer Tiergarten in Vienna, Austria

Coordinates: 48.170681°N 16.246167°E

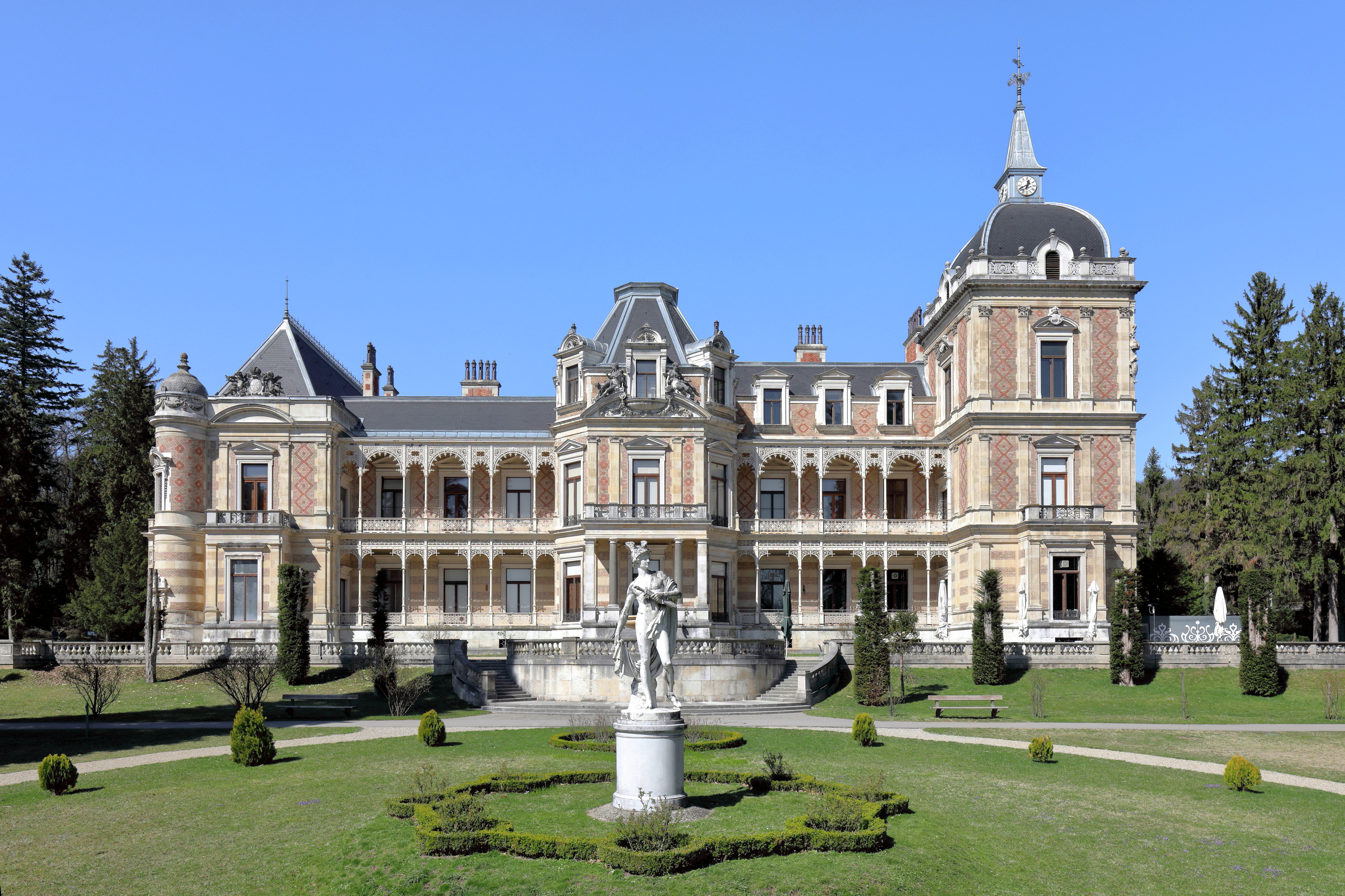
Hermesvilla

Hermesvilla is a palace in the Lainzer Tiergarten in Vienna, a former hunting area for the Habsburg nobility. Emperor Franz Joseph I gave it to his wife Empress Elisabeth (nicknamed "Sisi"), and he called it the "castle of dreams.“ The name of the villa refers to a statue of Hermes made of white marble that is located in the garden of the villa. Today, the Hermesvilla is noted for its art and natural setting, and is used by the Vienna Museum for special exhibitions on cultural history.

== History ==
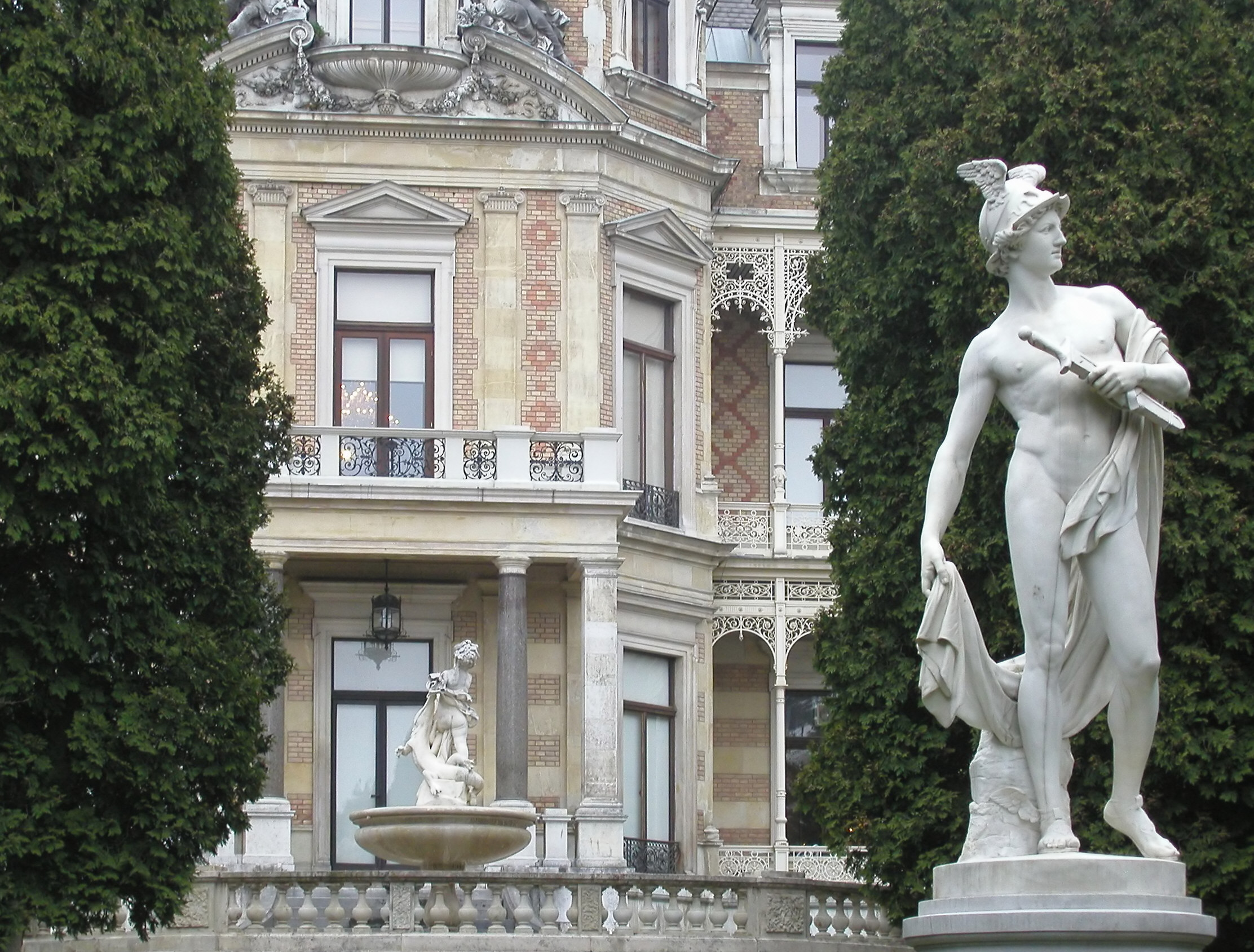
Hermés statue

Emperor Franz Joseph decided to build the Villa Hermés, originally called the "Villa Waldruh," in the summer of 1881. Ostensibly, the Emperor hoped it would encourage his wife, who traveled widely, to remain in Vienna. It was designed by architect Karl Freiherr von Hasenauer, and construction lasted 1882 until 1886. In 1885, the decision was made to rename the building "Villa Hermés". The Empress herself commissioned the sculptor Ernst Herter from Berlin to create the sculpture, titled Hermés der Wächter ("Hermés the Guardian") and instructed that it was to be placed in the garden of the villa. Documents at the Stadterweiterungsfond describe numerous stone deliveries of Sterzinger Marble, Laaser Marble and Wöllersdorfer Stone for staircases in the main building. Hard Mannersdorfer Stone, Almaser Stone, Lindabrunner Stone, St. Margarethener Stone, as well as "Kaiserstein" from "Kaisersteinbruch" were used in surrounding buildings.

In 1886, the villa, and all surrounding buildings, including riding facilities and stables for the horses of Empress Elisabeth, were finished. From 1887 until her assassination in 1898, the imperial couple regularly spent time there every year in late spring, varying from a few days to a couple of weeks.

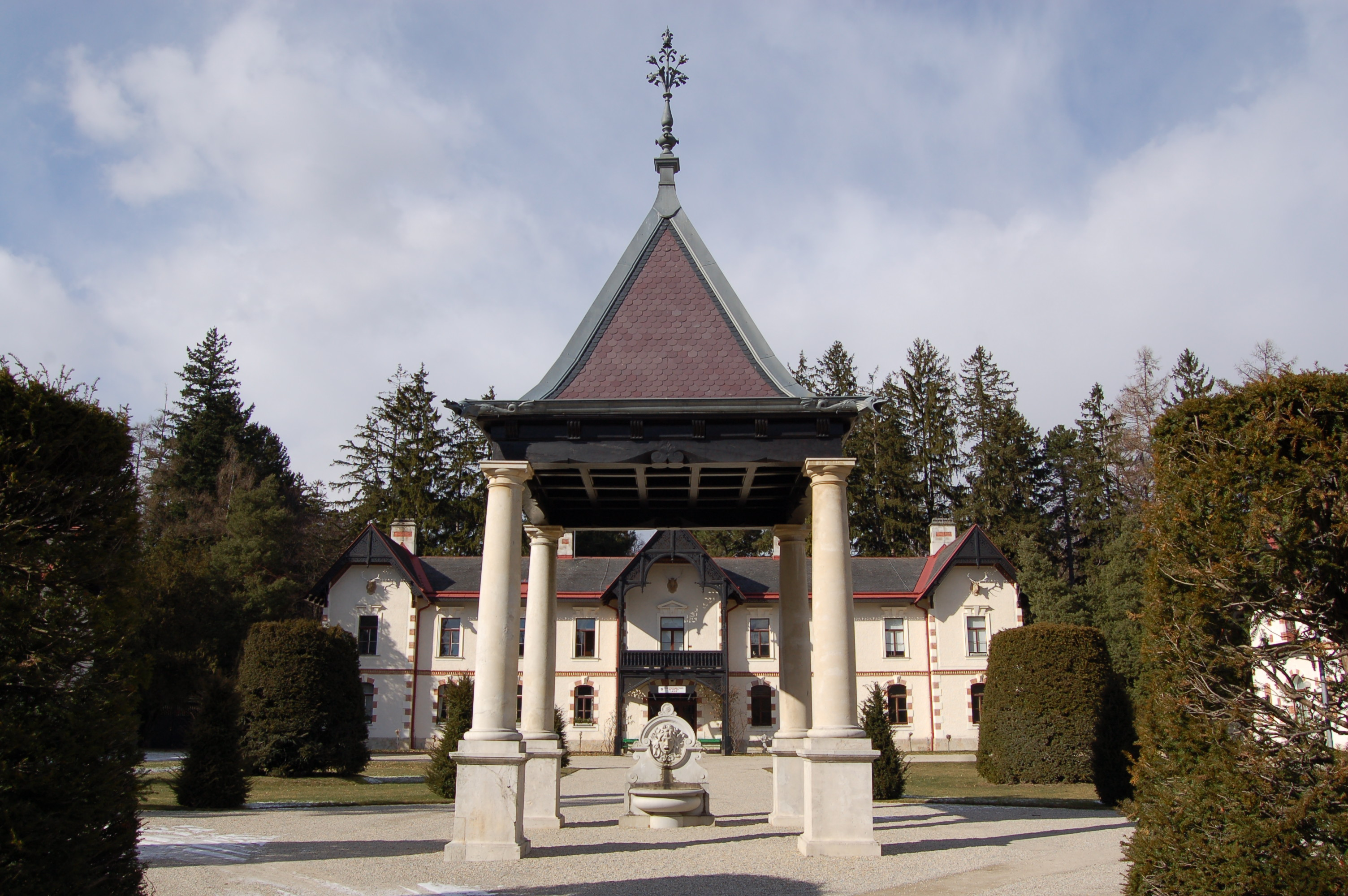
Fountain in the courtyard of the Villa

In developing the grounds, Emperor Franz Joseph ordered that care be taken to flatten all the meadows and remove all molehills, expressing concern that otherwise the Empress "could not hack her horses" there. At a small pond nearby, a gazebo was built for the Empress, though it is no longer there today. The street leading to the Villa was one of the first streets in Vienna with electric lighting, and the Villa was one of the first buildings in Vienna with a telephone connection.

During the post-WWII Russian occupation of Vienna from 1945 to 1955, the Villa was looted by the Soviets, became run down and remained in poor condition for a number of years. However, in 1963, the Disney movie "Miracle of the White Stallions" brought back the interest in the building. This led to a private initiative that motivated the Austrian authorities to renovate the Villa, and the renovation process lasted from 1968 until 1974. The first exhibition opened in 1971 as Austria's contribution to the "World Hunt Exhibition" in Budapest. Since then the Hermesvilla has become a "jewel" in the heart of the 2500 hectare nature reserve and is a popular destination, particularly for people interested in Habsburg culture, history, and the "Sisi Myth" of the beautiful and unhappy Empress who had met a tragic fate

== Interior ==
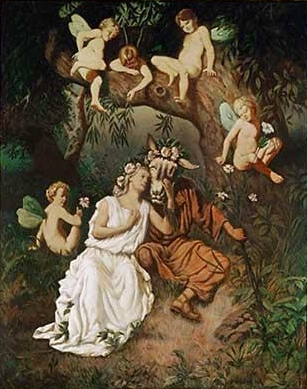
Murals in the bedroom of the Empress depict scenes from A Midsummer Night's Dream

Murals by Hans Makart, Gustav Klimt and Victor Tilgner are an integral part of the interior design. On the first floor are the private rooms of the Empress. The body conscious, possibly anorexic "Empress Sisi" worked out every day in the "Turnzimmer" (gymnasium). The room was originally equipped with a balance beam, Chin-up bar for pull-ups and rings. It also contains murals in the Pompeian style by August Eisenmenger, Hugo Charlemont and Adolf Falkensteiner, showing various sports.

Behind the Empress' dressing room is the bedroom of the Empress. In contrast to other rooms, here numerous historic objects have been preserved, including a gigantic baroque "state bed", dating to the time of Maria Theresa that once stood in the imperial room of the postal station in Strengberg near Amstetten in Lower Austria. The murals in the bedroom are based on motifs from Shakespeare's "A Midsummer Night's Dream" and were done by Hans Makart. From the bedroom, a spiral staircase leads to the ground floor and in the garden. In the salon hangs the restored painting "The Spring“ by Franz Matsch, Gustav Klimt and Georg Klimt.

In front of the palace stands the sculpture "Elisabeth" by Ulrike Truger. In this statue, commissioned in 1998, installed in the Lainzer Tiergarten in 2001, and moved to the Hermesvilla in 2006, the artist used the a central theme of "duty - escape - freedom“ (zwang – flucht – freiheit), reflecting the Empress' inner feelings. It is made of Carrara marble, stands about 2.5 metres (8.2 ft) high, and weighs 6.5 tonnes. Truger wanted the work to counter a romanticized "Sisi" stereotype. The statue presents the Empress differently from each side, standing for different aspects within the personality of the Empress, who chafed under the restrictions of court life: One side, "duty/obligation" (zwang) expresses the duty and obligations of her expected role. The next, "escape" (flucht ) expresses her desire to flee; and finally the theme "freedom" (freiheit) is expressed with an image that includes wings. Thus, Truger's interpretation of the Empress explores the interplay between structure and freedom.

== Stables ==
The stables, originally built for the horses of the Empress, are located in the left wing of the courtyard. The original stable equipment, including the wall partitions for the box stalls and tie stalls, still exist today to a large extent. Between the horse stalls is a Rondeau, a perfectly circular round pen of 20 metres (66 ft) diameter in which the horses of the Empress were longed during bad weather. From the 1950s until 2005 these stables were used as a summer stable for the Lipizzan stallions of the Spanish Riding School. For seven weeks the stallions were given holidays at this location, where their riders gave them a change in routine from their usual work, taking them out hacking in the nearby forests of the "Tiergarten".

== Gallery ==
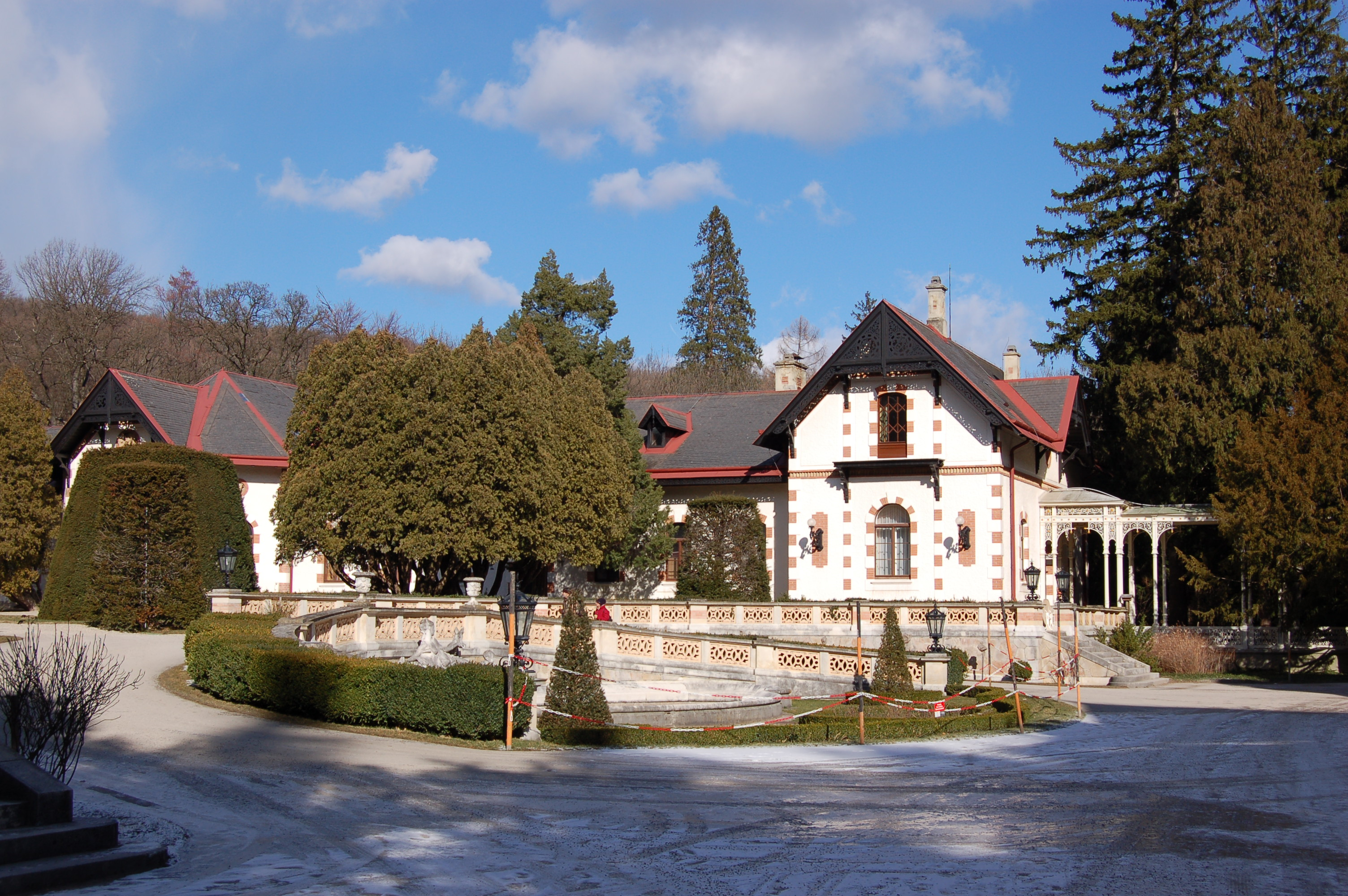
Hermesvilla Hof

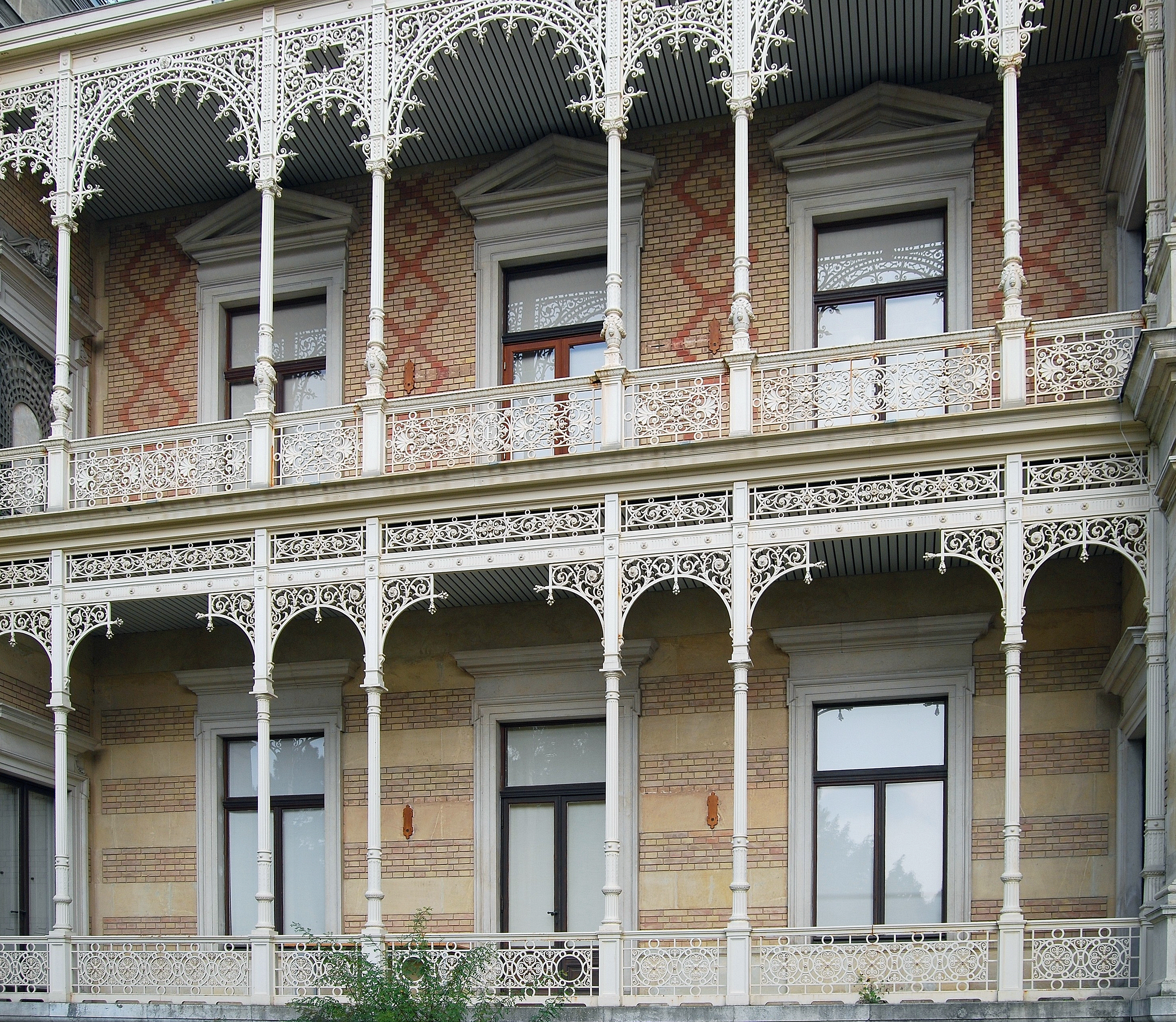
Hermesvilla

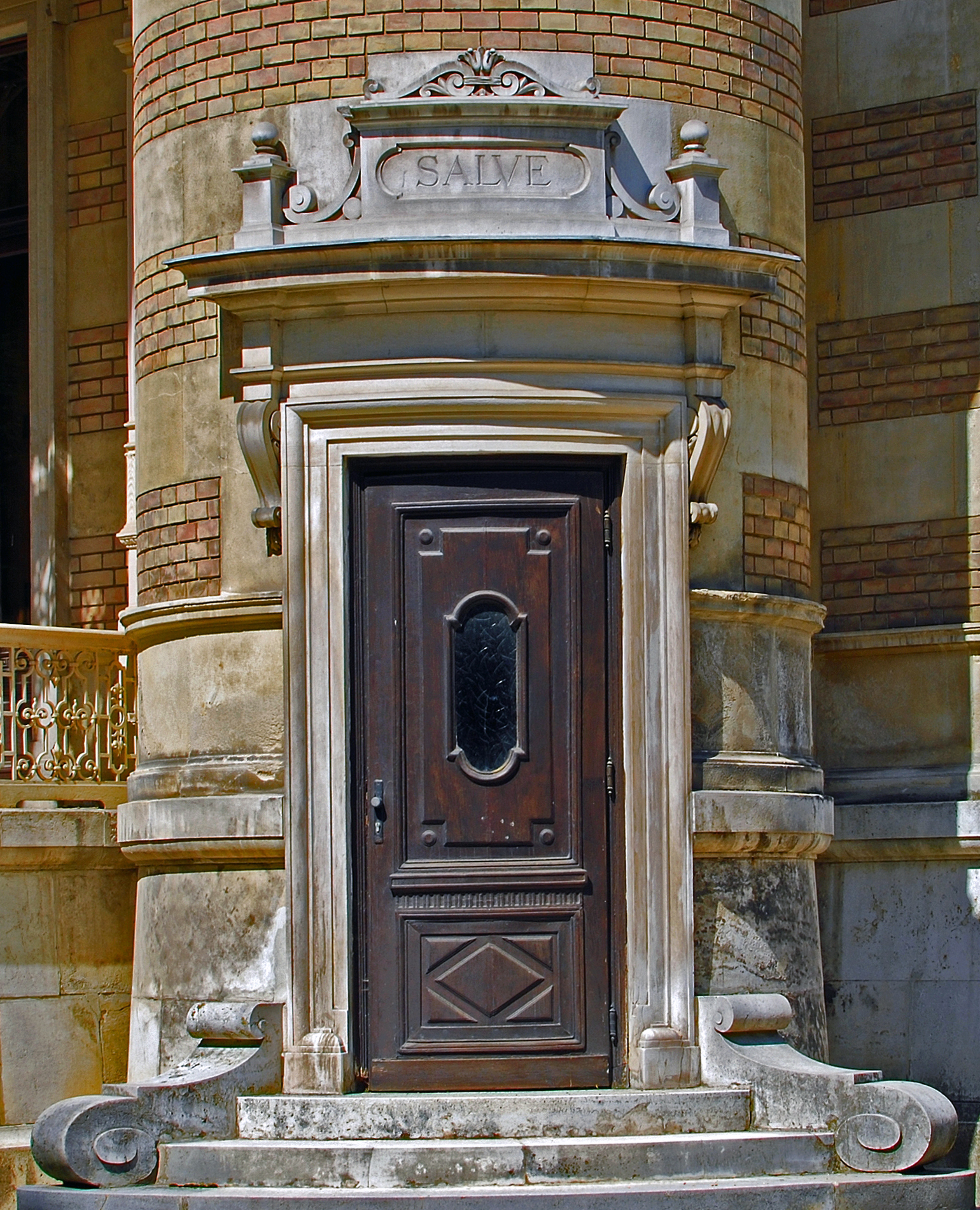
Hermesvilla

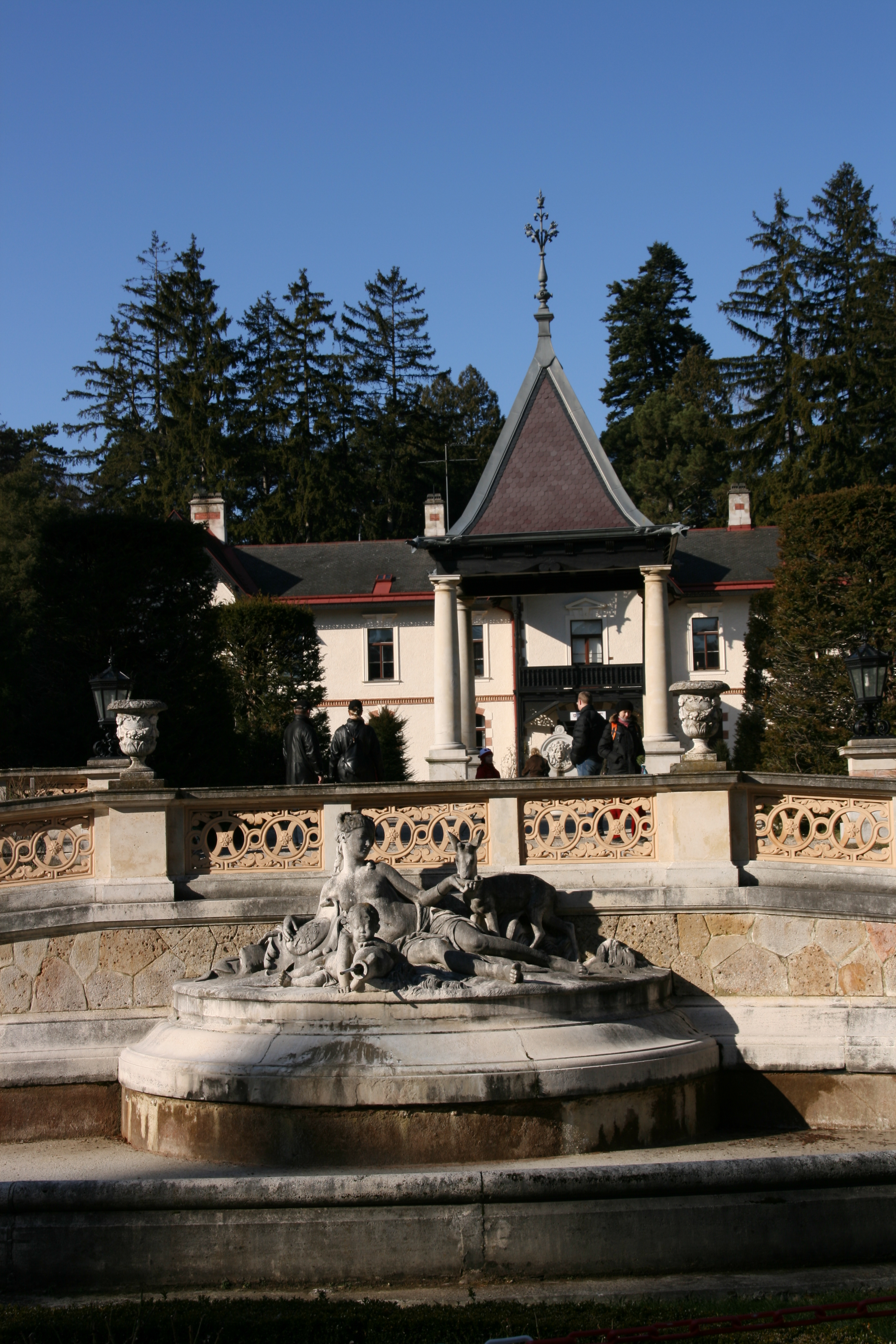
Tilgnerbrunnen fountain

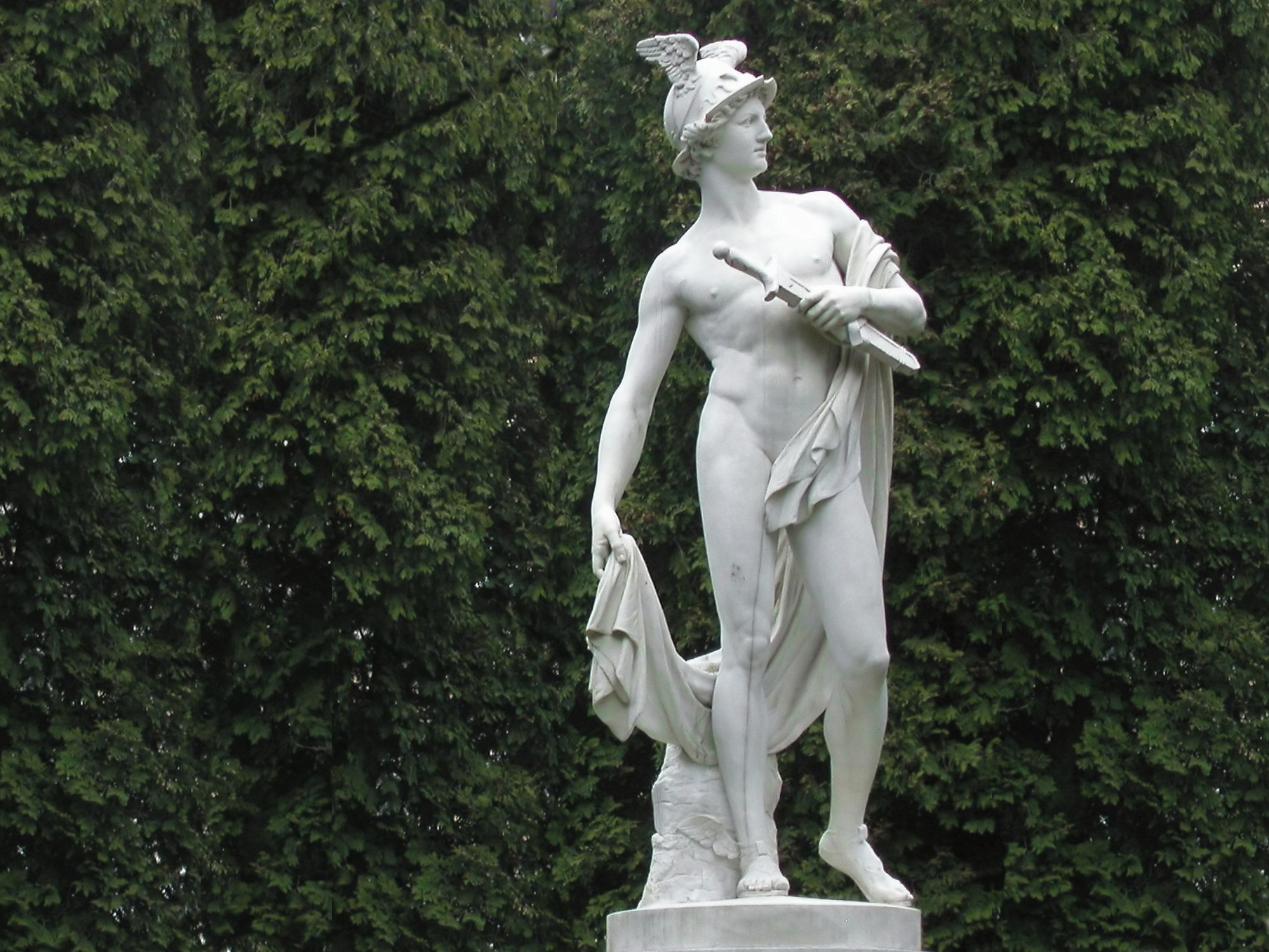
Hermesvilla statue

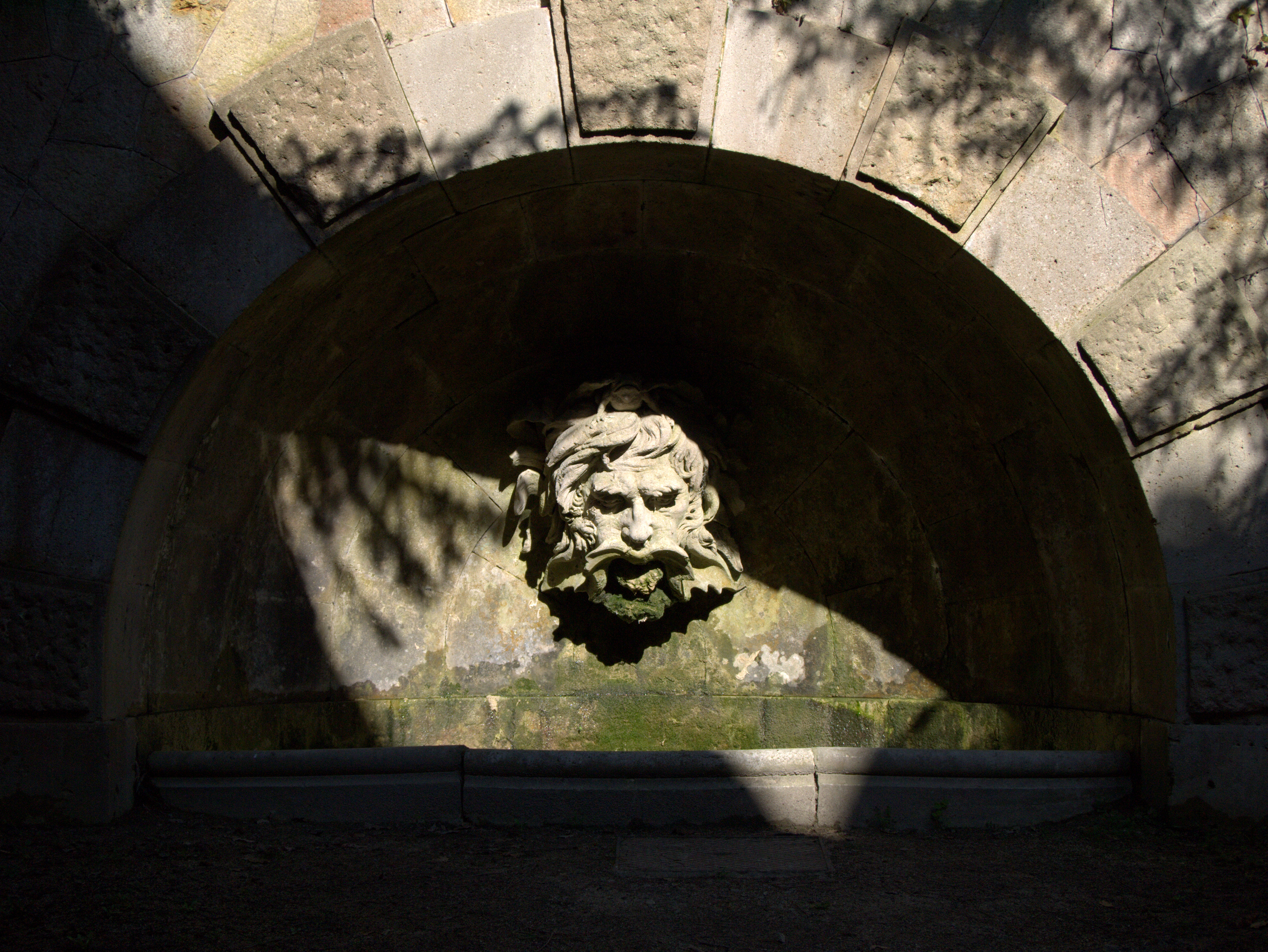
Hintererbrunnen fountain

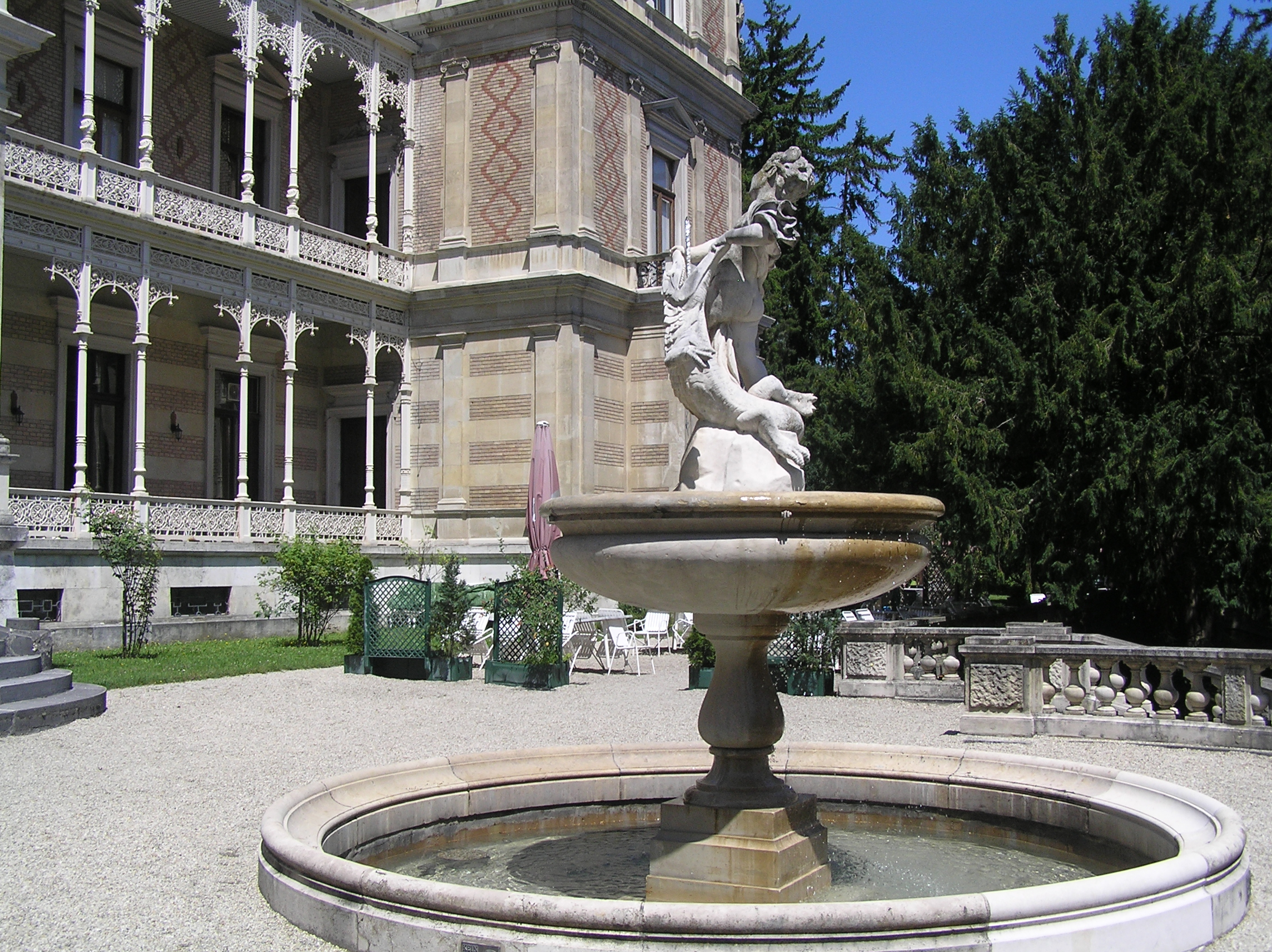
Hermesbrunnen fountain
