= Lainzer Tiergarten =

Wildlife preserve in Austria

Coordinates: 48°10′45″N 16°12′26″E

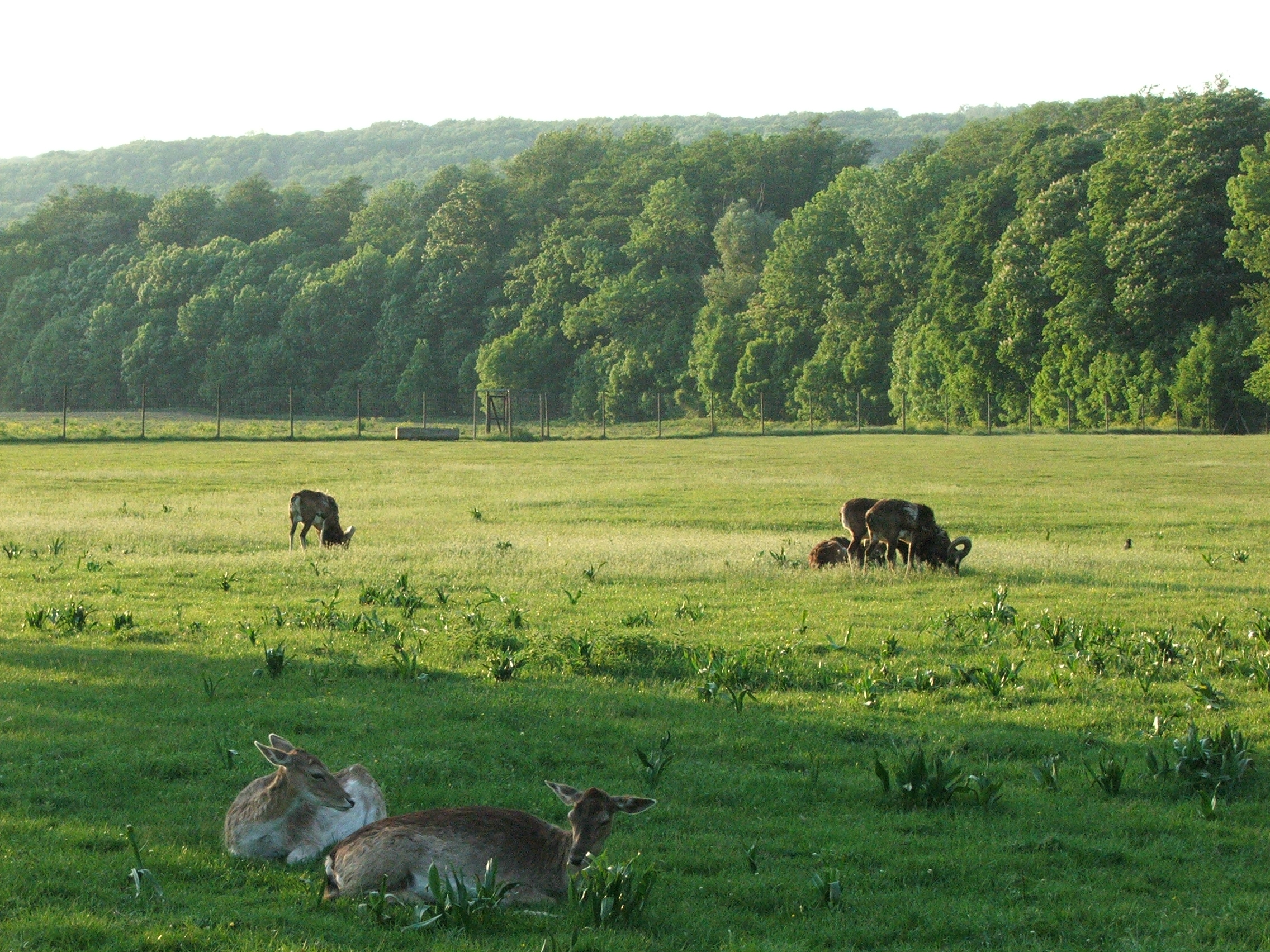
A meadow near to the main gate

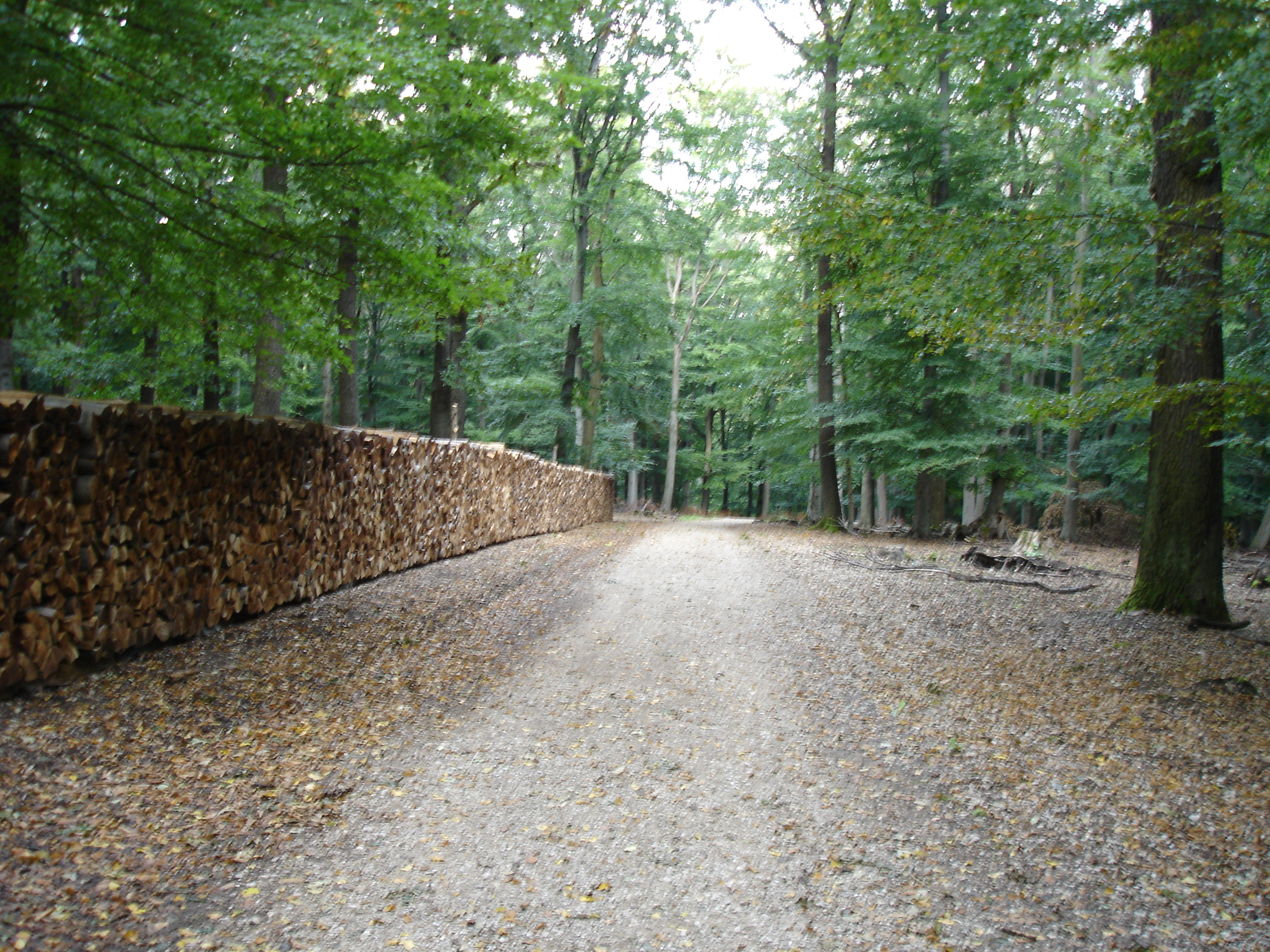
A path in the Lainzer Tiergarten

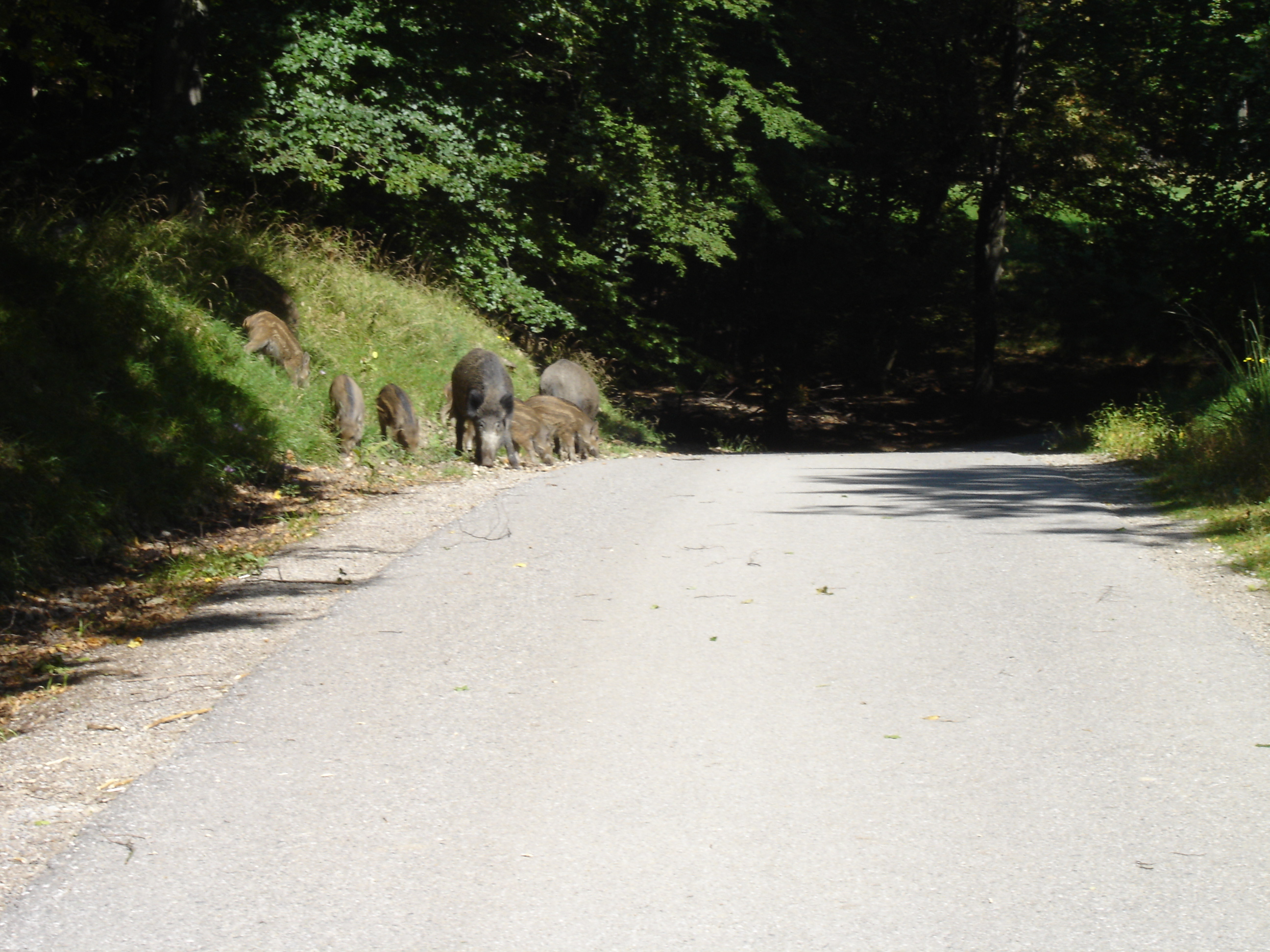
Wild boars on a path in the Lainzer Tiergarten

The Lainzer Tiergarten (Austrian German pronunciation: [ˈlaɪntsɐ ˈtiːɐ̯ˌɡartn̩], lit. 'Lainz Animal Garden') is a 24.50 km^{2} (6,054-acre) wildlife preserve in the southwest corner of Vienna, Austria, 80% of it being covered in woodland. It dates back to 1561, when Ferdinand I created it as a fenced-in hunting ground for his family to use. Since 1919, it has been open to the public. Its name consists of its location by the Lainz district of Vienna's 13th District, and Tiergarten, which means zoo (literally, "animal garden").

== Location ==
The Lainzer Tiergarten is located mostly in Vienna's 13th district, with a small adjacent portion lying in Laab im Walde, Lower Austria. The Wien River is located to its north, the Liesingbach to its south.

== History ==
Emperor Ferdinand I created the Lainzer Tiergarten in 1561. He had wooden fence built to enclose an area that he could use as a private hunting preserve. In 1781, a stone wall replaced the wooden fence. After the fall of the Austro-Hungarian Empire, the Austrian government declared the grounds a public nature preserve, though between 1940 and 1955, the entire grounds were closed to the public. Until 1973 access to the preserve required the payment of an admission fee. Since then admission is free.

A large portion of the Lainzer Tiergarten was lost after World War I, when the Friedenstadt ("Peace City") neighborhood was constructed in its eastern portion. The old wall can still be seen in the Hörndlwald woods east of the Lainzer Tor.

Construction of the Westautobahn in the 1960s took a corner in the northwest of the preserve. This time there was compensation, however, as a portion of the Laaber Wald, adjacent to the southwest corner, was annexed.

== Wildlife ==
Today the Lainzer Tiergarten is home to between 800 and 1,000 wild boar, 200 to 250 fallow deer, approximately 700 European mouflons, and 80 to 100 red deer (elk).

== Gates ==
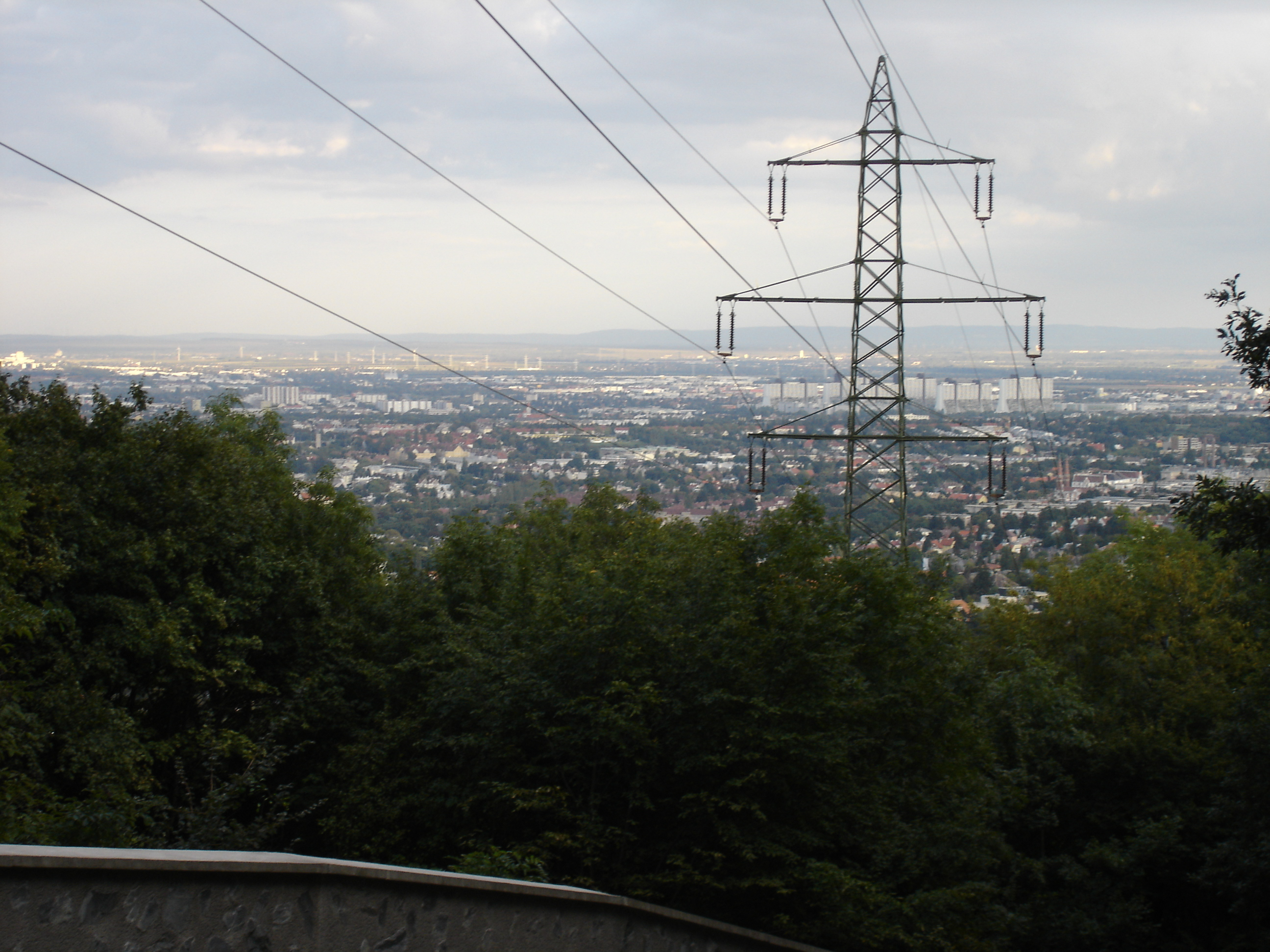
This view of Vienna from the preserve shows the wall in the bottom foreground.

The preserve is surrounded by approximately 22 kilometers (14 mi) of wall. There are seven gates, with different operating hours. Clockwise these are:

- Lainzer Tor (main gate)
- Gütenbachtor
- Laaber Tor
- Pulverstampftor
- Nikolaitor
- Sankt Veiter Tor

The entire preserve is open for approximately nine months of the year, from early March to early November. In the remaining months only the park around the Hermesvilla, accessible from the Lainzer Tor, is open. Between Christmas and the New Year, the entire park opens, but is only accessible from the Lainzer Tor and Nikolaitor.

=== Lainzer Tor ===
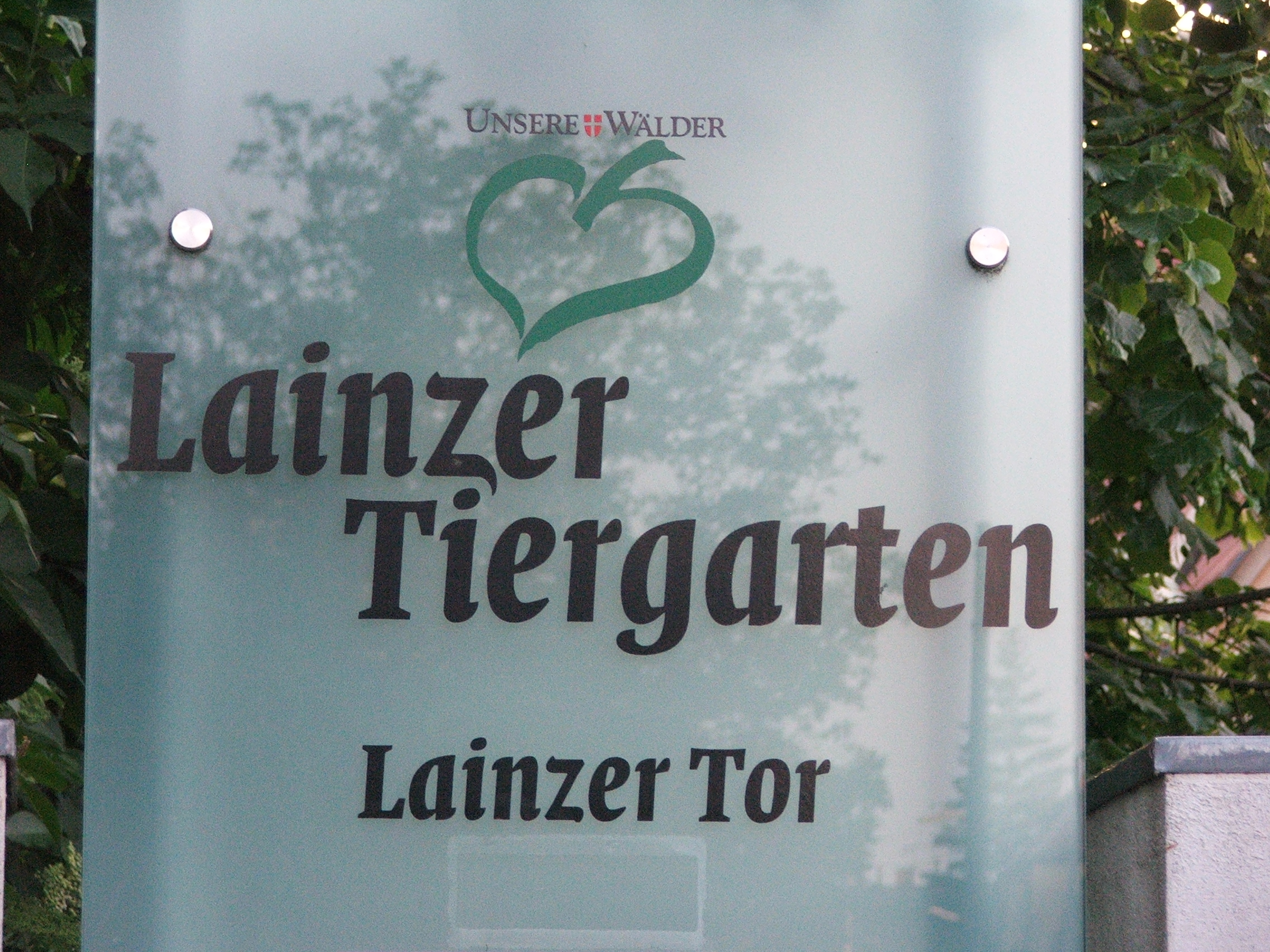
The Lainzer Tor

As it is open year-round, and is home to a visitor center, the Lainzer Tor is the preserve's main gate. It is also the origin and the terminus of a 2.2 km (1.4 mi) walk to the Hermesvilla, which can often also be ridden via horse carriage. Public restrooms are also located near the gate, as is a water fountain. This is also one of two gates that has a parking lot.

The Lainzer Tor is located at the end of Hermesstraße, and is reachable using the 56B bus, which connects the gate to the 60 and 62 tram line and to the U4 U-Bahn line (Hietzing station) at 15- to 20-minute intervals. These tram lines can be taken from the stop Speising, Hermesstraße, and connect to multiple U-Bahn and S-Bahn lines. Line 62 can also be taken directly from the Vienna Staatsoper to Hermesstraße.

=== Gütenbachtor ===
The Gütenbachtor is located on Gütenbachstraße, and accesses the southeastern corner of the Lainzer Tiergarten. It also features a water fountain and a parking lot, but is a 45-minute walk from the nearest public transportation, regional bus lines 253 and 254.

=== Laaber Tor ===
The Laaber Tor is located by the Lower Austrian town of Laab im Walde. It accesses a separate corner of the Lainzer Tiergarten that was added in the 1960s as a compensation for territory that was lost in the north of the preserve when a highway was built. Visitors using this gate will pass the Dianator, which was the gate in this corner before the annexation of additional land. The Laaber Tor also has a water fountain.

Similar to the Gütenbachtor, the only public transportation within reach is the regional bus line 253, which is a 15-minute walk from this gate.

=== Pulverstampftor ===
The Pulverstampftor is located in the northwest corner of the preserve, near the Auhof neighborhood of Vienna's 14th district. It features a water fountain, and can be accessed from the Umspannwerk Auhof stop of the bus line 50B from Hütteldorf (five-minute walk).

=== Nikolaitor ===
Due to its location near the Hütteldorf railway station, the Nikolaitor is an important gate of the Lainzer Tiergarten. Hütteldorf can be accessed with the U-Bahn U4, S-Bahn S45, S50 and S80, tram line 49, as well as multiple bus lines. From the station it is a 10-minute walk across the Wien River to Nikolaigasse. This gate also features a water fountain.

=== Adolfstor ===
The Adolfstor was located along the eastern wall of the Lainzer Tiergarten. It is now closed.

=== Sankt Veiter Tor ===
The Sankt Veiter Tor is directly accessible using a special hourly-served branch of the 54A bus line from the Ober Sankt Veit U-Bahn station. Higher-frequented bus lines to Ober St. Veit and the terminus of the 62 tram line, Lainz Wolkersbergenstraße, are available by walking down Hanschweg to Stock im Weg.

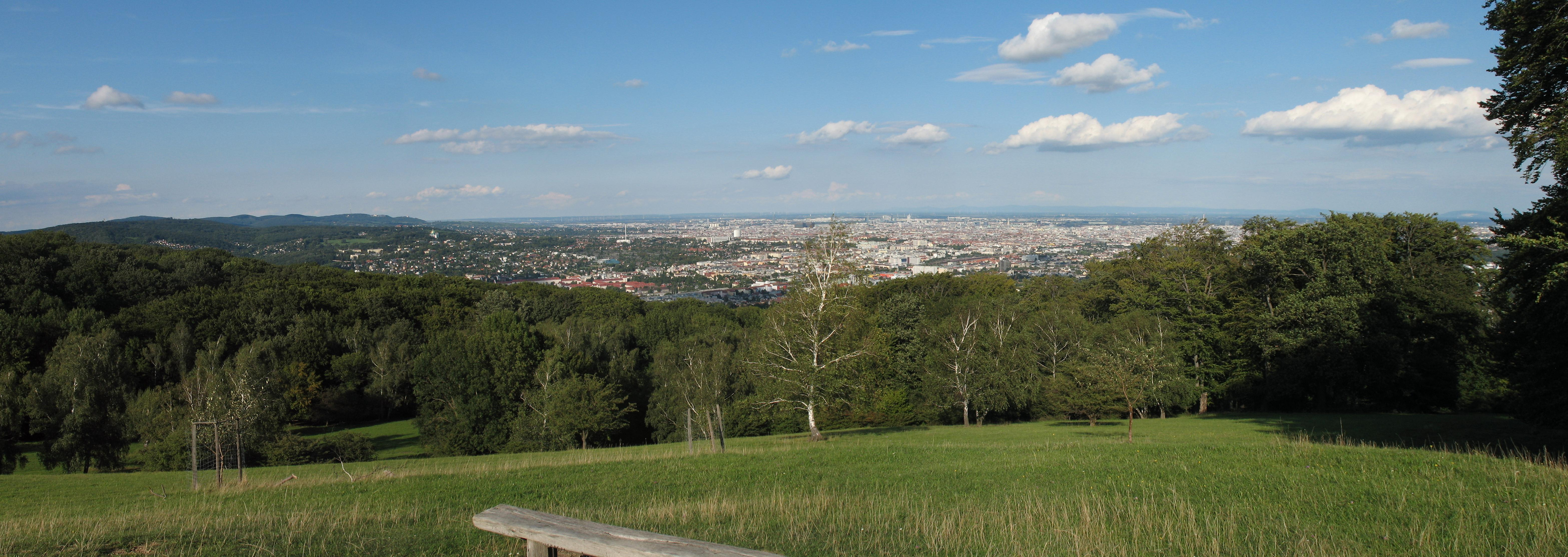
Viewpoint „Wiener Blick“

== Locations in the preserve ==
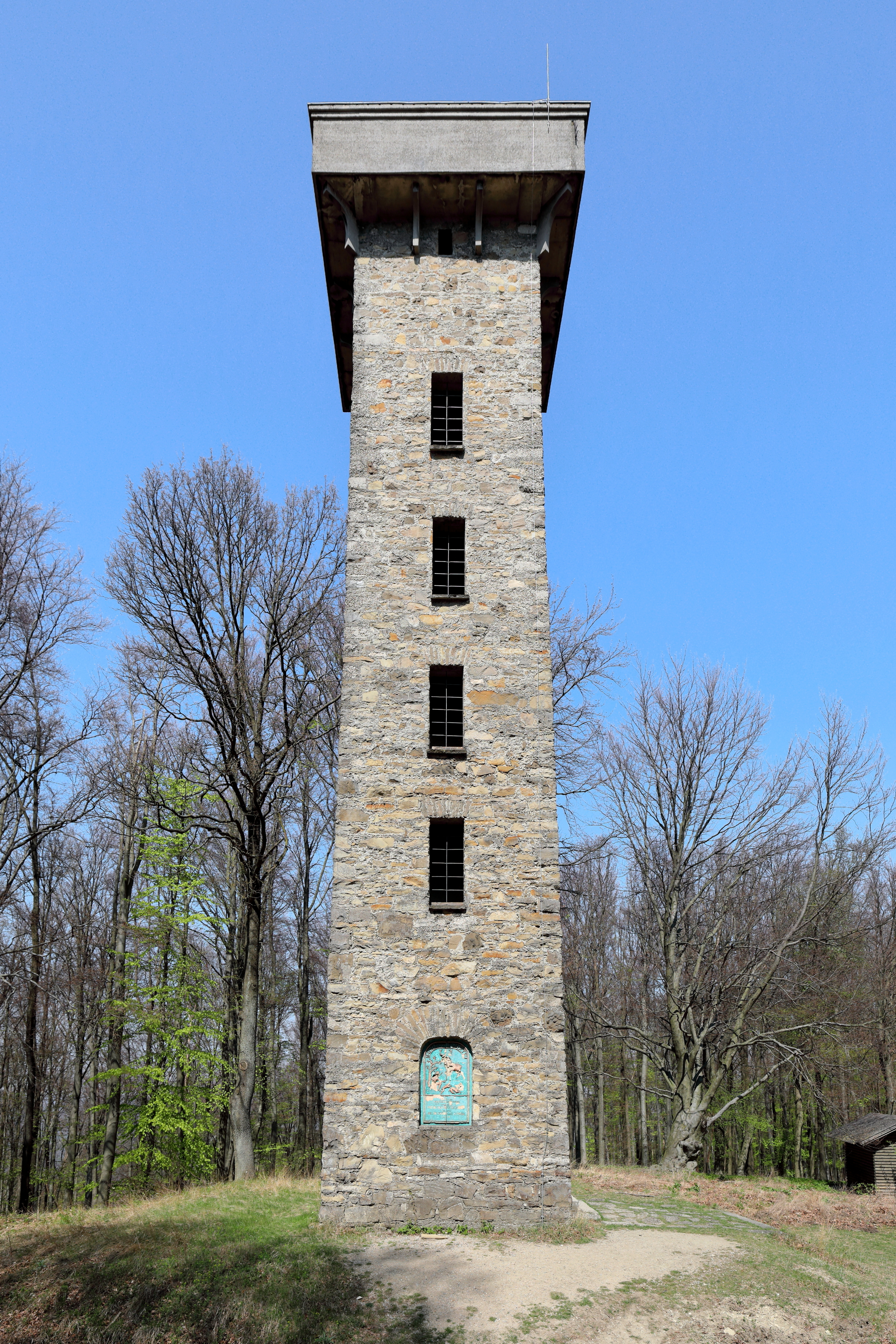
The Hubertuswarte

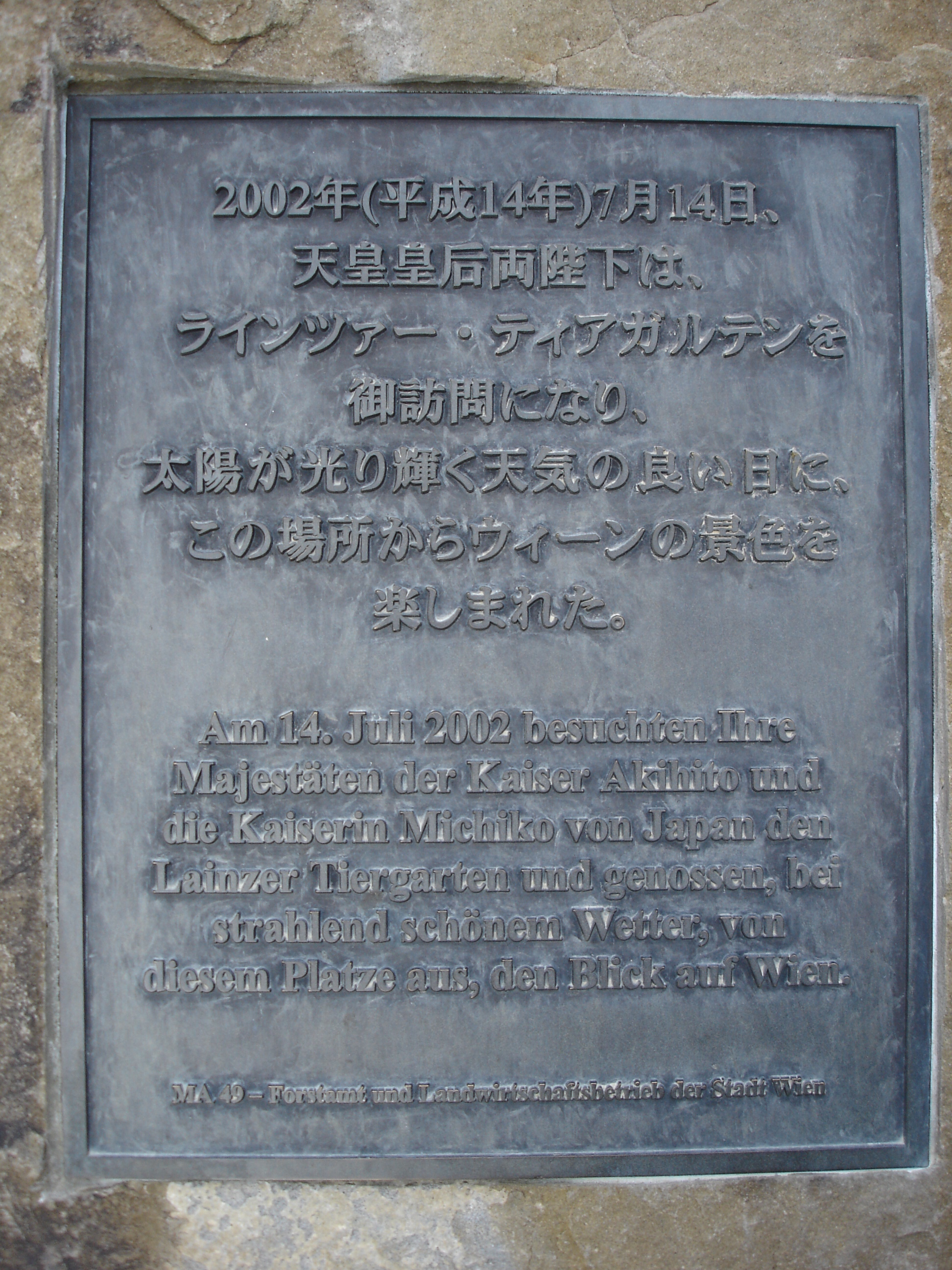
Plaque commemorating the visit of the Japanese Imperial Couple in 2002

There are three restaurants, two scenic viewpoints, a lake (Hohenauer Teich) and one museum located within the Lainzer Tiergarten.

=== Hermesvilla and park ===
Franz Joseph I of Austria commissioned the construction of the Hermesvilla, which was completed in 1886, and served as a getaway mansion for his wife. Today it serves as a museum and also contains a restaurant and café, which is highly frequented due to its close location to the Lainzer Tor. The property around the Hermesvilla is a special area of the Lainzer Tiergarten, fenced off from the rest of the preserve. Separate gates on the paths leading deeper into the park allow access to the larger section when this is open.

=== Hirschgstemm and Rohrhaus ===
Besides the Hermesvilla, visitors to the Lainzer Tiergarten can also eat and drink at the Hirschgstemm and Rohrhaus restaurants. These are located deeper in the reserve than the Hermesvilla, but also have full menus.

=== Hubertuswarte ===
The Hubertuswarte is an observation tower, built in 1927, and located on the Kaltbründel Berg, the highest point in the preserve (508 meters/1667 ft). From the top of the tower, visitors have a 360-degree view of the region, including Vienna and neighboring villages.

=== Wiener Blick ===
Closer to the city side of the Lainzer Tiergarten, the Wiener Blick offers a view of the city from 434 m (1424 ft). In July 2002, this observation point was visited by the Japanese Emperor Akihito and his wife Michiko.
