= Palais Chotek =

Neo-Renaissance palace in Vienna, Austria

Coordinates: 48°13′08″N 16°21′29″E

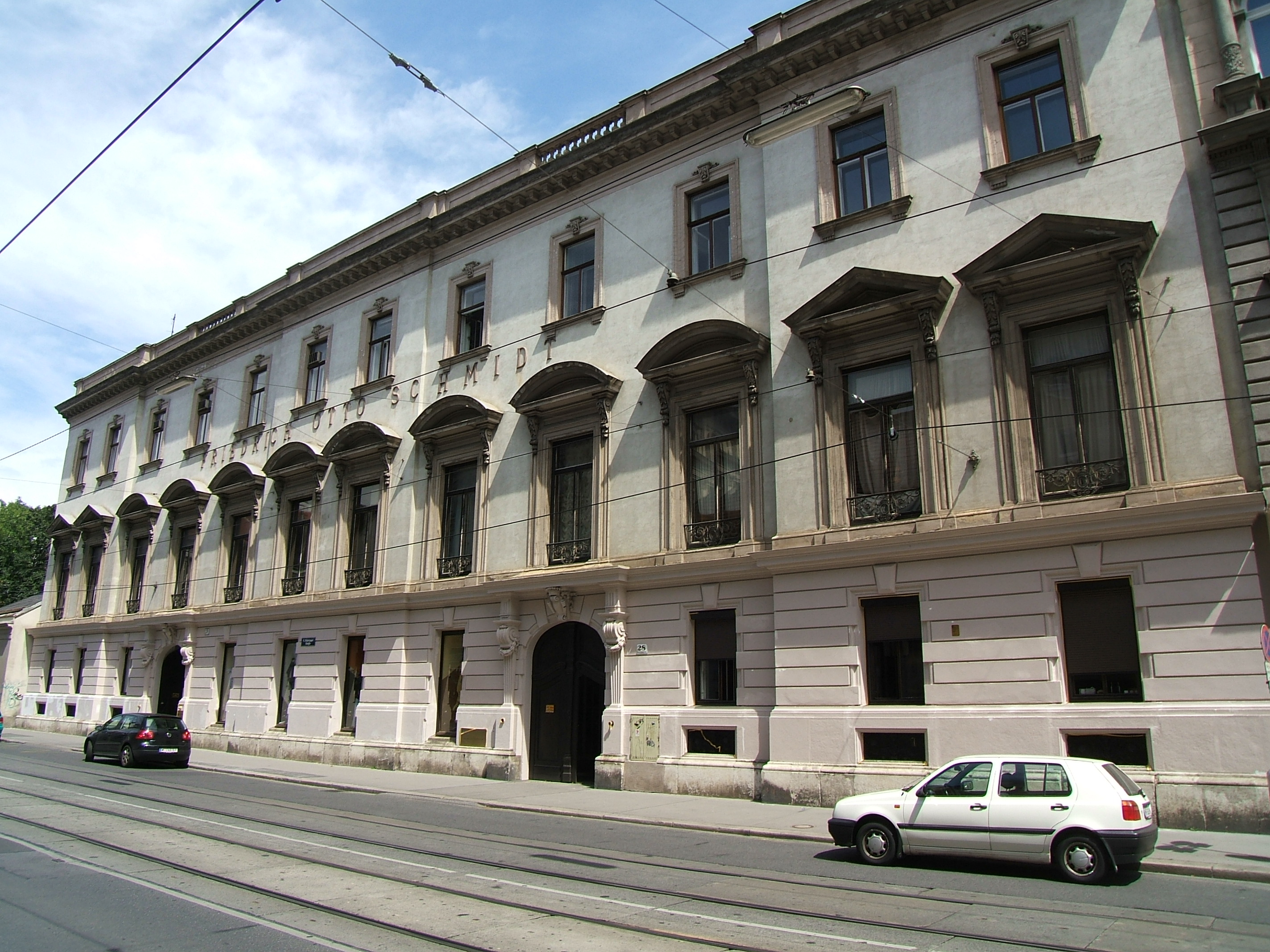
Palais Chotek in 2008

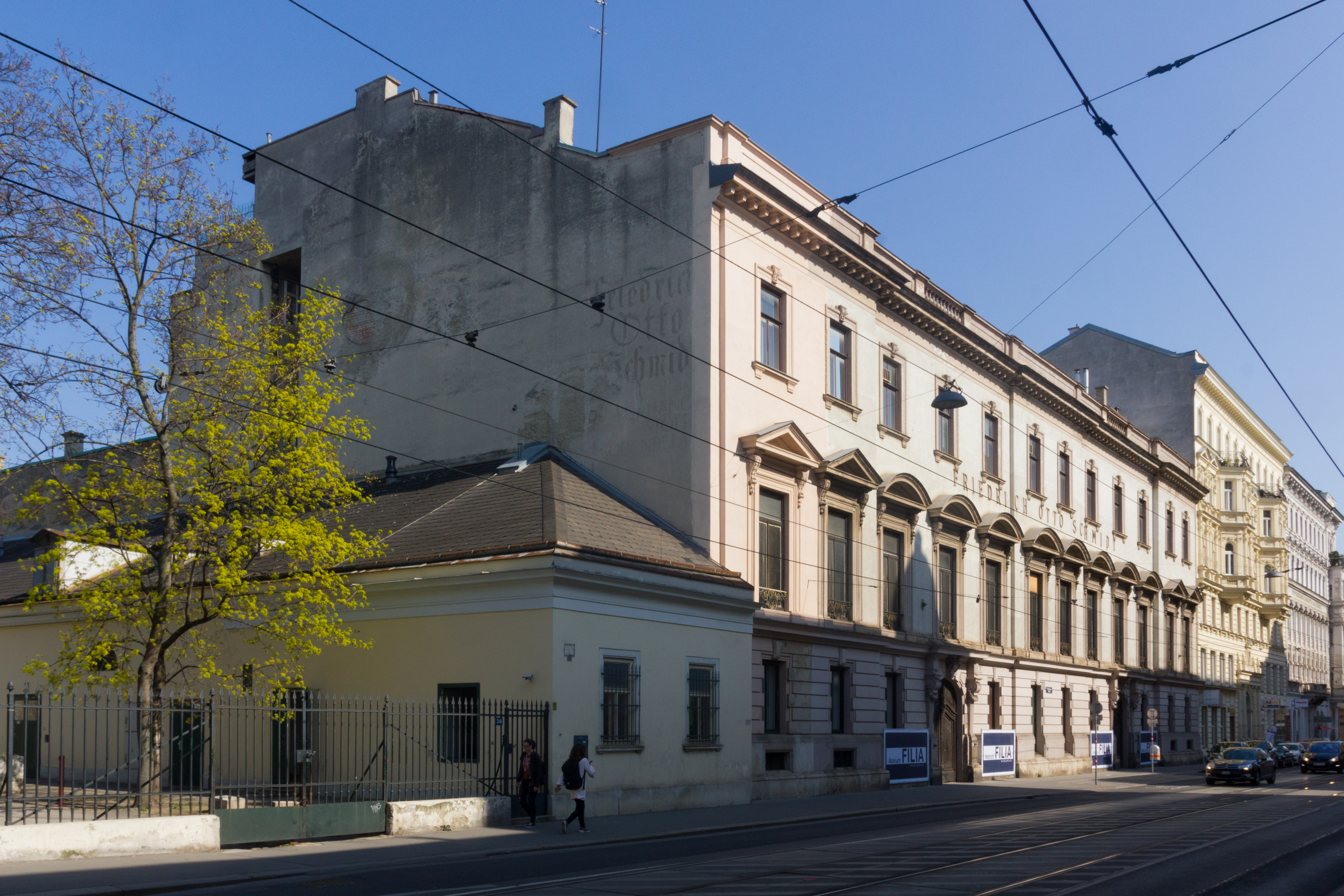
Palais Chotek streetscape

Palais Chotek is a Baroque palace in Vienna, Austria. It is located at Währinger Straße 28 in the IX. district of Alsergrund.

The building is named after the noble Chotek family. For over a century, it has been the headquarters of the Friedrich Otto Schmidt home furnishings company.

== Friedrich Otto Schmidt home furnishings ==
Carl Friedrich Schmidt was member of a carpenter family in Berlin and settled in Vienna in 1858 to work for the wallpaper retail company Tapeten-Niederlage F Schmidt & Sugg. In 1863 Friedrich Otto Schmidt home furnishings was registered as a company and began producing furniture. Adolf Loos later exercised an enduring creative influence on the company furniture design. Today the company also carries out restorations so handcrafted wood works continue to function as home furnishing.
