= Gaelyne Gabora =

Canadian soprano and music teacher (1931-2001)

Gaelyne Gabora (née Craig; 1931 – February 1, 2001) was a Canadian soprano and music teacher. She sung lieder, romance, and oratorio songs and performed music by Béla Bartók, Wolfgang Amadeus Mozart and Franz Schubert as well as Nova Scotian folksongs on television, radio and stage. Gabora recorded music and taught students in the United States, Italy and elsewhere.

== Early life ==
Gabora was born in Regina, Saskatchewan in 1931. She had three sisters and two brothers. She was brought up by her grandmother in Regina until the age to 12 when she moved to Kentville, Nova Scotia and then to Charlottetown, Prince Edward Island in 1943. Gabrora began her professional training to be a singer at Charlottetown, studying at the Notre Dame Academy. She later studied at the Guildhall School of Music and Drama, London on a scholarship from Charlottetown and Halifax, from 1953 to 1956 and the University of Music and Performing Arts Vienna from 1956 to 1958, graduating with honors, and studying under Erik Werba at the Academy. Other teachers included J. C. MacDonald, Audrey Farnell, Paula Koehler, Helen Issep, Bernard Diamant in Montreal from 1961 to 1968, and Pierre Bernac in France between 1971 and 1973.

== Career ==
She began her career at the Prince Edward Island Music Festival, and sung soprano with lieder, romance, and oratorio. Gabora performed music by Béla Bartók, Wolfgang Amadeus Mozart and Franz Schubert as well as Nova Scotian folksongs. She premiered Kelsey Jones' Songs of Innocence, a piece of music that was composed for her, on CBC Radio in 1965. Gabora gave recitals on the British Broadcasting Corporation (BBC), on Radio Austria, Soviet television, French television, to schools in Saskatchewan, and on opera programs broadcast by the English and French-language networks of Ici Radio-Canada Télé.

She made her operatic debut at the Mozartsaal, Vienna in 1966. Gabora appeared widely across Canada with the JMC Orford Festival, the Montreal Symphony Orchestra, Musica Camerata, Montreal, the National Arts Centre Orchestra, the Toronto Symphony Orchestra, the Victoria International Festival, the Monterey County Symphony Orchestra, the Early Music Ensemble and the Maryland Symphony Orchestra. Gabora performed with the Gabora String Quartet, and the Montreal Baroque Orchestra. She participated in the Barcelona International, Moscow Winter Nights, and Ravel (France) festivals. Gabora gave the debut performance in Canada of Dmitri Shostakovich's Vocal Instrumental Suit in 1972. She toured Europe for three weeks in early 1973, toured the Soviet Union on no fewer than six occasions, and Hungary under the auspices of the Canadian Embassy in 1982. Gabora was a member of the Chamber Music Chicago.

In 1967, Gabora recorded Alexander Brott's Songs of Contemplation with the McGill Chamber Orchestra. She recorded the music of Murray Adaskin, Johannes Brahms, Alan Hovhaness, Joseph Marx and Heitor Villa-Lobos in 1974. Gabora recorded George Frideric Handel's 'Crudel tiranno amor' and Henry Purcell's 'The Plaint' from the Fairy-Queen with the Montreal Baroque Orchestra in 1977. She recorded a 15-part series on the range and history of the art song for NPR in 1982. In 1996, she recorded two CDs of lieder with the Italian pianist Mario delli Ponti.

Gabora moved to the United States in 1980, but she continued to be active in performance, recording, and touring, concentrating on lieder, solo or chamber work, and contemporary music. She performed with the Borodin and Aeolian string quartets, and several mixed chamber ensembles, and was a founding member of the Trio Tre Musici that played in Milan, Italy. Gabora was professor emeritus of Voice at the St Louis Conservatory, also taught at the Johannesen International School of the Arts in Victoria, Canada, and the Incontri Nazionale di Musica, Italy. She provided master classes in Beijing, Euriope, North America and Tokyo. Gabora also taught at the Oberlin-at-Casalmaggiore summer festival in Italy, and gave private lessons in Oberlin, Ohio. Gaboras commissioned Epithalamion for soprano and violin, by the composer Sylvia Rickard, and the two premiered the piece in Winnipeg. She was a member of the jury for the 1996 CMC competition. Gabora won the International Schubert Prize in Moscow in 1979 and the Living Images of Chamber Music International Prize from the University of Milan in 1989.

== Personal life ==
She met the violinist Taras Gabora in Devon, England in 1956 and they married in Vienna in the same year.

== Death ==
Gabora died of cancer at the Peace Arch Hospital, White Rock, British Columbia on February 1, 2001. A memorial service for her was held at Redpath Hall on March 4, 2001.

== Legacy ==
Her husband and his friends instituted the Gaelyne Gabora Memorial Scholarship Fund for Outstanding Interpreters of the Art Song in Gabora's memory in 2001 and is awarded by the Schulich School of Music Scholarships Committee of McGill University "on the basis of excellence in the interpretation of the art song."
