= Palais Obizzi =

Coordinates: 48°12′39″N 16°22′08″E

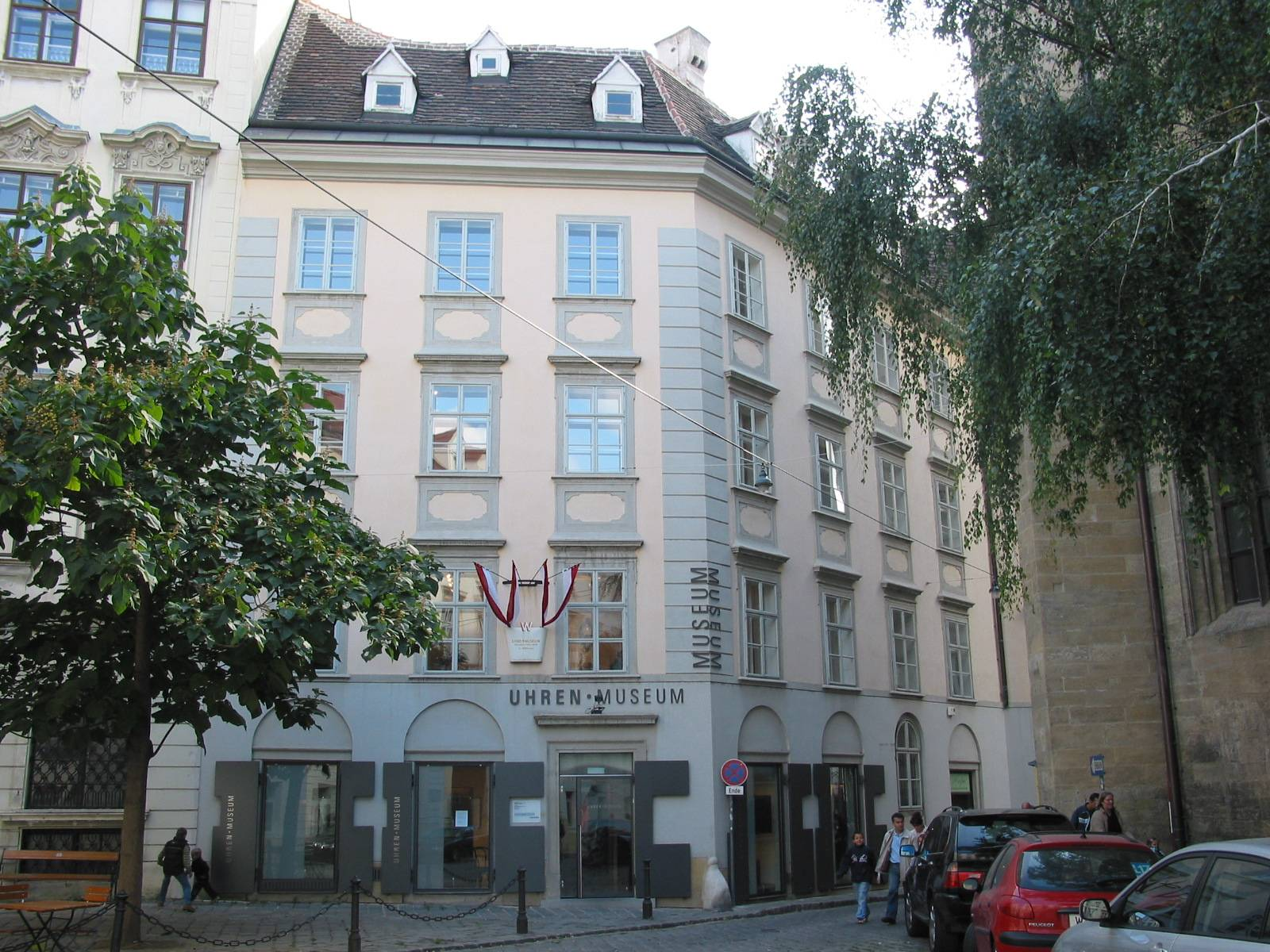
Palais Obizzi in Vienna

Palais Obizzi is a small baroque palace in Vienna, Austria.

Today it houses the Vienna Clock Museum (Uhrenmuseum).
