= Taras Gabora =

Taras (Daniel) Gabora is a violinist and prominent violin teacher. He was born in Yellow Creek, Saskatchewan, 23 Apr 1932.

== Early life ==
He studied at the University of Manitoba with Richard Seaborn, at the Paris Conservatory 1952–3 with René Benedetti, in Vienna 1953-7 with Ernst Morawec, and in Amsterdam 1957-8 with Szymon Goldberg. (He worked later – 1969 – with Yuri Jankelevich in Salzburg.) In 1956, on graduating from the Vienna Academy of Music, he received the Austrian Grand Prize.

== Career ==
Gabora settled in Montreal, Quebec in 1962. He founded the Gabora String Quartet (1964-8), the Groupe baroque de Montréal in 1968 with Gaston Germain, and Les Jeunes Solistes de Montréal in 1977, a group of 16.

Gabora taught at McGill University from 1962-4 and at the JMC Orford Art Centre from 1972-4. He also taught at the Conservatoire de Musique du Québec in the 70's.

Gabora performed on CBC radio and TV and in concerts in Canada, the USA, and Europe

In 1974 he made an LP with his wife, the soprano Gaelyne Gabora.
