= Mozarthaus Vienna =

Mozart's residence from 1784 to 1787

Coordinates: 48°12′28″N 16°22′31″E

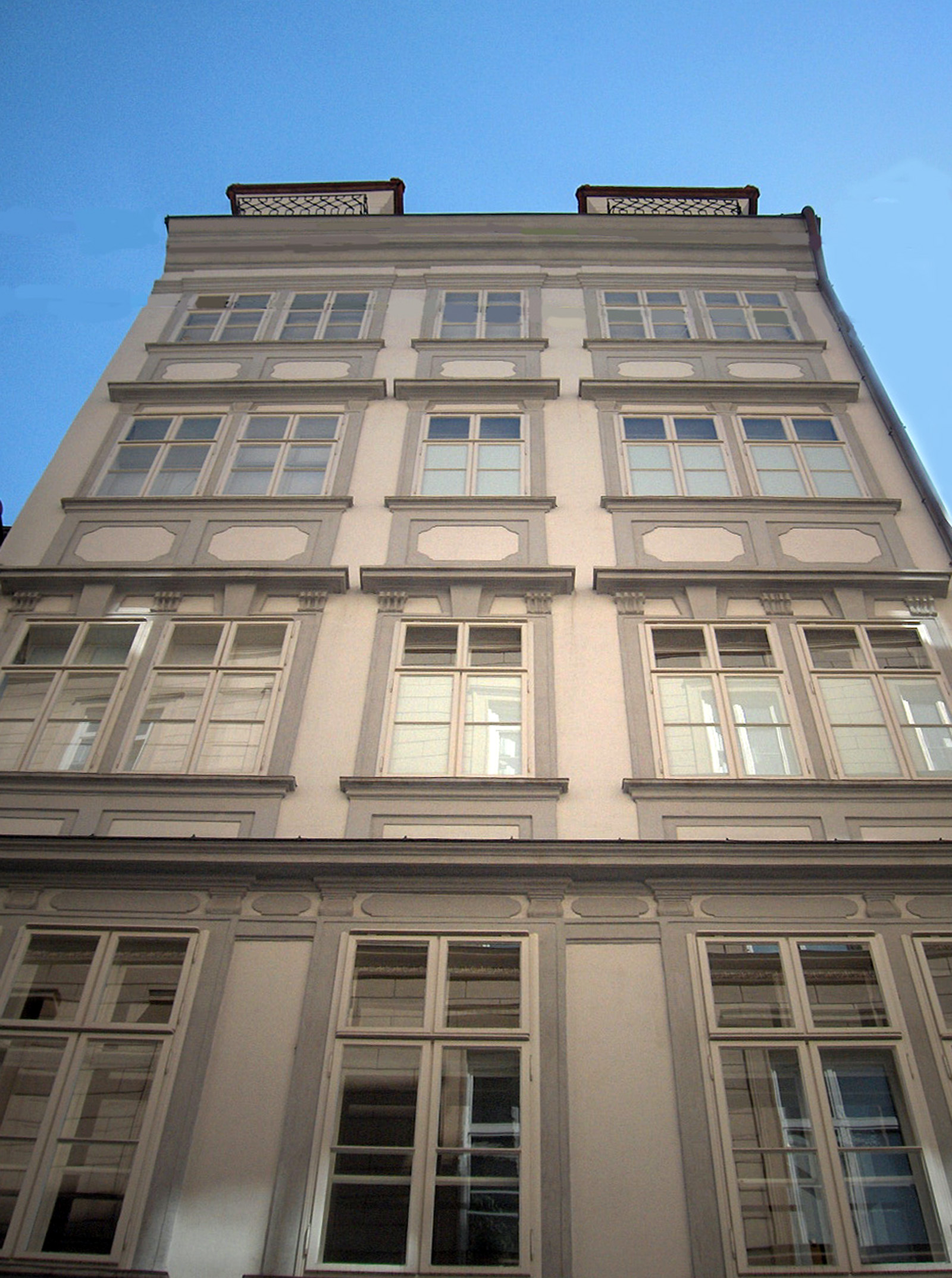
Mozarthaus Vienna

The Mozarthaus Vienna (also known as the Figaro House) was Mozart's residence from 1784 to 1787. The building is located in Vienna's Old Town, not far from St. Stephen's Cathedral, and is his only surviving Viennese residence. It is now a museum.

== History ==
The house is located at Domgasse 5. It was built in the 17th century, originally with two floors, and was redeveloped in 1716. Mozart rented rooms here from 1784, at which time it was also known as the Camesina House, after the family who had owned it since 1720. The original entrance of the house facing Schulerstraße (the one used by Mozart) was walled up to make room for a shop, and the house is entered today from its rear in the Domgasse.

In 1941, the 150th anniversary of Mozart's death, his former rooms were opened to the public as part of "Imperial German Mozart Week", a Nazi event intended to honour him as a "typically German" composer (in contrast to his polyglot lifestyle). In 1945 the running of the exhibition was taken over by the Vienna Museum. Despite its apparently attractive location near St. Stephen's Cathedral, visitor numbers at the so-called "Figaro House" were relatively modest, at around 80,000 per year.

In 2004, the City of Vienna's Wien Holding company undertook the total renovation of the Mozarthaus and redesigned it for visitors. This was completed in time for Mozart Year 2006, the 250th anniversary of his birth. Following a complete refurbishment, the entire building (including the expanded basement) became a centre dedicated to the composer's life and work, incorporating the rooms occupied by Mozart himself. The project was overseen by the Vienna Museum.The design of the historical courtyard was essentially destroyed by the installation of an elevator. The original 17th-century stone floor of the kitchen was removed and the original oak door of Mozart's apartment was varnished and relocated.

Today the Mozarthaus presents information about the composer in combination with historical exhibits and audio-visual installations, while the basement contains an events hall co-financed by the European Union. 340,000 people visited the museum in its first three years. The museum welcomed about 203,000 visitors in 2006, and about 215,000 visitors in 2019.

== Layout ==
The Figaro House building has five floors, with private apartments located on the fifth floor. The fourth floor to second basement of the house belong to Mozarthaus Vienna and are used as a museum and event rooms. The courtyard of the house is characterised by the Pawlatschengänge design typical for Vienna.

=== Fourth floor – Business Lounge ===
The "Business Lounge" is located on the fourth floor of the building. This is an event area consisting of several rooms. The event area is characterised by restored wall paintings in combination with modern wall coverings. The rooms are furnished with furniture from the interior design company Roche Bobois and a modern portrait of Mozart by the Austrian artist Oskar Stocker.

=== Third floor – Vienna in the Era of Mozart ===
The third floor shows Mozart's personal and social situation in Vienna. A multimedia installation presents all the places where Mozart lived during his Viennese years. Visitors also learn about Mozart's most important performance venues and people of importance to him, as well as socio-political contexts. His fondness for social life: balls, gambling, fashion, literature and science, as well as his connection to the thought world of the Freemasons, are closely examined. An installation with five peepholes gives a glimpse of the erotic “amusements” in this era. These rare shows are set up at either side of the Grabennymphen installation, in which visitors can look down through a door onto a stylised scene of the Graben square showing refined gentlemen and ladies of easy virtue.

=== Second floor – Mozart's Musical World ===
At the beginning of the tour through the second floor, Mozart's most important musician and composer colleagues in Vienna are presented. The exhibition also covers Mozart's collaboration with the librettist Lorenzo da Ponte in the operas The Marriage of Figaro and Don Giovanni. The historical stucco ceilings and wall paintings in these rooms give an impression of the original decoration of the entire house. This exhibition level also describes Mozart's Requiem and the end of his life, as well as a multimedia theatre installation "The Magic Flute - The Divine Laughter", which presents visitors with three-dimensional collages of scenes from The Magic Flute. The "Figaro Parallelo" is a media installation that offers an up-to-date overview of various Figaro productions from the world's leading opera houses with the different approaches of their respective directors.

=== First floor – The Mozart Apartment ===
On the first floor is the apartment where Mozart lived with his family from 1784 to 1787 and composed works such as his opera The Marriage of Figaro and three of the six Haydn Quartets. It is the largest, most distinguished and most expensive apartment Mozart ever lived in, and it is the only Viennese apartment that has survived to this day. There are four rooms, two cabinets and a kitchen in the apartment, and Mozart and his family are described with the help of photos and documents. An impressive flute clock is also on show, which is believed to have been made around 1790. It plays a variation of the Andante in F for a Small Mechanical Organ, K. 616, which Mozart probably composed for this or a similar clock.

=== Second Basement Floor – Concert Hall ===
In the second basement, the historically unique baroque vault was converted into a multifunctional event venue using modern elements. During the restoration, the vault structure of the old brickwork was preserved, but for reasons of monument protection, the brickwork of the lower area of the basement walls was protected with wall paneling.

== Special exhibition ==
In addition to the regular exhibition of the museum, Mozarthaus Vienna presents a new special exhibition annually, e.g. "Cherubino alla vittoria!" (2023), "The Triad of First Viennese School: Haydn - Mozart - Beethoven. Similarities - Parallels - Contrasts" (2021), "Mozart on the way to immortality. Genius and Posterity" (2018), "Rock Me Amadeus. The Story" (2016).

== See also ==
- List of music museums
