= Oswald Haerdtl =

Austrian architect

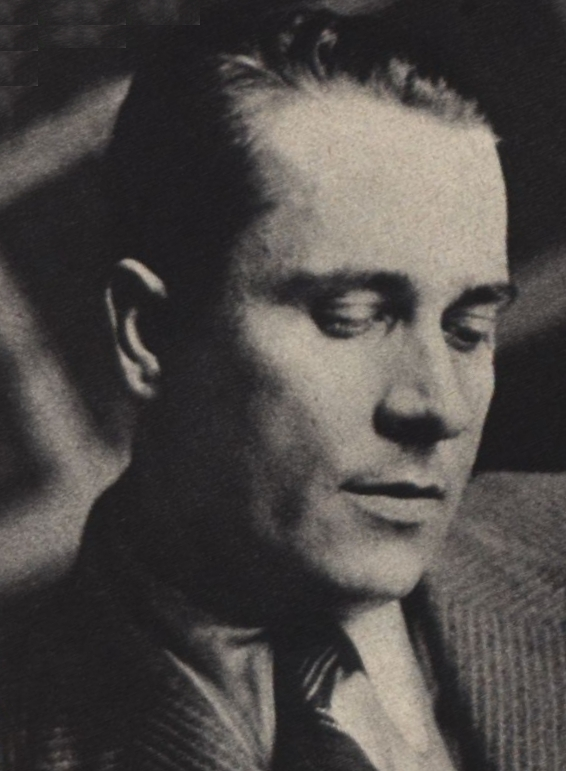
- Oswald Haerdtl in 1937
- Born: 17 May 1899; Vienna, Austria-Hungary
- Died: 9 August 1959 (aged 60); Vienna, Austria
- Occupation: Architect

Oswald Haerdtl (17 May 1899 – 9 August 1959) was an Austrian architect. His work was part of the architecture event in the art competition at the 1936 Summer Olympics.
