= Alservorstadt =

Alservorstadt

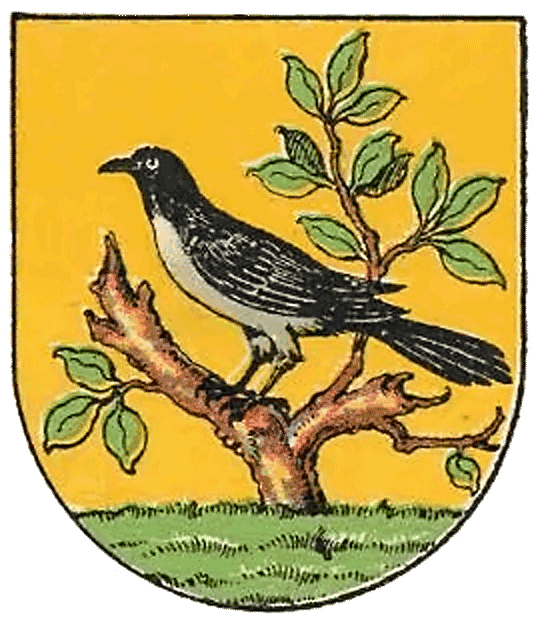
Coat of arms

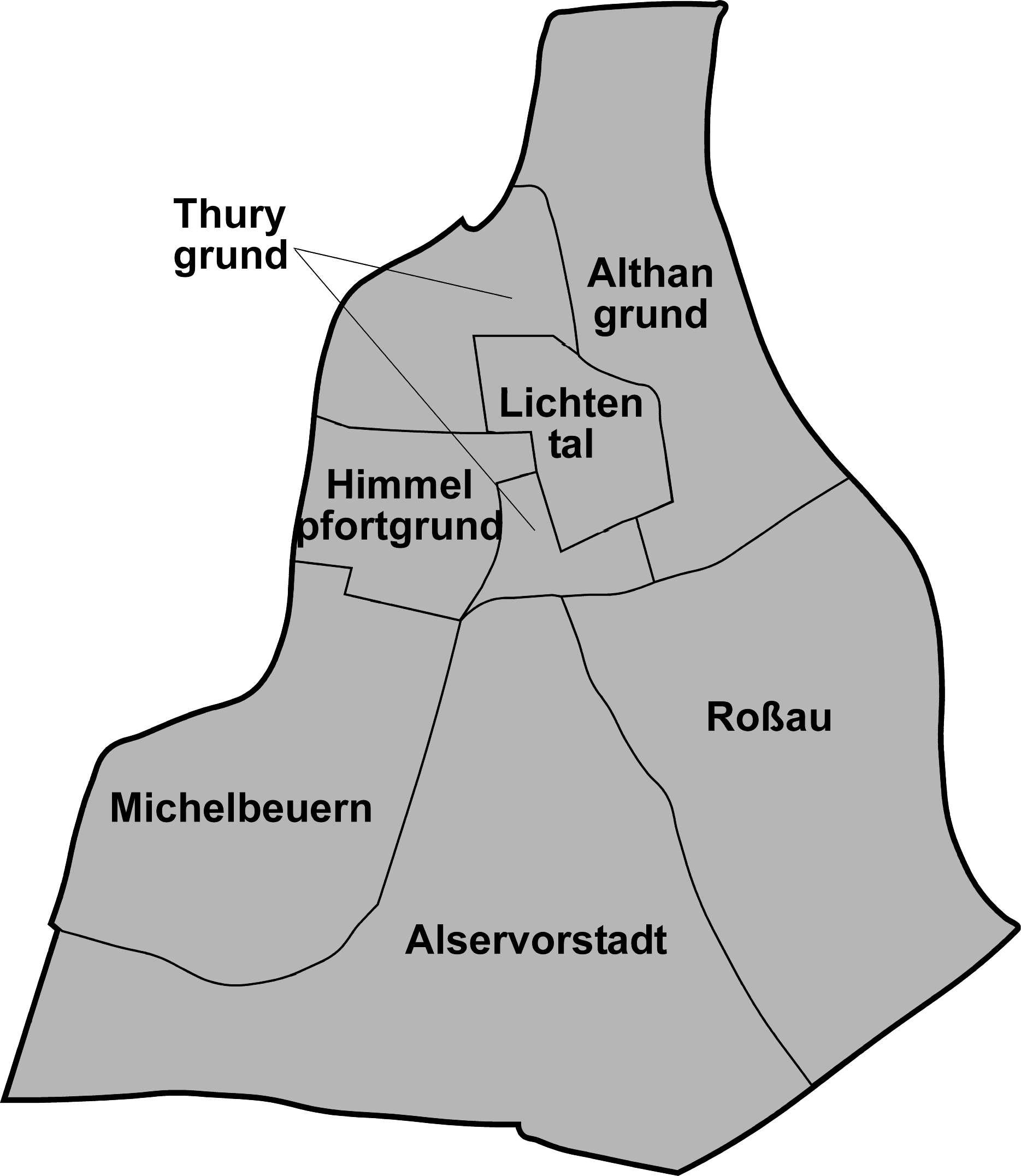
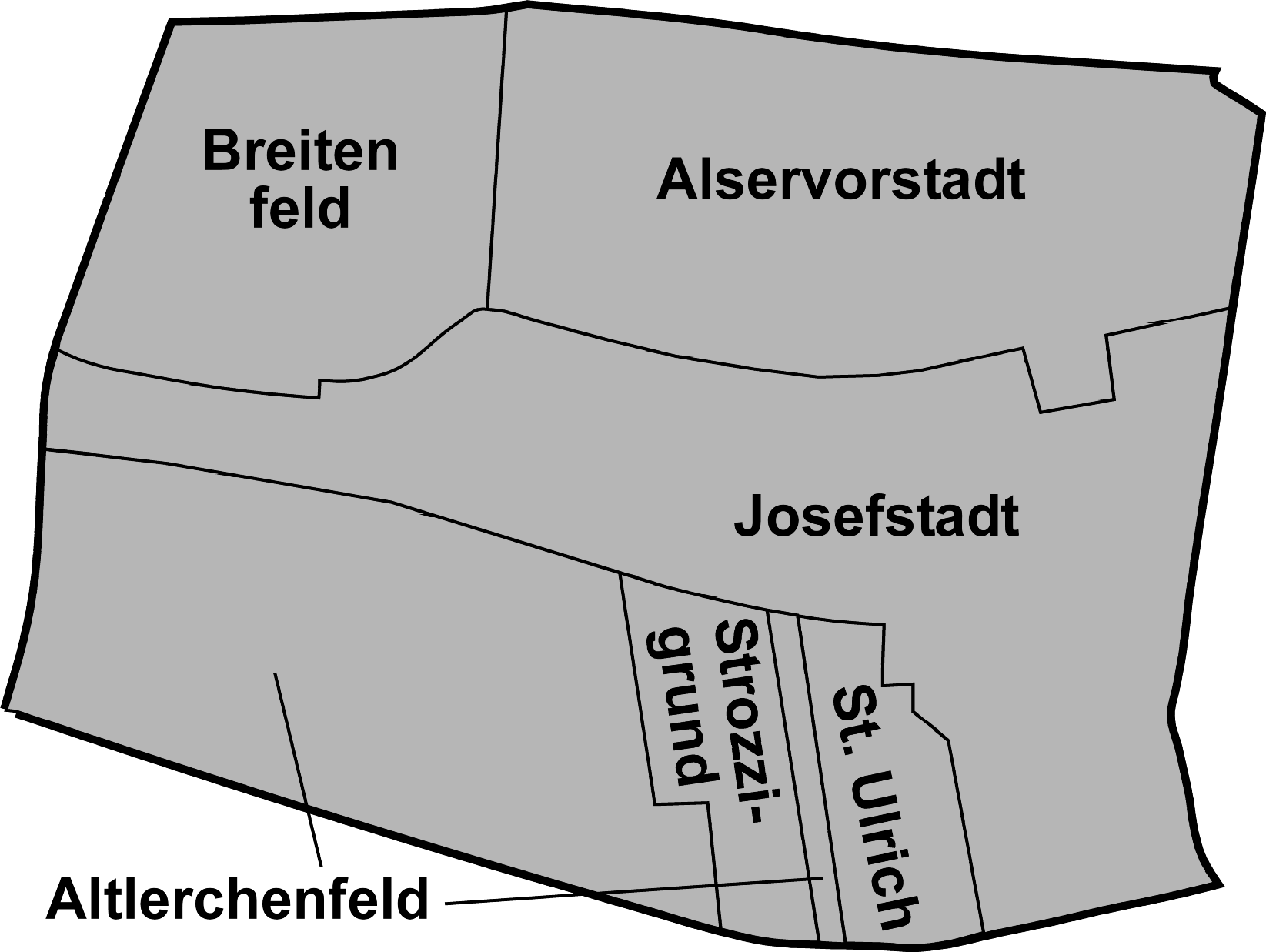
Map

Location: 48°12′59″N 16°21′24″E

Alservorstadt was an independent municipality until 1850 and is since then divided between Josefstadt and Alsergrund, the 8th and 9th districts of Vienna, respectively.

== Geography ==
Alservorstadt spans the south of Alsergrund and the north-east of Josefstadt. The street Alser Straße marks the border between the two districts. The name Alservorstadt (literal translation: suburb of the Als) derives from the river Als, whose which runs through the area and today is covered with concrete throughout the borough. Alservorstadt borders Thurygrund in the north, Roßau in the east, the Innere Stadt, Josefstadt and Breitenfeld in the south, as well as Währing and Michelbeuern in the west.

== History ==
Initially, the area was sparsely populated, but after the second siege of Vienna (1683), it was more densely settled, primarily along Alser Straße. At the end of the 17th century, the population of Slovenes, Croats and Slovaks previously residing in Spittelberg were forcibly moved to the so-called Krowotendörfl (literally: 'village of Croats') north of Alser Straße. In 1753, the Alser Kaserne barracks were erected (demolished in 1912). Traditionally, many poorhouses and hospitals were located in Alservorstadt, and their high mortality rate required many cemeteries, such as the Neuer Schottenfriedhof cemetery (documented up to 1784). 1784 also saw the inauguration of the Vienna General Hospital, a then public hospital regarded as modern with respect to contemporary standards. The same period also saw the establishment of the Findelhaus, a bearing house, and the k.k. Gewehrfabrik which became a substantial rifle supplier for the Austrian Army. From 1821 to 1862, the municipality of Alservorstadt maintained a town hall in a two-storey, baroque building located at 8., Laudongasse 5. In 1850, Alservorstadt was officially integrated into the city of Vienna as part of the Alsergrund district. In 1861, the southern part was transferred to the smaller district of Josefstadt.

== Sights ==
The neo-Gothic Votive Church was constructed from 1856 to 1879 by architect Heinrich von Ferstel. The classicist building of the Josephinum by architect Isidore Carnevale was erected as an academy for military surgeons in the 18th century. From the Schwarzspanierkirche (a former military Lutheran church), only the front façade remains to this day. The Strudlhofstiege is well known, immortalized in Heimito von Doderer's 1951 novel The Strudlhof Steps. Other sights include the fountains Wachsamkeitsbrunnen (at Schlesingplatz) and Schubertbrunnen at the border with Roßau. The Palais Schönborn houses the Austrian museum for ethnography while the Federal Pathologic-Anatomical Museum is located in the Narrenturm, Europe's oldest building dedicated to psychiatric patients. Moreover, the U.S. Embassy in Vienna is situated in the north of Alservorstadt.

== Economy and transportation ==
Alsergrund is well integrated into the Viennese public transit network, in particular with the U-Bahn stations Alser Straße in the west and Schottentor to the east. The headquarters of the Austrian central bank, the penitentiary Justizanstalt Josefstadt and the town hall of Josefstadt are located in the area. Although the Vienna General Hospital has moved to Michelbeuern, some medical institutions remain, in particular the pediatric hospital St. Anna Kinderspital. Moreover, the borough comprises several important educational institutions, such as the campus of the University of Vienna, or the Lycée Français de Vienne.

== Notable residents ==
- Rudolf von Alt (1812–1905), painter
