= List of museums in Vienna =

This list of museums in Vienna, Austria contains museums which are defined for this context as institutions (including nonprofit organizations, government entities, and private businesses) that collect and care for objects of cultural, artistic, scientific, or historical interest and make their collections or related exhibits available for public viewing. Also included are non-profit art galleries and university art galleries.

== The list ==
Name	Image	District	Type	Summary
Academy of Fine Arts Vienna		Innere Stadt	Art	Features public painting gallery
Albertina		Innere Stadt	Art	Features prints and drawings, graphic works, photographs and architectural drawings
Albertina modern		Innere Stadt	Art	Modern Austrian art in Künstlerhaus Wien
Alt Wiener Schnapsmuseum		Hietzing	Beverages	website, history and manufacture of schnapps
Architekturzentrum Wien		Neubau	Architecture	Architecture and urban design of the 20th and 21st centuries, located in Museumsquartier
Arnold Schönberg Center			Biography	Life of composer Arnold Schönberg, music culture center
Augarten Porcelain Museum		Leopoldstadt	Art	website, history of Vienna porcelain and Augarten porcelain
Austrian Film Museum		Innere Stadt	Cinema	website
Austrian Museum of Folk Life and Folk Art		Josefstadt	Art	website, located in the Schönborn Palace, traditional folk art and culture of Austria and its neighbouring countries
Austrian Social and Economic Museum		Margareten	History	website, economy, business, trade, monetary system
Austrian Theatre Museum			Theatre	Theatre history in Austria
Bank Austria Kunstforum		Innere Stadt	Art	website, Austrian art collection of Bank Austria
Beethoven Eroicahaus		Döbling	Biography	Memorial to composer Ludwig van Beethoven's stay in Oberdöbling in the summer of 1803, during which he composed a large part of his Eroica Symphony, operated by the Vienna Museum
Beethoven Pasqualatihaus		Innere Stadt	Biography	Life in and work of composer Ludwig van Beethoven in Vienna, operated by the Vienna Museum
Beethoven Wohnung Heiligenstadt		Döbling	Biography	House where composer Ludwig van Beethoven wrote the Heiligenstadt Testament, operated by the Vienna Museum
Belvedere		Landstraße	Historic house	Include two Baroque palaces, museum of Austrian art from the Middle Ages to the present, gardens
Belvedere 21		Landstraße	Art	Austrian art of the twentieth and twenty-first centuries
Brennpunkt			Technology	information, history of heating and day-to-day life in the city
Chimney Sweep Museum			Technology	information, history of chimney sweeping
Church of the Teutonic Order		Innere Stadt	Religious	Ecclesiastical artifacts and treasures
Demel		Innere Stadt	Food	Artifacts and history of the historic Imperial chocolate maker
Esperanto Museum		Innere Stadt	History	Part of the Austrian National Library, relationship of man to language
Design Forum Wien		Neubau	Art	website, gallery for study of design, located in Museumsquartier
Dommuseum		Innere Stadt	Art	Sacral works of art from St. Stephen's Cathedral and other churches in Vienna and Lower Austria
Emperor Franz Joseph Hat Museum			Fashion	website
Ephesos Museum		Innere Stadt	History	Antiquities from the city of Ephesus in modern-day Turkey, located in a wing of the Hofburg Palace
Ernst Fuchs Museum		Penzing	Art	website, works by Ernst Fuchs
European Coat of Arms Museum			History	information, development of coats of arms and heraldry
Fantasy Art Museum		Innere Stadt	Art	website, works by the Vienna School of Fantastic Realism and by important international artists of fantasy, surreal and visionary art
Federal Pathologic-Anatomical Museum Vienna			Science	Anatomy and pathology
Foltermuseum			History	website, history of torture and corporal punishment
Foto Arsenal Wien			Photographic	Vienna’s new center for photographic images and lens-based media
Funeral Museum Vienna			History	Funerary customs
Generali Foundation			Art	Works by many international artists, mainly from the 1960s to today
Geymüllerschlössel		Währing	Decorative arts	Small palace with furniture and decorative art from the Biedermeier period and a clock collection, branch of the Museum of Applied Arts
Globe Museum		Innere Stadt	History	Part of the Austrian National Library, terrestrial and celestial globes, lunar and planet globes, and instruments related to globes (armillary spheres, planetaria, telluria)
Haus der Musik		Innere Stadt	Music	History of music
Haydnhaus		Mariahilf	Biography	Life of composer Joseph Haydn, operated by the Vienna Museum
Heeresgeschichtliches Museum		Landstraße	Military	Austrian military history from the 16th century to 1945
Hermesvilla		Hietzing	Historic house	Imperial castle remodeled by Emperor Franz Joseph I for his wife Empress Elisabeth in the late 19th century, operated by the Vienna Museum
Hofburg Palace		Innere Stadt	Multiple	Includes the Imperial Apartments, Silver Collection, Sisi Museum, Kunsthistorisches Museum's collections of arms and armour and musical instruments
Hofburg Wien: Kaiserappartements		Innere Stadt	Historic house	website, located in the Hofburg Palace, rooms used by Emperor Joseph II, includes museum about his wife Sisi and the Imperial Silver Collection
Imperial Crypt		Innere Stadt	History	Sarcophagi and tombs of the Imperial family, located below the Capuchin Church
Imperial Furniture Collection		Innere Stadt	Decorative art	Furniture from the 18th to early 20th century, includes the Egyptian room of Empress Maria Ludovica, Biedermeier and Wiener Moderne pieces
Jewish Museum Vienna		Innere Stadt	History	Jewish history, life and religion in Austria
Johann Strauss Wohnung		Leopoldstadt	Biography	Life of famous waltz composer Johann Strauss II, operated by the Vienna Museum
Kunsthalle Wien		Neubau	Art	Temporary exhibitions of contemporary international art, located in Museumsquartier
KunstHausWien		Landstraße	Art	Features works by Friedensreich Hundertwasser and other exhibits
Kunsthistorisches Museum		Innere Stadt	Art	Includes fine art, Egyptian, Near Eastern, Ancient Greek and Roman antiquities, sculpture and decorative arts, coins
Kunstraum Niederoesterreich			Art	website, art and project space located in the Palais Niederösterreich
Kuffner observatory		Ottakring	Science	Astronomy
Leopold Museum		Neubau	Art	Modern Austrian art including key paintings and drawings by Egon Schiele and Gustav Klimt, located in Museumsquartier
Liechtenstein Garden Palace		Alsergrund	Art	Pre-booked guided tours of significant collection of European art
Lichtenstein City Palace			Historic house	Baroque palace under restoration
Madame Tussauds Vienna			Wax	
MAK		Innere Stadt	Art	Applied arts and contemporary art
MAK Depot of Contemporary Art			Art	website, branch of MAK, exhibits of contemporary art
Money Museum of the Oesterreichische Nationalbank			Numismatic	website, operated by Austria's central bank Oesterreichische Nationalbank, evolution of the monetary system, banknotes, banknote designs, securities and coins
Mozarthaus Vienna		Innere Stadt	Biography	Life in and work of composer Wolfgang Amadeus Mozart in Vienna, operated by the Vienna Museum
MUMOK		Museumsquartier	Art	Modern and contemporary art works
MUSA (Vienna)		Innere Stadt	Art	website, City of Vienna's art exhibition space
Museum Aspern Essling			History	website, history of the 1809 Battle of Aspern-Essling during the Napoleonic Wars
Museum of Illusions		Innere Stadt	Amusement	website, exhibit featuring optical and spatial illusions
museum in progress		Mariahilf	Art	Specialised on extraordinary contemporary art projects in media and public spaces
Museum Judenplatz		Innere Stadt	History	Social, cultural and religious life of the Jews of Vienna in the Middle Ages
Museum of Art Fakes		Landstraße	Art	Forged art
Museum of Contraception and Abortion			Science	website
Museum of Ethnology		Innere Stadt	Ethnography	Ethnographic and archaeological objects from Asia, Africa, Oceania, and America
Museum of Young Art			Art	21st century art
Museum of the History of Medicine		Alsegrund	Science	website, anatomical and obstetric wax models, operated by the Medical University of Vienna
Natural History Museum of Vienna		Innere Stadt	Natural history	Displays include geology, paleontology, the animal world from protozoa to insects to highly developed mammals
Neidhart Fresken		Innere Stadt	Art	Medieval secular mural paintings that show scenes from the life and work of the minnesinger Neidhart von Reuental
Original Vienna Snowglobe Museum		Währing	Commodity	website, collection of snowglobes
Österreichische Galerie Belvedere		Landstraße	Art	Located in the Belvedere, masterpieces from the Middle Ages and Baroque until the 21st century
Otto Wagner Hofpavillon Hietzing		Hietzing	Transportation	Railway pavilion built for the Emperor and his court, operated by the Vienna Museum
Otto Wagner Pavilion Karlsplatz		Innere Stadt	Biography	Life and work of Viennese architect Otto Wagner, operated by the Vienna Museum
Papyrus Museum		Innere Stadt	History	Part of the Austrian National Library, exhibits of papyrus from its collections
Peace Museum Vienna		Innere Stadt	Peace	website, street museum highlighting 150-plus peace heroes in Windows for Peace project, part of the International Network of Museums for Peace
Pharmacy and Drugstore Museum Vienna		Wieden	Science	website, development of the profession and the history of the drugstore
Prater Museum		Leopoldstadt	Amusement	History of Vienna's largest amusement park, the Wurstelprater, operated by the Vienna Museum
quartier21		Neubau	Art	website, contemporary art and culture gallery, located in Museumsquartier
Red Vienna in the Laundry		Döbling	History	website, history of the Red Vienna government of Austria from 1919 to 1934, located in the Karl Marx-Hof
Römermuseum		Innere Stadt	History	History and culture of Ancient Rome in Vienna, operated by the Vienna Museum
Schatzkammer		Innere Stadt	Art	Part of the Hofburg Palace, features the Kunsthistorisches Museum's collections of royal treasures and religious relics
SchokoMuseum			Food	website, chocolate
Schönbrunn Palace	125px	Hietzing	Multiple	Includes the Rococo palace, gardens, museum of carriages in the Wagenburg, children's museum
Schottenstift Museum			Art	Benedictine monastery with major paintings, furniture, tapestries, vestments and liturgical objects and vestments
Schubert Geburtshaus		Alsergrund	Biography	Birthplace of composer Franz Schubert, operated by the Vienna Museum
Schubert Sterbewohnung		Wieden	Biography	House where composer Franz Schubert lived until his death, operated by the Vienna Museum
Scout Museum		Mariahilf	Scouting	website, history of the Boy Scouts in Austria
Secession Building		Innere Stadt	History	Changing exhibits of contemporary art, features the Beethoven Frieze by Gustav Klimt
Sigmund Freud Museum		Alsergrund	Biography	House, life and work of Sigmund Freud, the founder of psychoanalysis
Strauss Museum		Alsergrund	Biography	Life and work of the Strauss Family Johann I, Johann II, Josef, Eduard and Johann III Strauss.
State Hall of the Austrian National Library		Innere Stadt	Library	18th century Baroque library room
Technisches Museum Wien		Penzing	Science	History of science in industry, including astronomy, physics, mining, iron, steel, energy, communications and media, transportation, music
Third Man Museum			Media	website, collection of memorabilia related to the 1949 film noir The Third Man, which was filmed in Vienna in 1948
Urania (Vienna)		Innere Stadt	Science	Astronomy
Uhrenmuseum		Innere Stadt	Horology	Clocks, operated by the Vienna Museum
Vienna Crime Museum		Leopoldstadt	Law enforcement	Wiener Kriminalmuseum website, includes the Vienna Police Department Museum, history of judicial and police system and the proceeds from crime by the late Middle Ages to the present
Vienna Undertakers Museum			History	Bestattungsmuseum Wien website, information, funeral and cemetery items and customs
Vienna Museum Karlsplatz		Innere Stadt	History	History, art and culture of the city, main location of the Vienna Museum
Vienna Observatory		Währing	Science	Astronomy
Vienna Schuhmuseum		Josephstadt	Fashion	website, development of shoe-making and orthopedic shoe-making
Vienna Transport Museum Remise		Landstraße	Transport	website, collection of trams, buses and light rail vehicles, operated by Wiener Linien
Viktor Frankl Museum		Alsergrund	Insight and education	Opened 26 March 2015. website Viktor E. Frankl was a neurologist and psychiatrist.
Wagenburg		Hietzing	Transport	Located on the grounds of Schönbrunn Palace, carriages and horse-drawn vehicles and equipment
Wiener Werkstätte Museum			Decorative arts	website, designs and examples of Wiener Werkstätte furniture and decorative arts
ZOOM Kindermuseum		Neubau	Children's	website, located in Museumsquartier

== Defunct museums ==
- Lipizzaner Museum
