= Campus of the University of Vienna =

University campus in Vienna, Austria

- Campus der Universität Wien
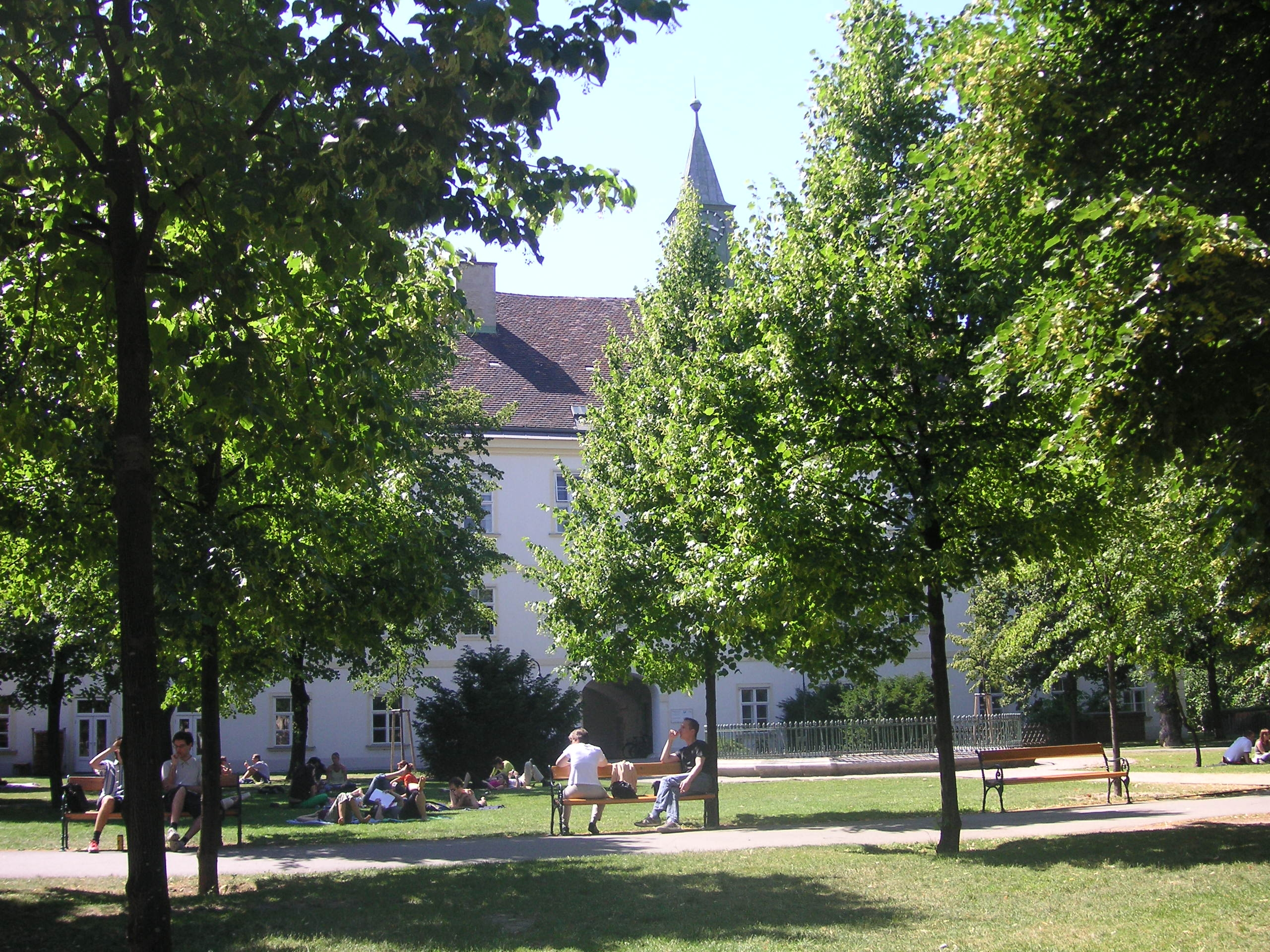
- Courtyard of the campus
- Established: 1998
- Parent institution: University of Vienna
- Location: Alsergrund, Vienna, Austria; 48.21719°N 16.35325°E
- Campus: 2,322 acres (940 ha)

The Campus of the University of Vienna is one of the main sites of the University of Vienna, located in the Alsergrund district of Vienna, just over 500 metres northwest of the Main building. It occupies the former site of the Vienna General Hospital, a complex dating back to the late 17th century.

== History ==
=== Prehistory ===
Construction in the area began between 1693 and 1697 under Emperor Leopold I, when a Großarmenhaus (poorhouse) for invalids of the Ottoman–Habsburg wars, as well as the homeless, was built. Expanded several times during the 18th century, the complex grew to accommodate up to 6,000 people. In 1783, Emperor Joseph II ordered its conversion into a hospital, following the model of the Paris Hôtel-Dieu. The Allgemeines Krankenhaus (General Hospital, AKH) opened in 1784 and became a central institution of the Vienna Medical School, associated with physicians such as Ignaz Semmelweis, Theodor Billroth, and Karl Landsteiner.

By the late 19th century, the site was increasingly regarded as too small and unsuitable for the growing demands of the hospital. The decision to construct a new hospital was taken in the 1950s, and building began in 1964. At that time, approximately two-thirds of the Old General Hospital complex was owned by the City of Vienna and one-third by the Republic of Austria. In 1965, on the University of Vienna's 600th anniversary, Mayor Franz Jonas announced that the city was considering transferring its share of the site to the university once the new hospital was completed. Plans for a university campus near Schottentor had already been envisaged in the university's founding charter of 1365, but had never been realised.

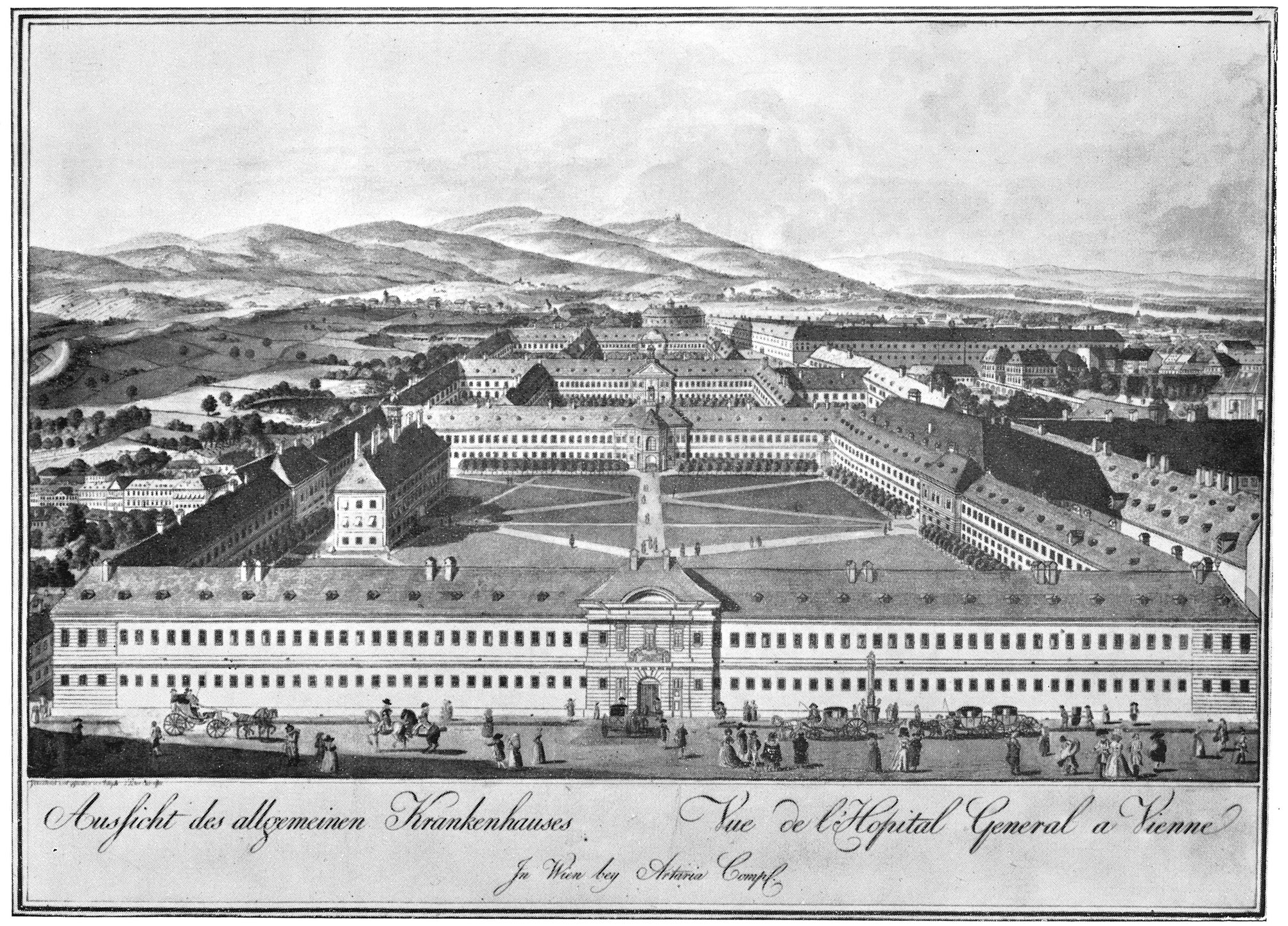
The AKH in 1784

The legal basis for the transfer was established with the University Organisation Act of 1975. Completion of the new hospital was repeatedly delayed, including as a result of the AKH scandal in 1980. Various proposals for the reuse of the old hospital site were developed in the 1980s, including residential use, which was ultimately rejected due to heritage protection costs. In 1987, the City of Vienna held a design competition, won by a citizens' initiative advocating the preservation of the historic buildings and the greening of the courtyards; its core concepts were largely implemented.

=== University ===
Following a feasibility study, the deed transferring the city's share of the Old General Hospital to the university was signed on 7 December 1988 by Mayor Helmut Zilk and Rector Wilhelm Holczabek. The city required that parts of the site remain accessible to the public. Financing for the conversion was secured through the sale of one courtyard to the Austrian National Bank, federal funding, and third-party funds raised by the university. After the completion of the New General Hospital in 1994, conversion works for the campus took place between 1995 and 1998.

The campus was officially opened on 16 October 1998 by Rector Wolfgang Greisenegger and Mayor Michael Häupl, following a ten-year planning and construction period. The university primarily relocated humanities institutes to the site, many of which had previously been housed in the New Institute Building (NIG). From the outset, the landscaped courtyards as well as the campus's restaurants and shops were open to the general public.

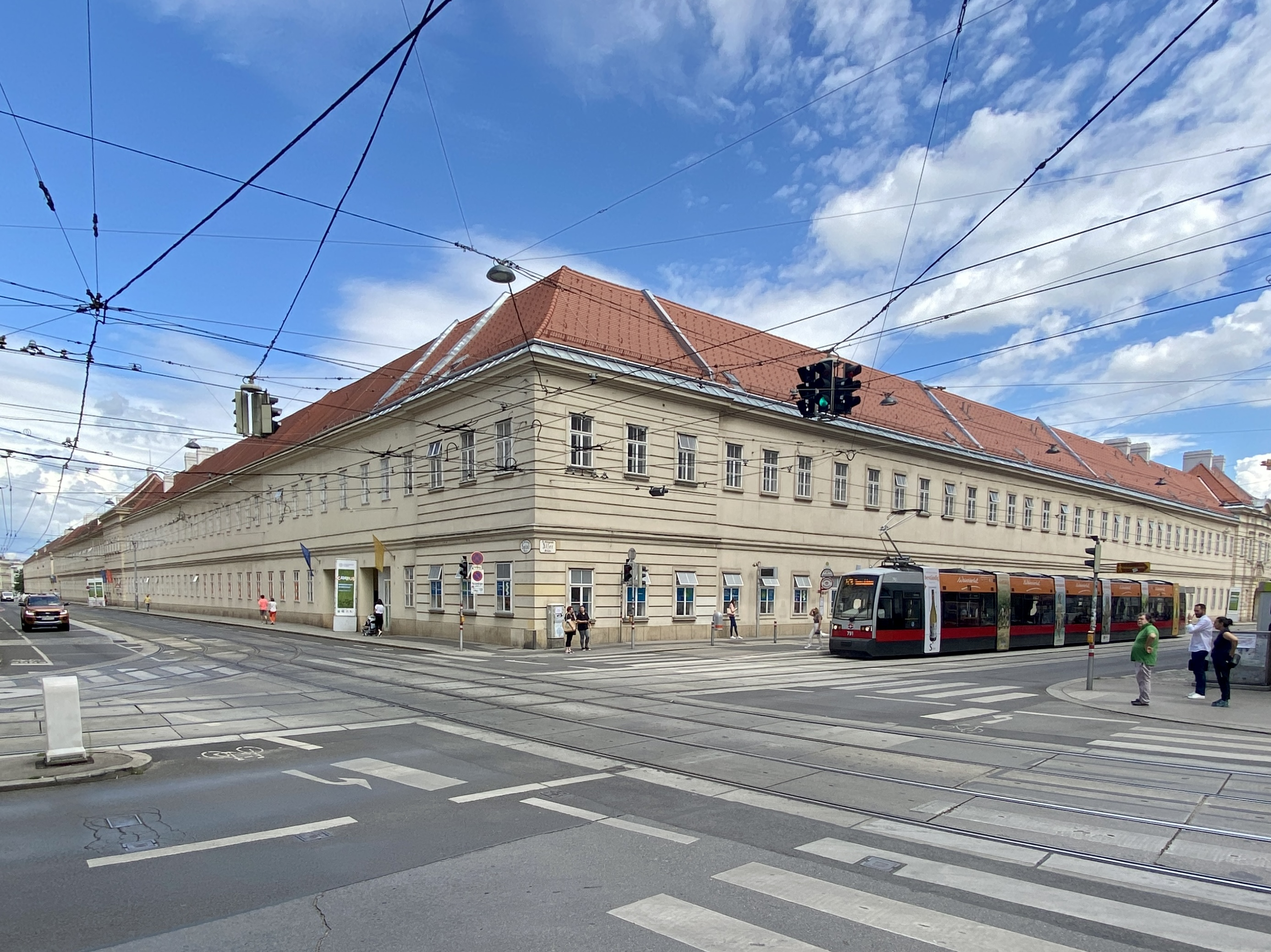
The campus from Alser Straße/Spitalgasse

Between 2002 and 2003, a new lecture hall centre was constructed on the campus. The former hospital synagogue, originally intended to be reactivated as a Jewish place of worship, was instead converted into the memorial space Marpe Lanefesch ("Healing for the Soul"), which opened in 2005. Since 2009, it has also housed the university's handwritten memorial book for the victims of Nazism in 1938 following the Anschluss. In 2012, the Pathological-Anatomical Museum in the Narrenturm was administratively integrated into the Natural History Museum Vienna.

== Site ==
The campus covers an area of approximately 96,000 m² and is divided into ten courtyards surrounded mainly by two- to three-storey buildings. Despite later alterations, the original hospital layout dating from the Josephinian period remains clearly recognisable. The campus is a listed monument and forms part of the buffer zone of the UNESCO World Heritage Site Historic Centre of Vienna. The former main entrance of the hospital complex is marked by the Sonnenfels Gate on Alser Straße. The campus is embedded in a dense urban setting close to the city centre.

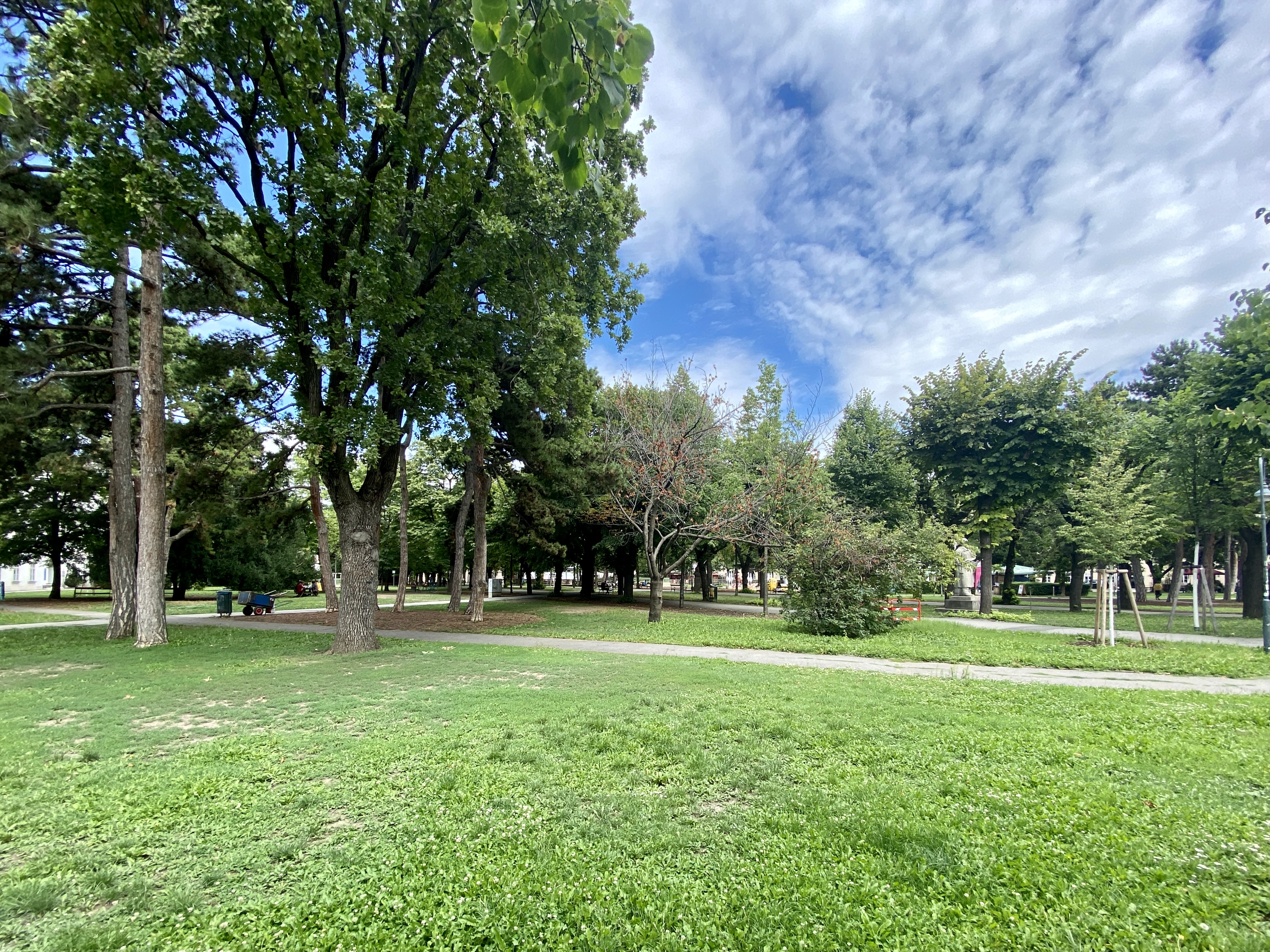
Courtyard 1

=== Courtyards ===
The campus is divided into ten courtyards (Höfe), each accommodating academic, cultural, or administrative functions. Courtyard 1, the largest courtyard, forms the southern part of the campus. It contains numerous academic institutes, central university facilities, event and seminar rooms, as well as a grocery store and restaurants. The university's branch of the Austrian Students' Association (ÖH) is headquartered in the courtyard.

Courtyard 2 is situated at the centre of the campus and includes the main lecture hall complex. Several institutes focusing on Asian and East Asian studies are located here. The courtyard also features a protected Judas tree and commemorative plaques. Courtyard 3 houses the institutes of Slavic Studies and Eastern European History. Courtyard 4 contains the Institute of Oriental Studies and a childcare facility. Courtyard 5 accommodates the institutes of African Studies and East Asian Studies, as well as their departmental libraries. Courtyard 6, located at the northern edge of the campus, includes the Narrenturm, which houses the pathological-anatomical collection of the Natural History Museum Vienna. Courtyard 7 is home to institutes of Jewish Studies and Finno-Ugric Studies, as well as computer-based teaching facilities. Courtyard 8 accommodates the Institutes of English and American Studies and Romance Studies. Courtyard 9 houses the Institutes of Art History and Musicology. Courtyard 10 is dominated by the former Pathological Institute, now used by the Medical University of Vienna and the University of Vienna, including a large lecture hall.

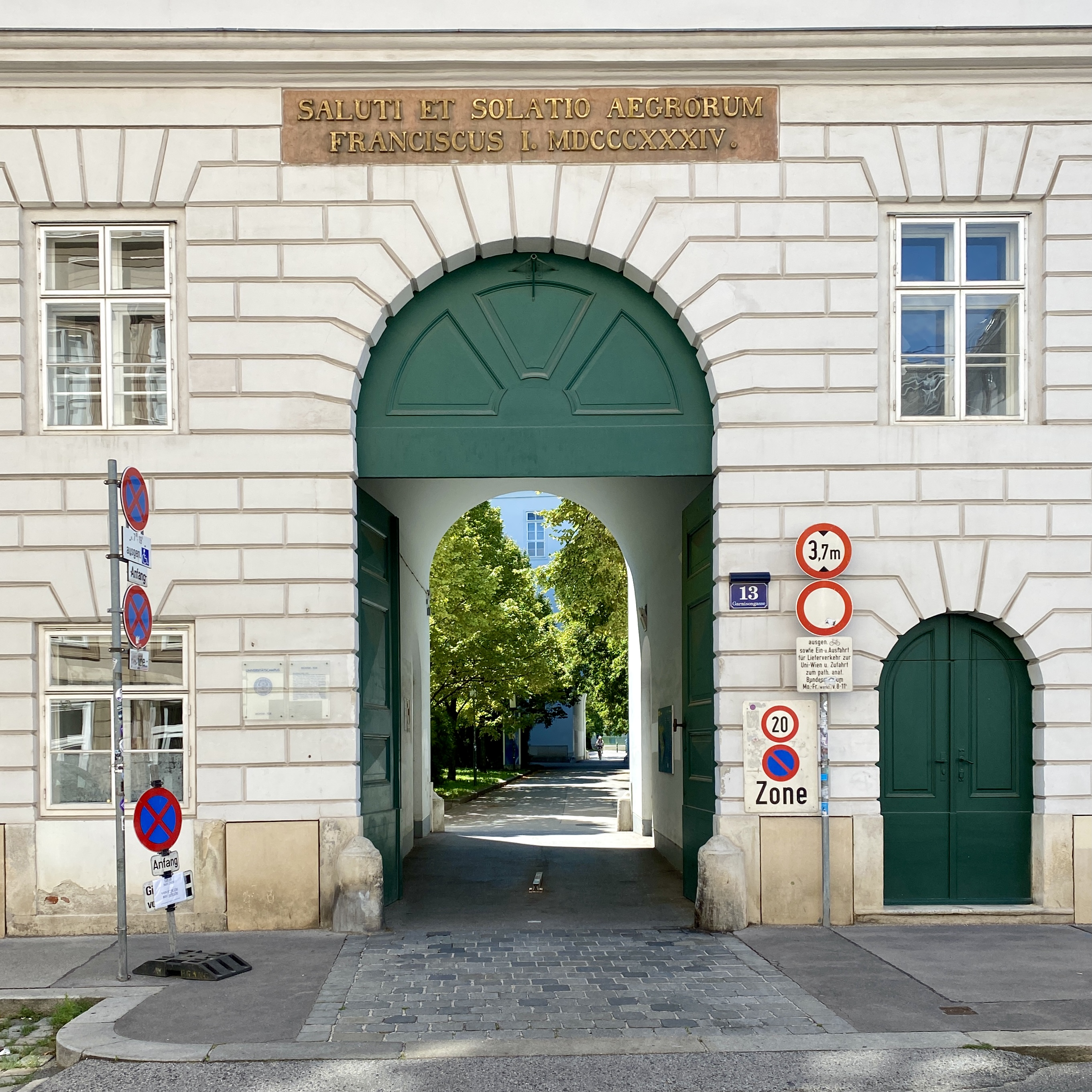
The Richter gate

In addition to the courtyards, the campus includes 23 named entrances and passageways known as the Gates of Remembrance, which connect the courtyards with one another and the surrounding streets. They are named after notable figures from the history of Viennese scholarship, with particular consideration given to women and individuals persecuted or displaced during the Nazi era, including Marie Jahoda, Elise Richter, and Sigmund and Anna Freud.

== Gallery ==
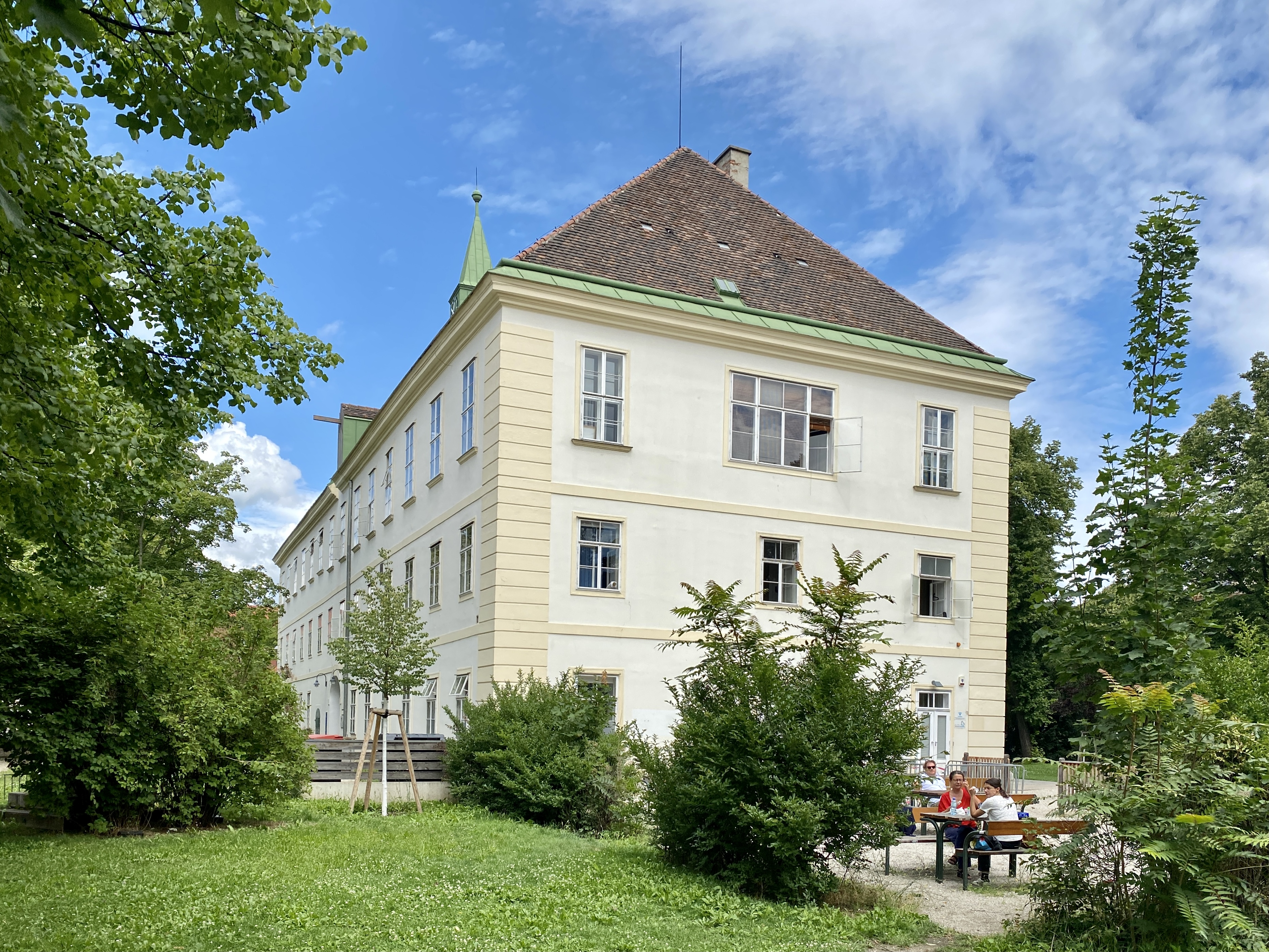
The Stöcklgebäude in Courtyard 1, the oldest building on the campus.

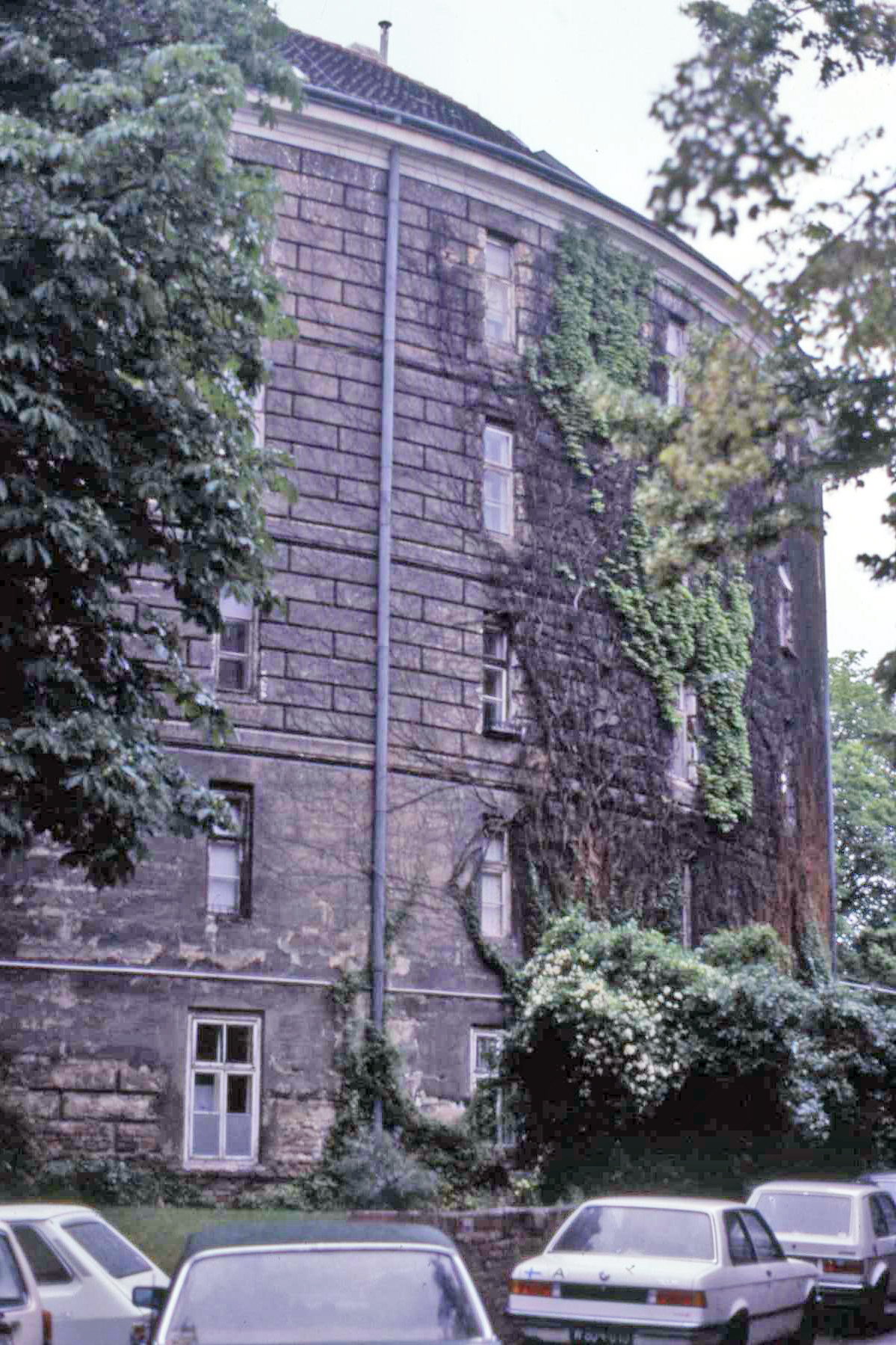
The Narrenturm in 1983

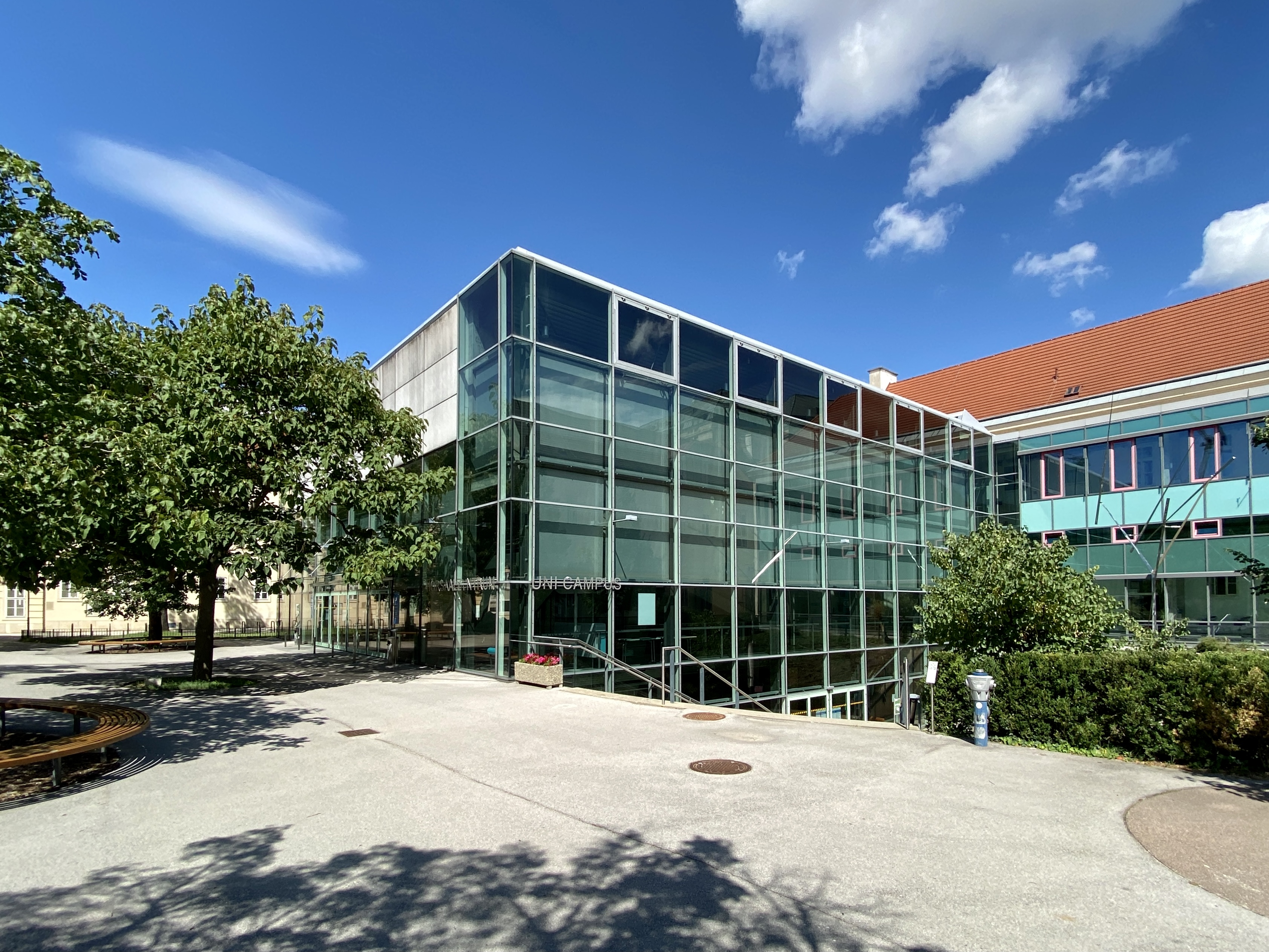
The lecture hall centre in Courtyard 2

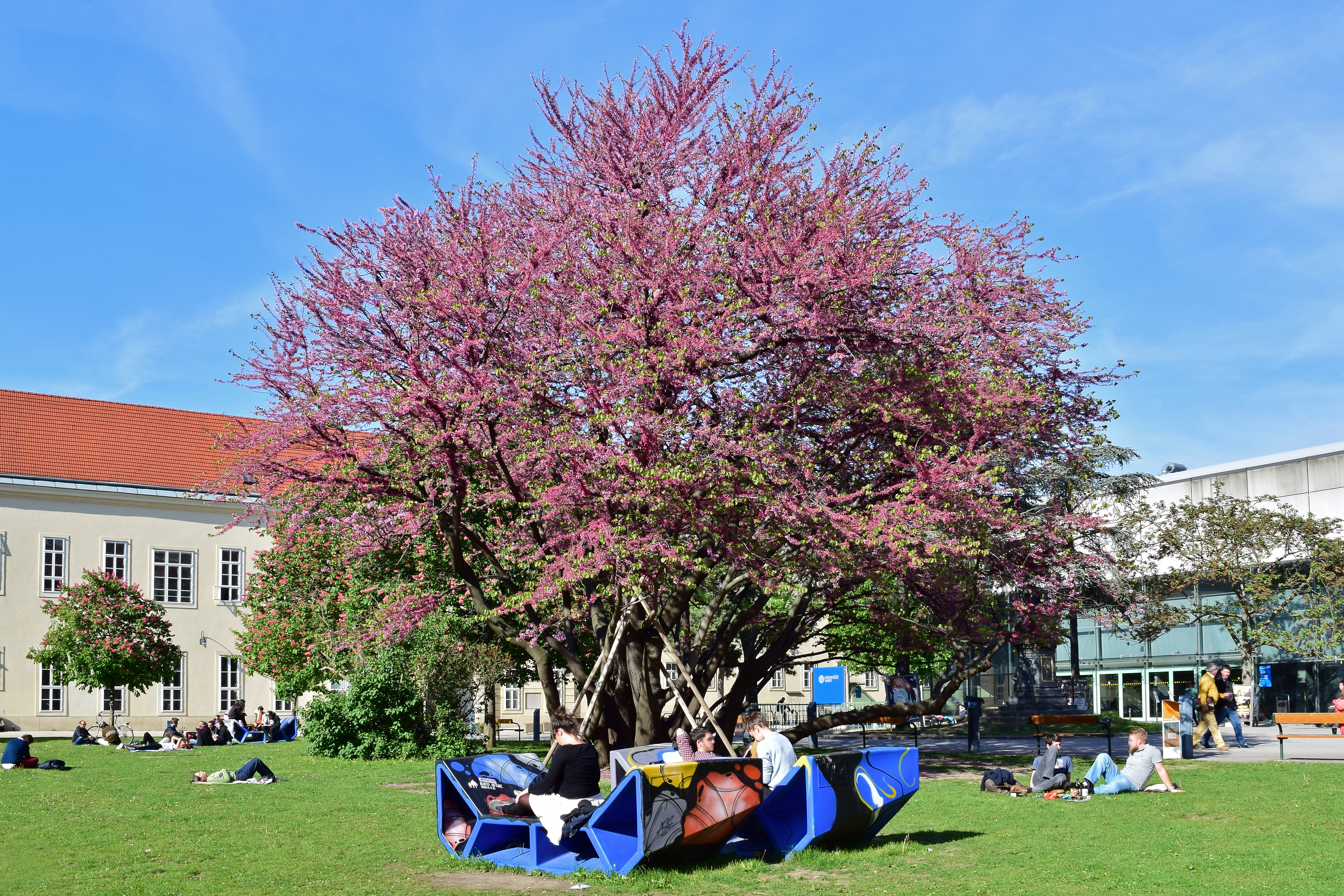
Courtyard 2 with a protected Judas tree

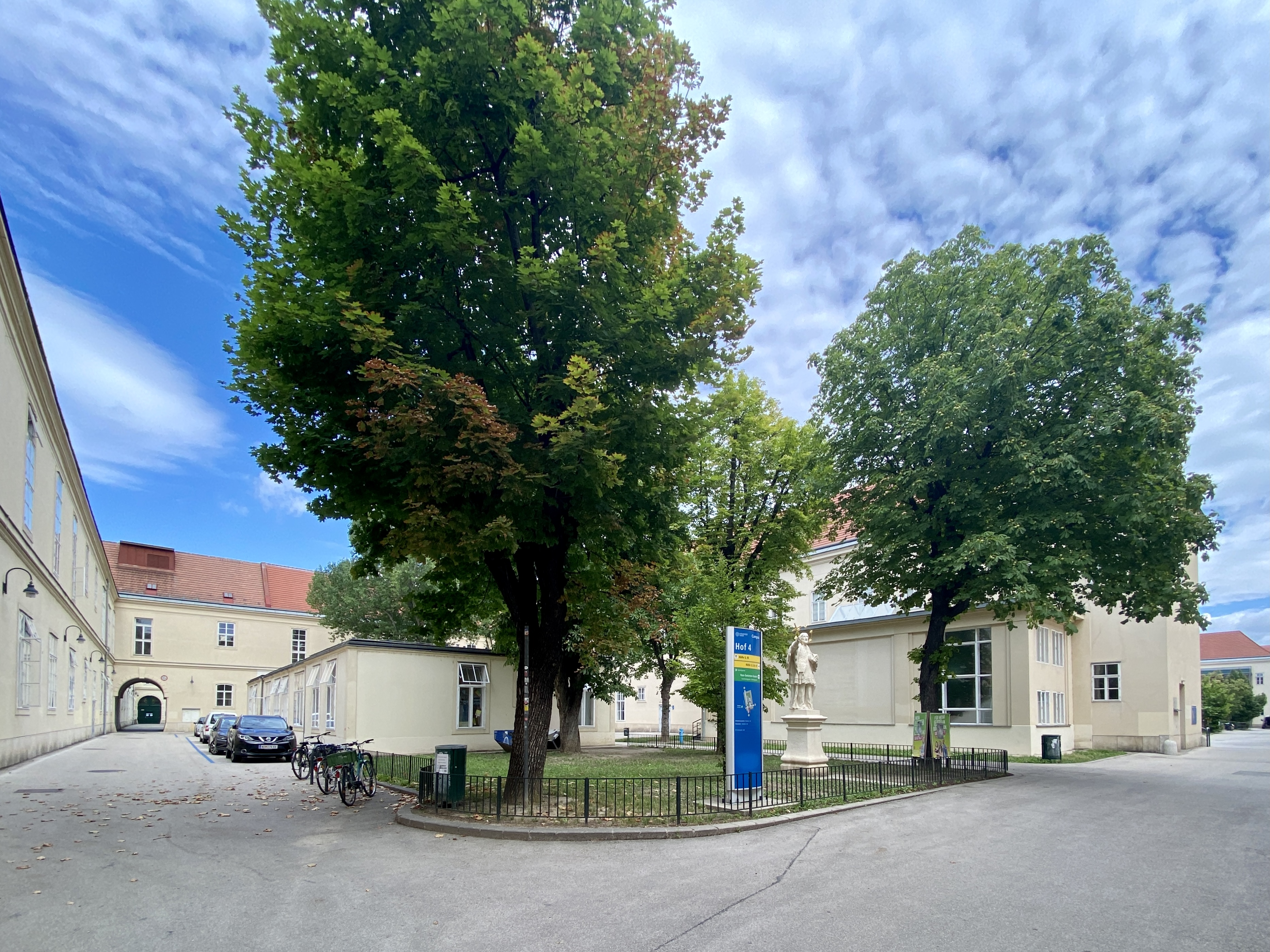
Courtyard 4

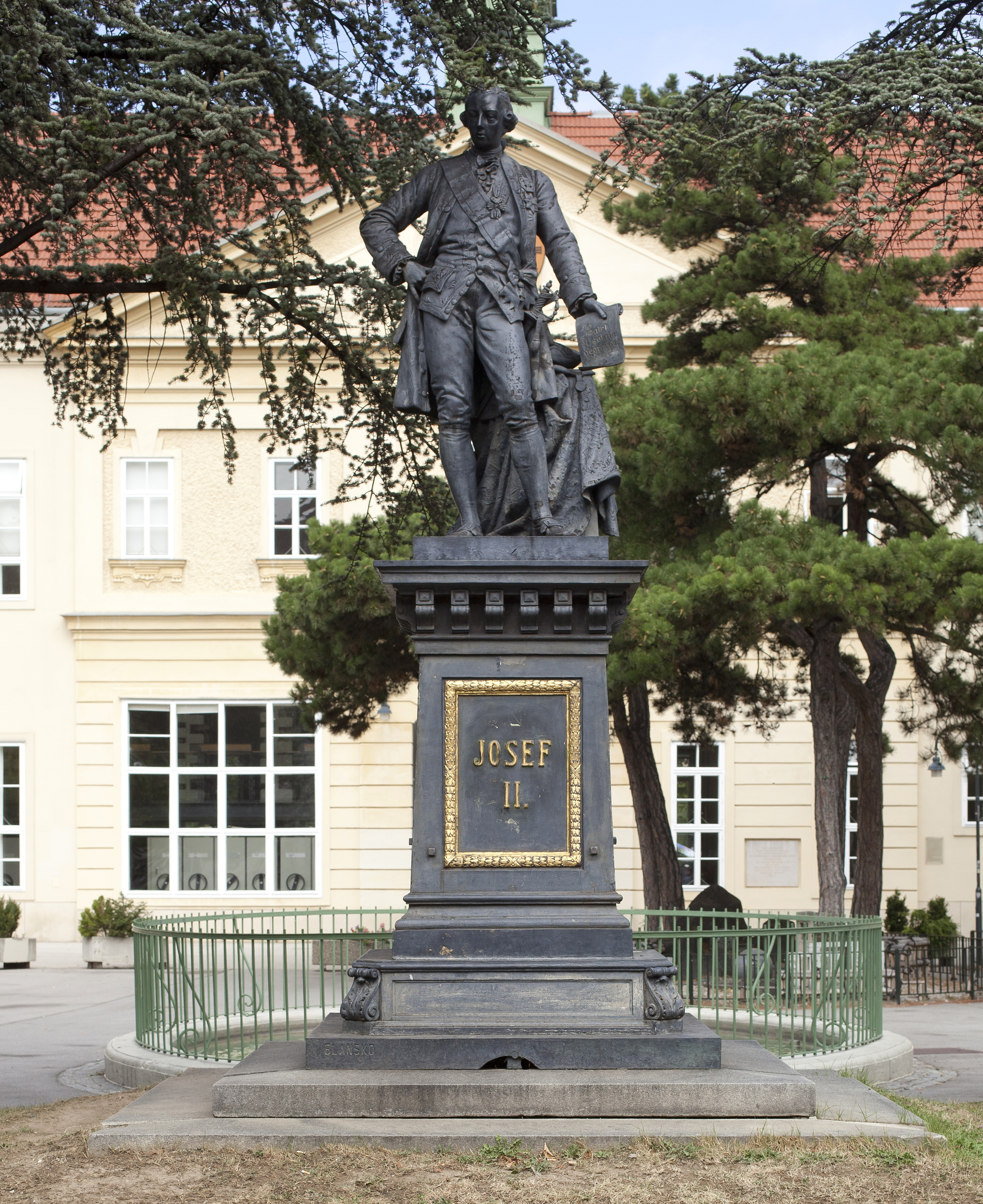
Memorial to Joseph II

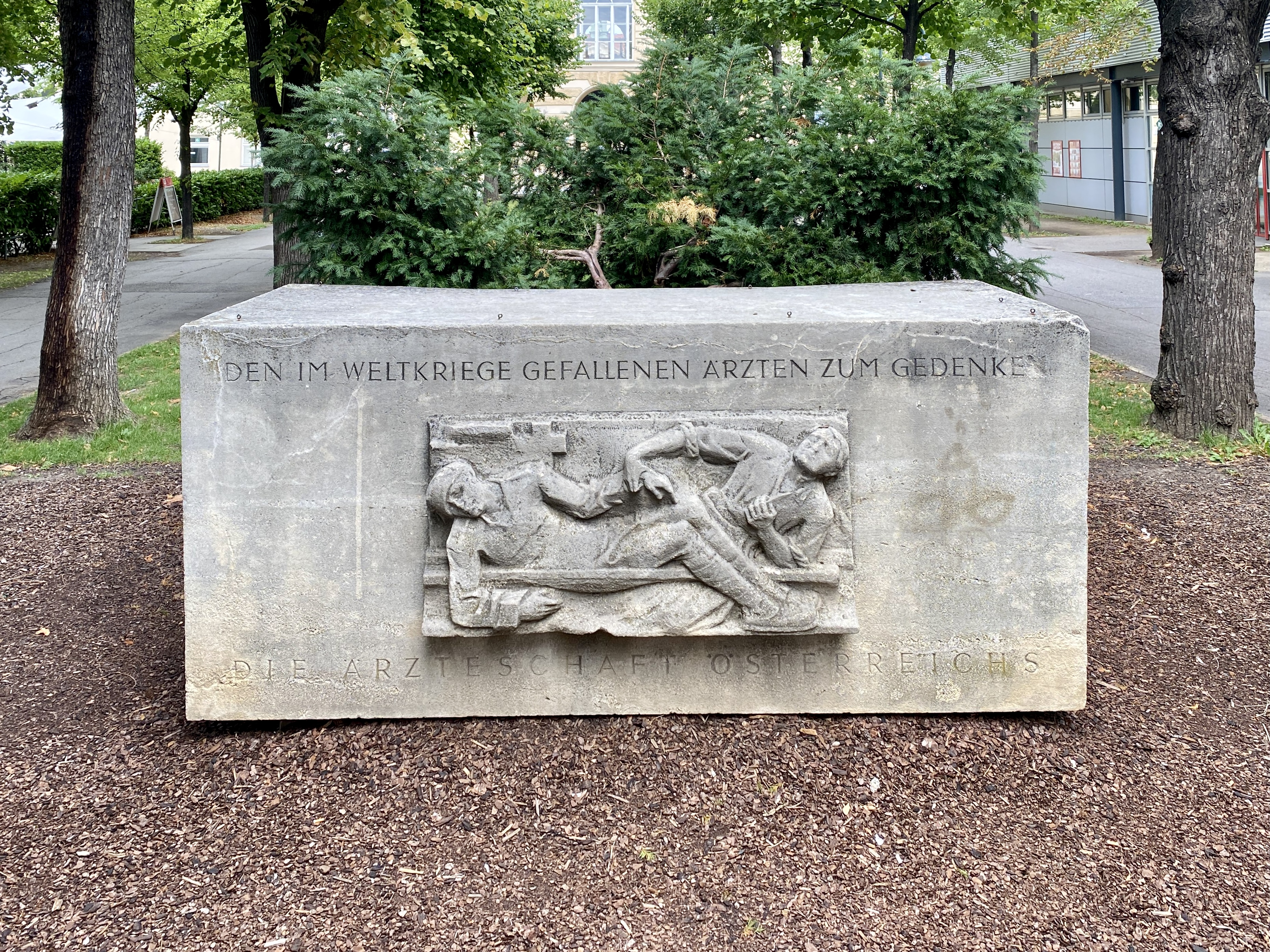
Physicians' War Memorial
