= Michelbeuern =

Coordinates: 48.2219°N 16.3511°E

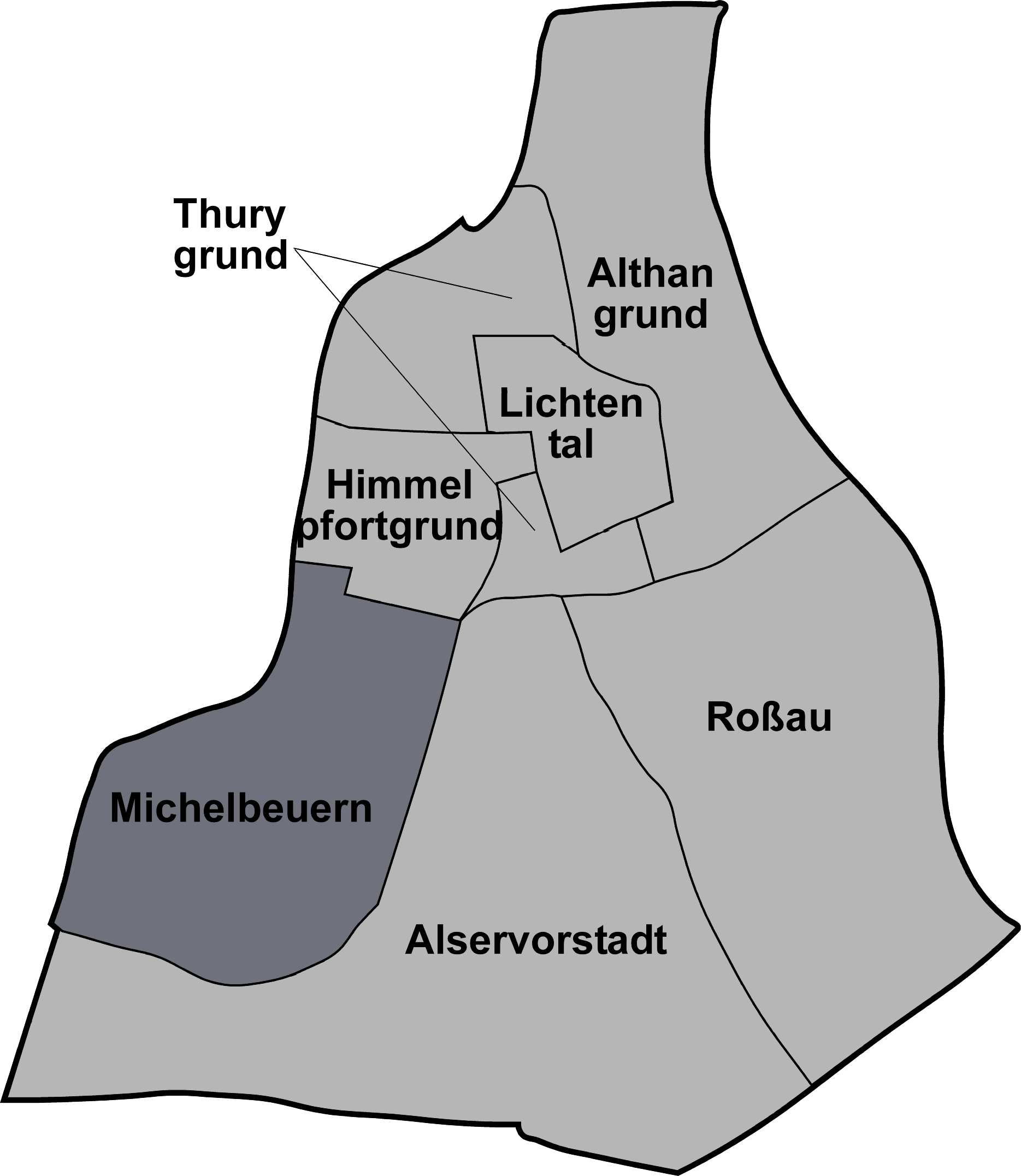
- Category: neighborhood
- Location: Vienna, Austria
- Found in: Alsergrund
- Created: 1072

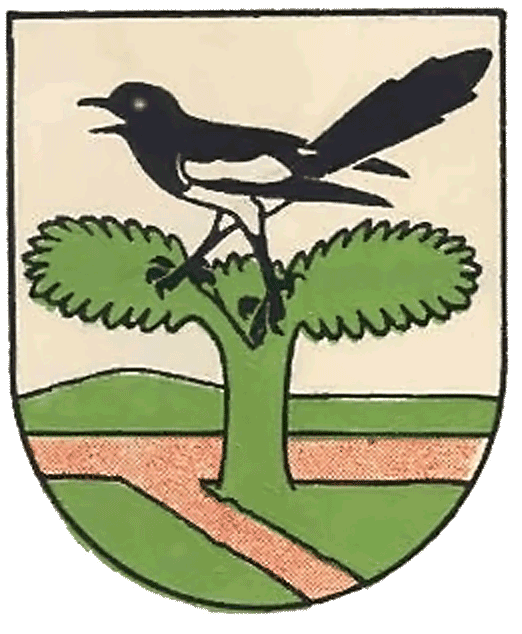
Coat of Arms

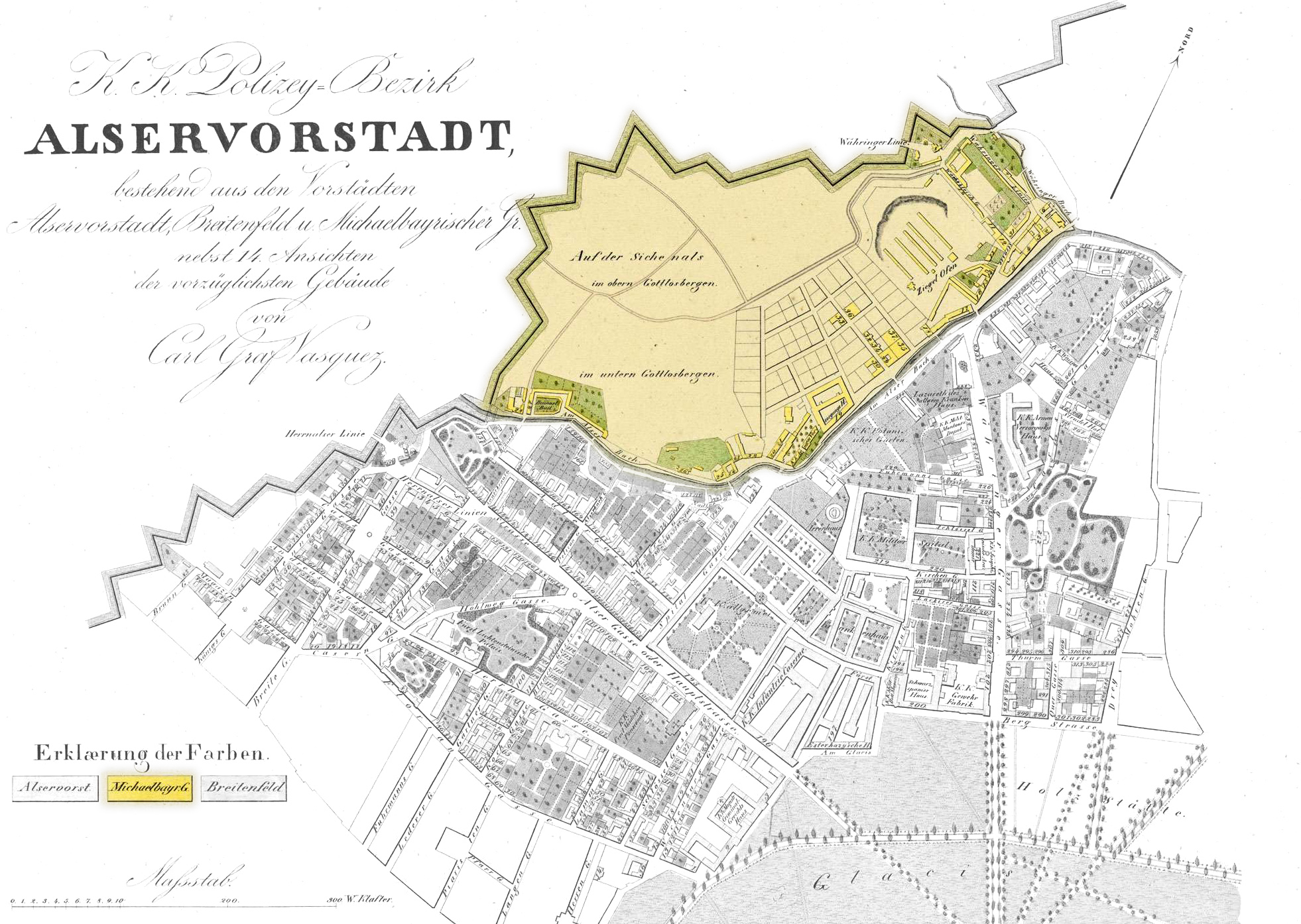
Michelbeuern ca. 1830

Michelbeuern is a neighbourhood of the Alsergrund, the 9th district of Vienna. Today, the major part of its area is dedicated to the Vienna General Hospital.

The name Michelbeuern can be traced back to the Benedictine monastery of Michelbeuren in Salzburg. Its possessions in the Vienna area were mentioned in 1072 as Hof zu Waring. They comprised vineyards, meadows and forests mainly located in the area of today's Währing. In 1704, with the construction of the Linienwall (the city fortifications that preceded today's Gürtel ringroad), the current area of Michelbeuren was separated from the Währing and was integrated into Alservorstadt. Apart from the Linienwall in the west, the area was confined by the river Als in the south and Währing river in the north. During ecclesial reforms under Joseph II., the monastic possessions were ceded to the city of Vienna for 10,000 guilders.

The area remained sparsely developed until the mid-19th century. The Brünnlbad baths and Brünnlmühle mill were located at the Als river (today's Lazarettgasse). The north housed a Vienna toll office (Verzehrungssteuer-Linienamt) while the center served mainly for brick production.

In 1836, the steam engine producer k.k. privilegierte Dampfmaschinenfabrik AG was founded in Eisengasse (today's Wilhelm-Exner-Gasse). In 1848–1853, the elevated area of Michelbeuern saw the construction of the psychiatric institution Niederösterreichische Landesirrenanstalt by architect Ferdinand Fellner. The building continued to serve this purpose until it was demolished in 1974 in order to make space for the new buildings of Vienna General Hospital.
