= St. Canisius's Church, Vienna =

Roman Catholic parish church in the 9th District of Vienna, Alsergrund

Coordinates: 48°13′43″N 16°21′06″E

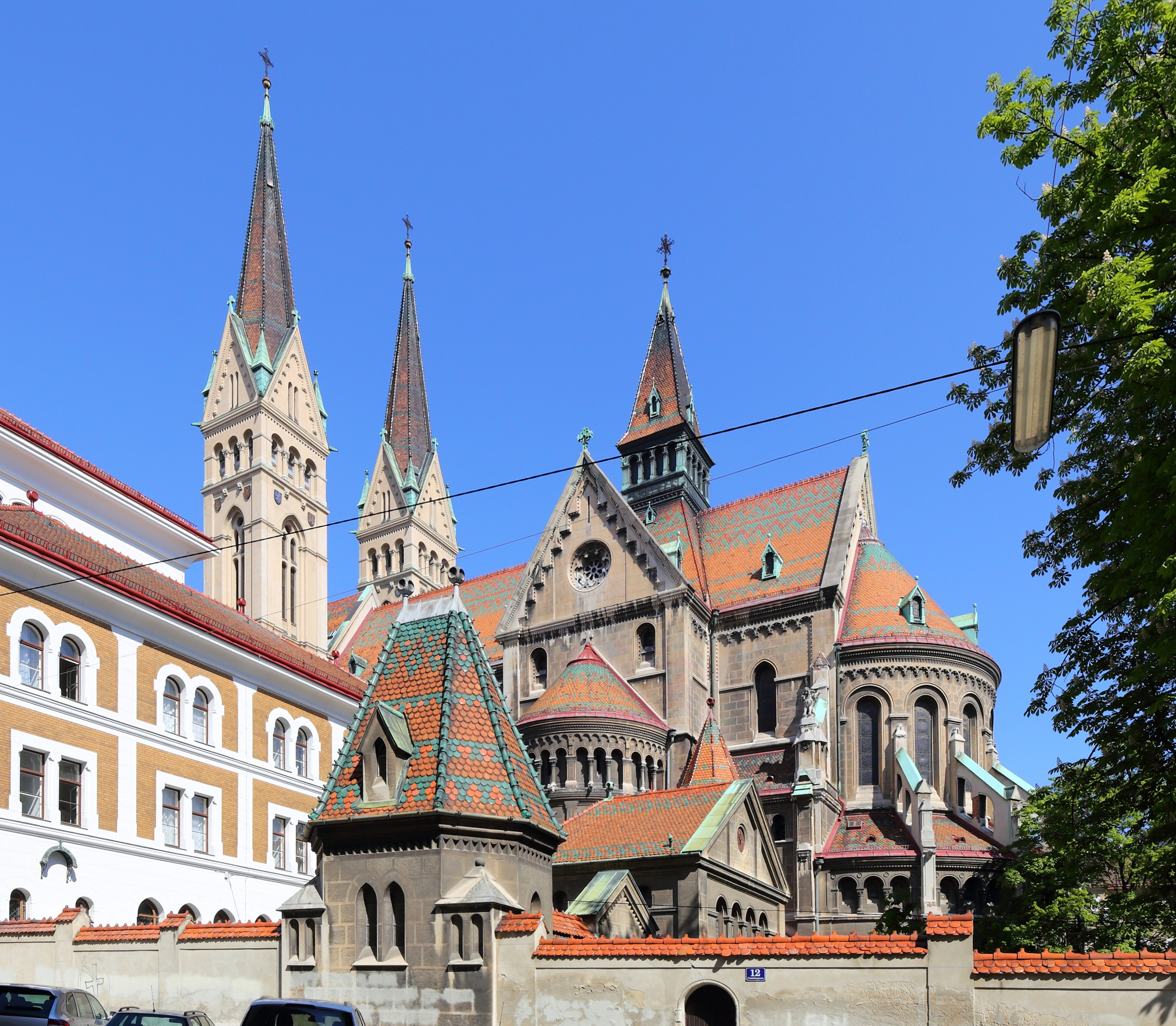
St. Canisius's Church with presbytery and monastery garden

The St. Canisius's Church is a Roman Catholic parish church in the 9th District of Vienna, Alsergrund.

== History ==
On the 4th Austrian Catholic Day (Katholikentag) in 1896, the Marianische Kaufmannskongregation (Marians Congregation of Businessmen made the proposal, to set the Blessed Peter Canisius, chaplain and Episcopal Vicar of Vienna (1553 and 1554), to his 300th Obit a fitting monument. 1897 the Canisius Church Building Association was constituted and placed itself under the auspices of Archduchess Maria Josepha, the mother of the future Emperor Charles I of Austria. On 31 July 1899, the feast of St. Ignatius of Loyola, the construction of the church began, and on 18 October 1903 it was inaugurated in the presence of Emperor Franz Joseph. In the short construction period of only three years, the massive structure was completed. Since at the time of the church building Peter Canisius, the first Jesuit of German language, not yet belonged to the blessed (canonized in 1925), the new church was not consecrated to his name. As title of ordination was therefore selected "The Suffering Savior in the Garden" and "The Painful Mother of God". Peter Canisius was canonized in 1925 and elevated to Doctor of the Church. Thus, the way was free to declare him by a decree of the Congregation of Rites to the main patron of the Canisius Church. Since 1939 the Vienna Canisius Church is the parish church for the parish of the same name.

== Architecture ==
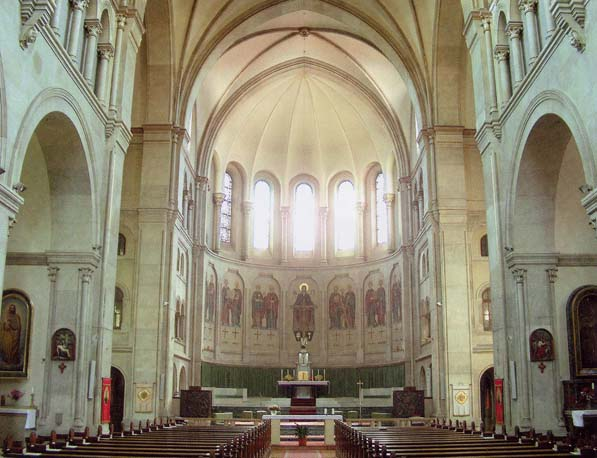
The interior of the church

The upper church was designed by the architect Gustav Ritter von Neumann. With its two 85-meter-high (279 ft) facade towers, the church dominates the entire Alsergrund. It is the fourth tallest church in Vienna. At the towers the colorful coat of arms of the most important patrons and donors are mounted. A wide staircase leads to the church porch, on the pediment in the center is a statue of Peter Canisius. In the niches to his side is to the left St. Ignatius and to the right Francis Xavier. This larger than life characters were created by Franz Barwig.

The spacious interior, a long, high hall space, presents itself as a nave with a clear transept on both sides three chapel niches being left out. The decor is typical early Gothic forms.

The entire presbytery in the course of 1956 total renovation, designed by Ladislav Hruska in gray marble - with twelve steps - has been newly built. Instead of the former altar painting "Christ on the Mount of Olives" adorn the apse wall now the by pairs represented twelve apostles in mosaic design, with Henry Tahedl providing the templates. Erwin Klobassa designed the tabernacle, the two ambos stem of Josef Papst. A treasure is located in the ambulatory: In seven niches are displayed as wall paintings from the construction period, the stations of the Seven Sorrows of the Virgin in rich colors the ceiling vaults being ornamental and heraldic decorated. The two-storey choir in the nave also bears besides the Vienna and Lower Austria coat of arms the family emblem of the House of Habsburg-Lorraine, and in the vestibule announce two marble plaques in Latin and German of the dedication of the church.

The glass windows stem from Hans Schock and show the Saints Stephen and Thomas, the Archangels Michael and Raphael, St. Francis Xavier and St. Barbara, the Apostles Peter and Paul, the Saints Aloysius Gonzaga and Stanislaus Kostka, St. Lawrence and St. Agnes of Rome and the Holy Family in the ambulatory.

Most of the tables of the side altars were adapted to the new style and overall sheathed in marble. The old altar of Heinrich Reinhart (1903) were preserved, as are the stained glass windows of the Tyrolean Hans Schock.

The niche paintings with column marble closers (Säulenriemchen - Säulenmensen) are on the left side to St. Joseph, to St. Guardian Angel and to St. Jude, on the right side to St. Ignatius, to St. Peter Canisius and to John of Nepomuk dedicated. The Holy Founder shows the motto of the Jesuits motto "OAMDG" (Omnia ad maiorem Dei gloriam/All for the greater glory of God). The patron saint of the church holds his catechism in hand, at his feet you can see children of Vienna and in the background St. Stephen's Cathedral, the Infant Jesus of Prague is located in a shrine in front of the image of the patron saint of bridges (Nepomuk).

The spacious, in Romanesque forms built lower church (crypt) was set up as a chapel and meeting room for the various Marian Congregations and dedicated to the "Blessed Virgin Mary, the mistress and protectress of Sodalists". The altar, a foundation of the Lord Congregation at the University Church in the first District, sustains in the top part a large stone "Homage to the Sodalists before the Queen of Heaven" by Franz Barwig Elder. (1902).

== Hall of residence ==
At the same time as the church, an attached presbytery with a cloister was built, that was temporarily used as a monastery. It is still owned by the Society of Jesus. Since the general renovation and refurbishment of the building in 2015, it accommodates a hall of residence for students of the University of Vienna. It is operated by the Roman Catholic association Akademikerhilfe, which was founded in 1921.

== See also ==
- List of Jesuit sites
