= Schubert's birthplace =

- Schubert Geburtshaus
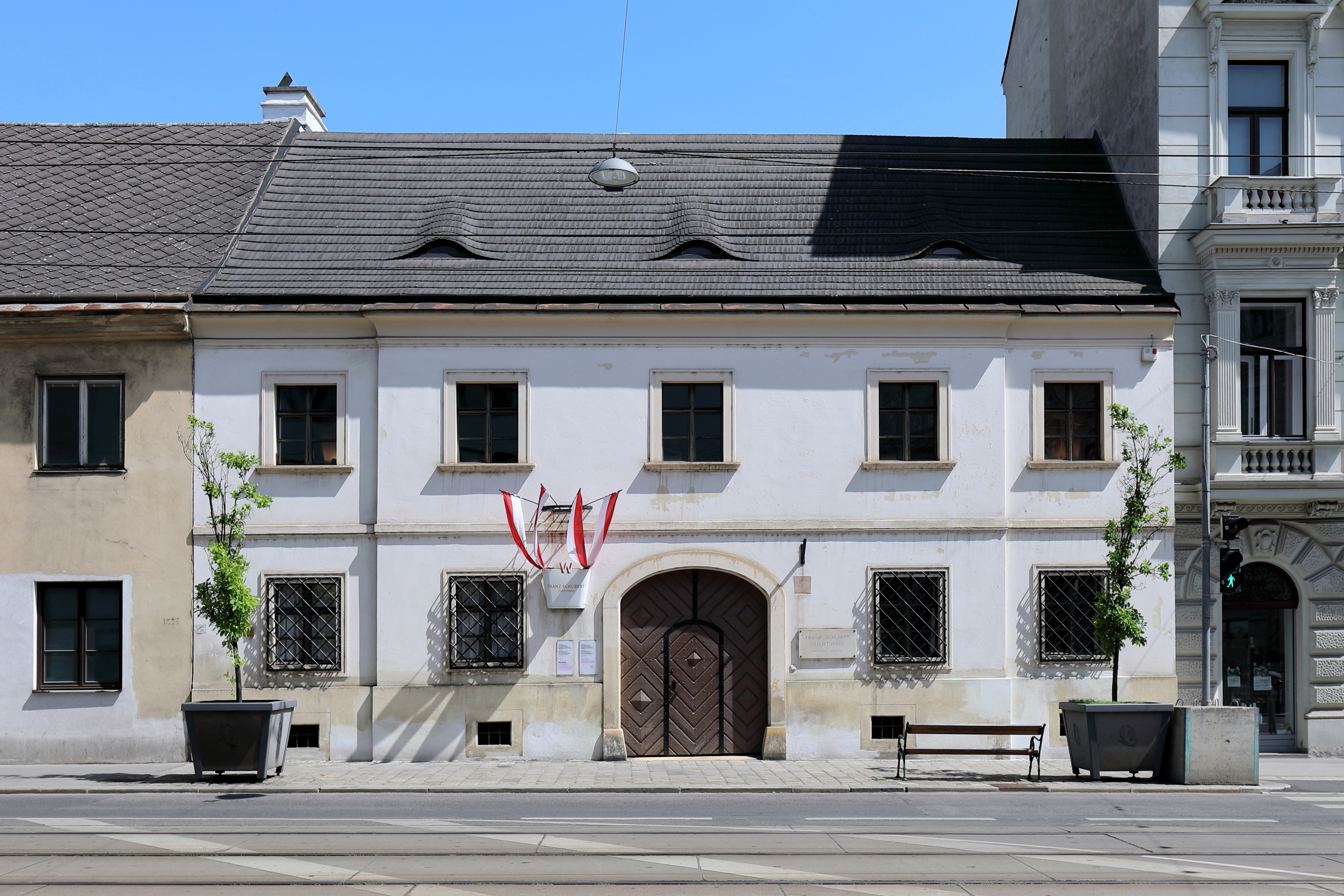
- Interactive map of the Schubert's birthplace area

General information
- Location: 1090 Vienna; Nußdorfer Straße 54, Vienna, Austria
- Coordinates: 48°13′39″N 16°21′19″E

Website
- www.wienmuseum.at/en/locations/schubert-geburtshaus

Schubert's birthplace (Schubert Geburtshaus), in Vienna, Austria, was the birthplace in 1797 of the composer Franz Schubert. Today it is a museum, part of the Vienna Museum.

== Description ==
=== History ===
The composer's parents, Franz Schubert, a schoolmaster, and his wife Maria, a cook, lived in an apartment in the house, then called Zum roten Krebsen ("The Red Crab"), in Himmelpfortgrund, a district of Vienna. Their son Franz was born here on 31 January 1797; he was the twelfth of fourteen children, of whom five survived infancy. The family lived here until 1801, when they moved to their own house in Säulengasse, a short distance away.

=== Museum ===
A large part of the top floor is now a museum dedicated to the composer: it documents his life and musical development, and his circle of friends. Among the exhibits is a pair of spectacles worn by Schubert. One of the rooms has several portraits of the composer.

== See also ==
- List of music museums
- List of museums in Vienna
