= Alsergrund =

Alsergrund Oisagrund (Bavarian)
- District
- Coat of arms

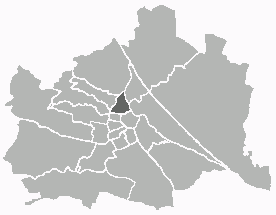
- Location of the district within Vienna
- Country: Austria
- City: Vienna

Government
  - District Director: Mag. Ahmad Saya (SPÖ)
  - First Deputy: Mag. Thomas Liebich (SPÖ)
  - Second Deputy: Monika Kreutz (Green)
  - Representation (40 Members): SPÖ 15, Greens 11, NEOS 5, ÖVP 4, FPÖ 3, KPÖ 2

Area
  - Total: 2.99 km^{2} (1.15 sq mi)

Population (2016-01-01)
  - Total: 43,342
  - Density: 14,500/km^{2} (37,500/sq mi)
- Postal code: A-1090
- Address of District Office: Wilhelm-Exner-Gasse 5 A-1090 Wien
- Website: www.wien.gv.at/bezirke/alsergrund/

Alsergrund (Austrian German pronunciation: [ˈalsɐˌɡrʊnd]; Viennese: Oisagrund) is the ninth district of Vienna, Austria (German: 9. Bezirk, Alsergrund). It is located just north of the first, central district, Innere Stadt. Alsergrund was incorporated in 1862, with seven suburbs. As a central district, the area is densely populated. According to the 2001 census, there were 37,816 inhabitants over 2.99 square km (1.15 sq. mi).

Many departments of the University of Vienna (main university), TU Wien and the University of Natural Resources and Life Sciences (BOKU) are located in Alsergrund. Until 2013, Vienna University of Economics and Business (Wirtschaftsuniversität Wien) was also located in the 9th district, but eventually moved to the 2nd district. There are also many large hospitals, including the biggest in Vienna, the AKH (Allgemeines Krankenhaus, "General Hospital").

Alsergrund is associated with many notable names of Viennese art and science. It is the birthplace of Romantic composer Franz Schubert. Classic music composer Ludwig van Beethoven died here in his apartment at Schwarzspanierstraße 15. Berggasse 19 is the former residence and office of Sigmund Freud. It was Freud's home from 1891 until his flight to England in 1938, and is currently the site of the Vienna Sigmund Freud Museum. Most of the patients Freud treated during the development of his theories of psychoanalysis visited him at his Alsergrund office.

In addition, the park in front of the Votivkirche, on the corner of Währingerstrasse and Schottenring, was named after Freud, in memory of his frequent visits there.

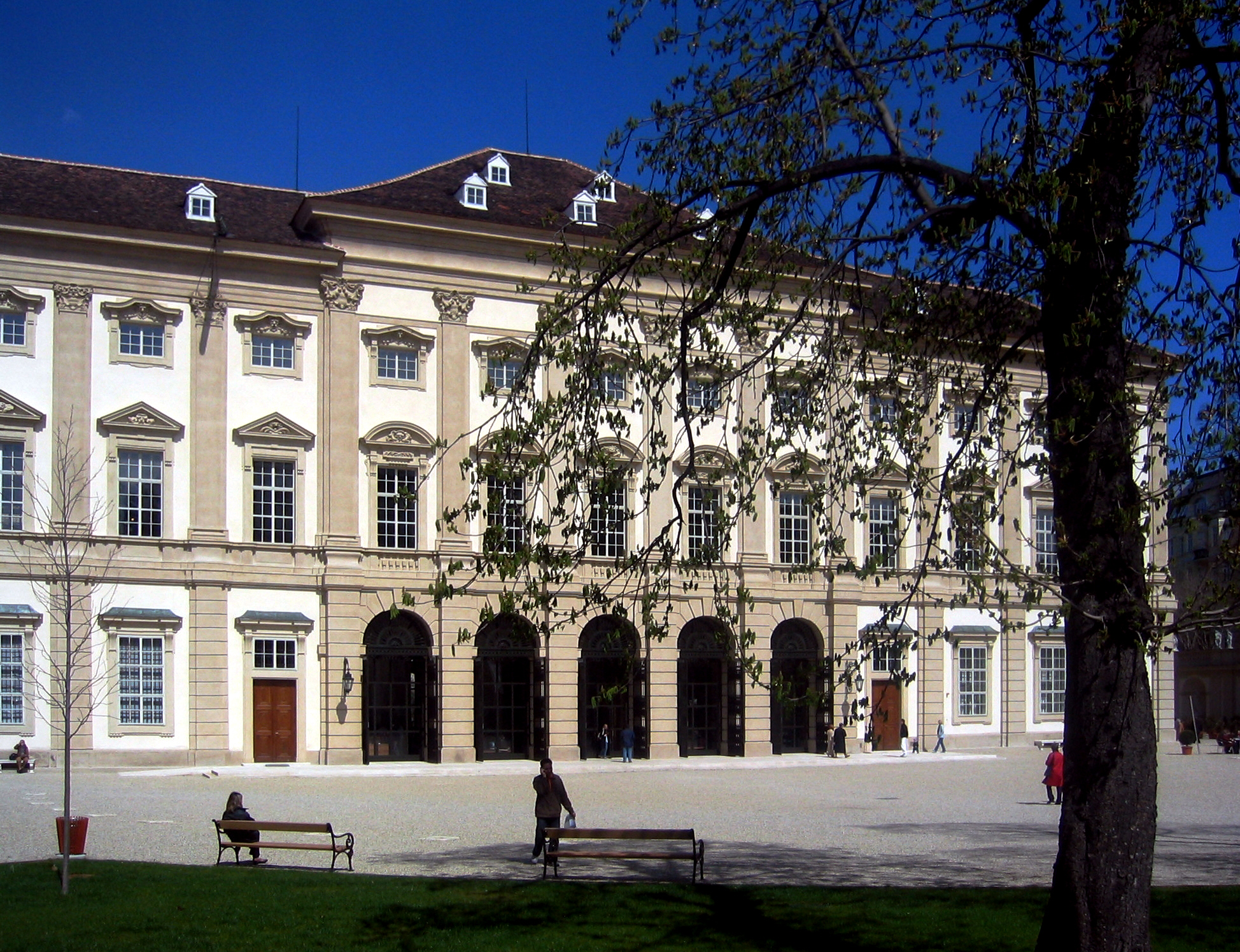
Liechtenstein Museum (Alsergrund, Vienna).

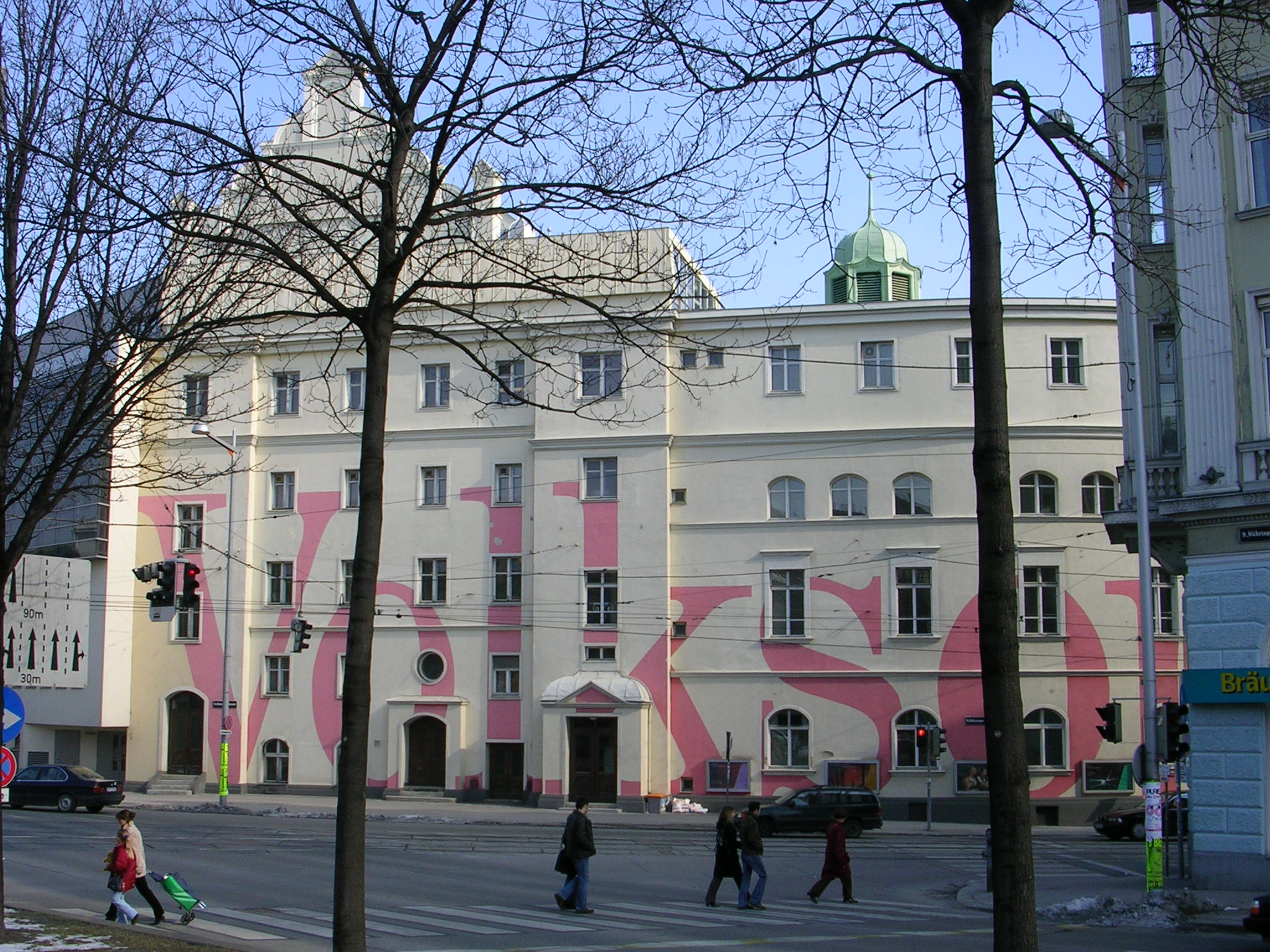
Volksoper, an opera house in Alsergrund.

== Geography ==
Alsergrund is situated in north-central Vienna. It covers 2.99 km^{2} (1.15 sq mi) making it the seventh smallest district of Vienna. North to South the district covers 2.35 km (1.46 mi) from the northernmost point of the Gürtel boulevard down towards the first district. The main east–west axis is located between Augarten Brücke and Zimmermannplatz (2 km (1.2 mi). The district is delimited by: Gürtel in the west, the Danube Canal in the east, as well as the Maria-Theresien-Straße, Universitätsstraße and Alserstraße in the south. Neighbouring districts are Döbling in the north, Währing and Hernals in the west, Josefstadt and Innere Stadt in the south. In the east, Alsergrund is separated by the Danube Canal from Brigittenau and Leopoldstadt.

== Topography ==
The natural topography of the district area has been covered by centuries of construction. Alesergrund's lowest point at 163 meters can be found near Bauernfeldplatz, its highest near Michelbeuern (202 meters). The branches of the Danube played a significant part in shaping the general lay of the land.

The waterfront edge is still recognizable, through the waste ground between the Nußdorfer Straße, Währinger Straße, and Lichtenstein-Straße. There are also minor rivers: Wienerwald streams, all of which were bricked over in the 19th century. The main stream, the Als, used to cause frequent flooding.

The foothills of the Vienna Woods reach into Alsergrund. In the Middle Ages, these were used for vineyards.

== Sections ==
The Alsergrund was formed, in 1850, from seven suburbs. The names of the suburbs have remained in section names but also in the awareness of many residents. In the northeast area of the district is the Althangrund, mostly with public facilities and infrastructure constructions built, such as the Franz Josef station, the Vienna University of Economics, the geosciences, mathematics, pharmacology and biology faculties of the University of Vienna, the Transport and postal and Telegraph Directorate. In the north is also the Spittelau with the incinerator Spittelau. South of Althangrund, joins the Rossau, which is mostly covered with residential buildings. Among the main installations include Rossauer barracks, the Servitenkloster, the Jewish cemetery. Even the Palais Liechtenstein belongs to Rossau, not northern Lichtental, a residential area in the parish.

In the south is the Alser suburb, whose southern part was added to the 8th district, Josefstadt. The district is established, in large part, with academic institutions such as the Campus of the University of Vienna and the Medical University of Vienna. In addition, in the suburb Alser, are the Vienna University and the St. Anna Children's Hospital. In the east is the part of the Michelbeuern, whose southern part is taken almost entirely by the Vienna AKH, north of Himmelpfortgrund. The district is almost exclusively populated residential houses and also the Hera Sanatorium.

A breakdown of the district area is also in the Zählbezirken of the official statistics, in which the census district of the municipality are combined. The six Zähl areas in Alsergrund are Lichtental-Spittelau, Rossau, General Hospital, Nußdorferstraße-Volksoper, Liechtenstein Street, and University Quarter.

== Education ==
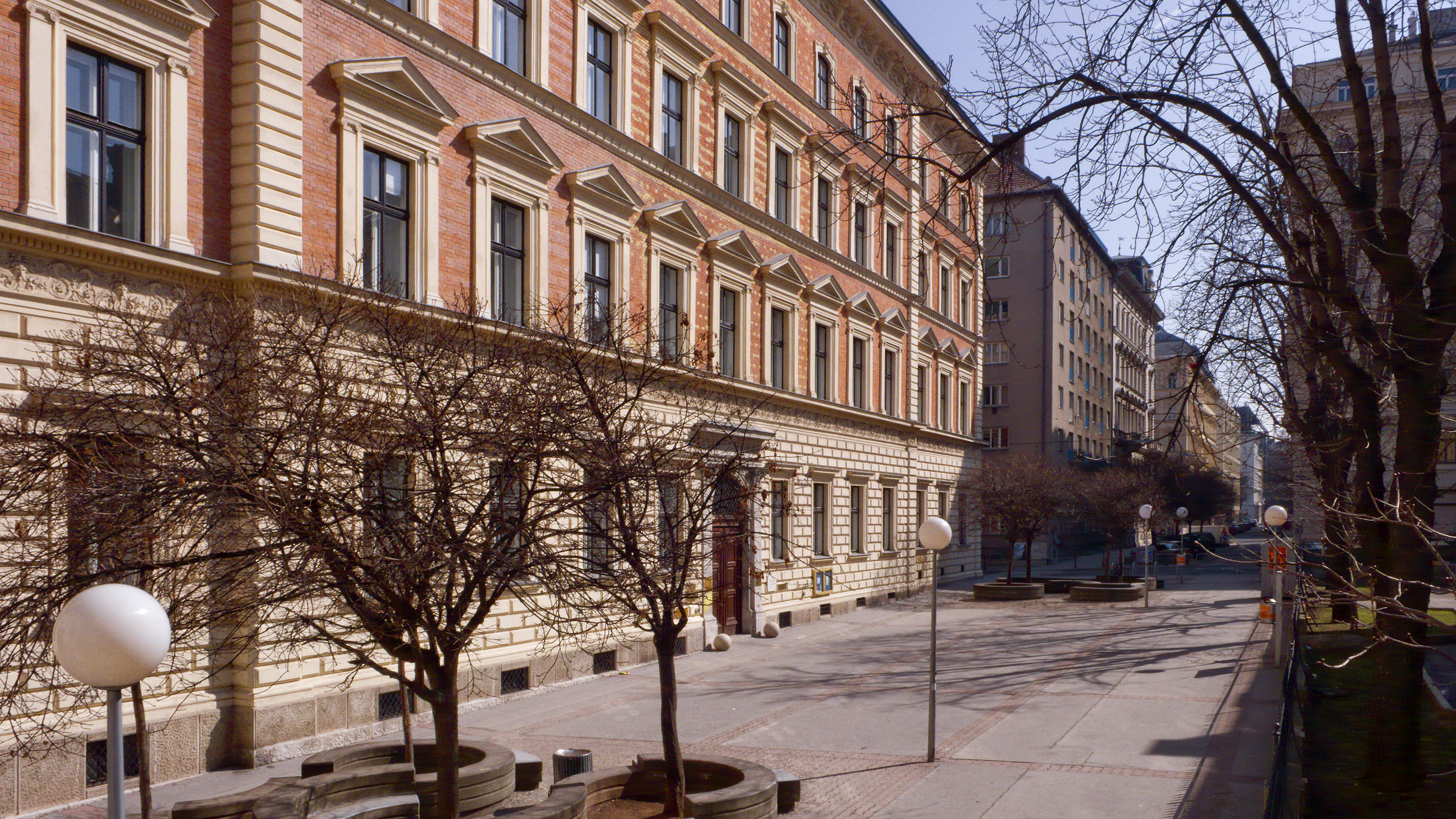
Gymnasium Wasagasse

Gymnasium Wasagasse, an Austrian secondary school

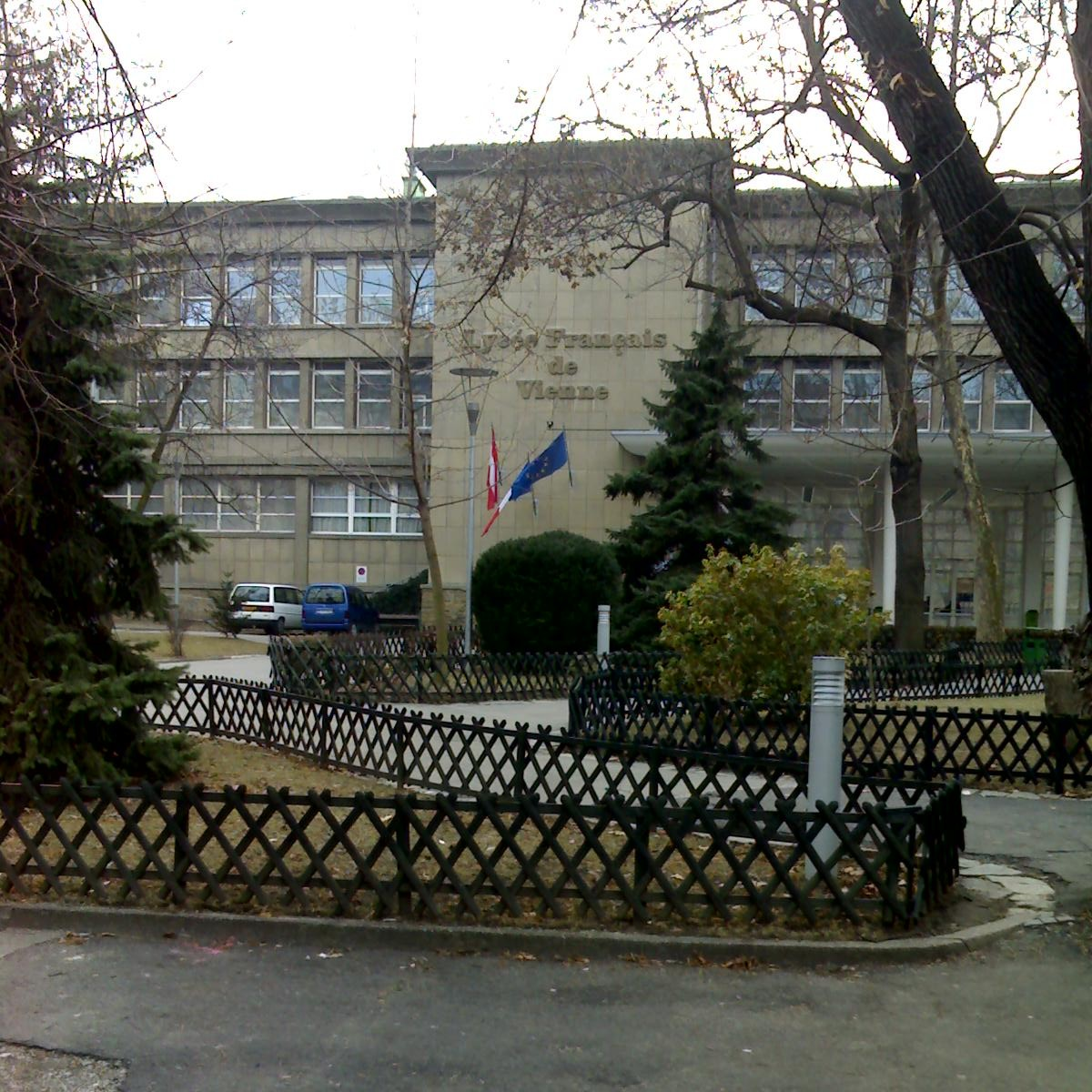
Lycée Français de Vienne

Lycée Français de Vienne, a French curriculum school, is located in Alsergrund.

== Notable residents ==
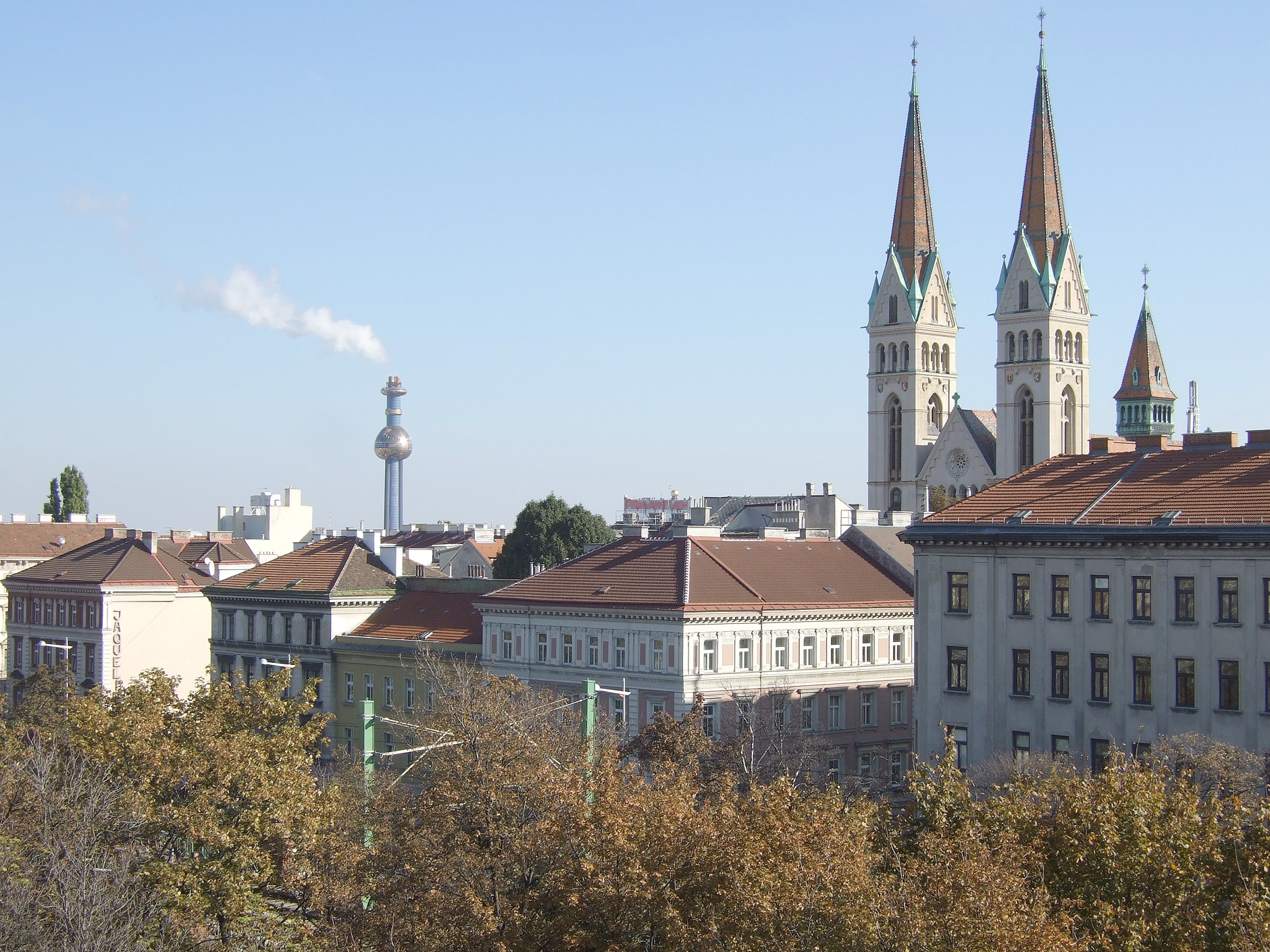
View over Alsergrund (Canisiuskirche and Spittelau).

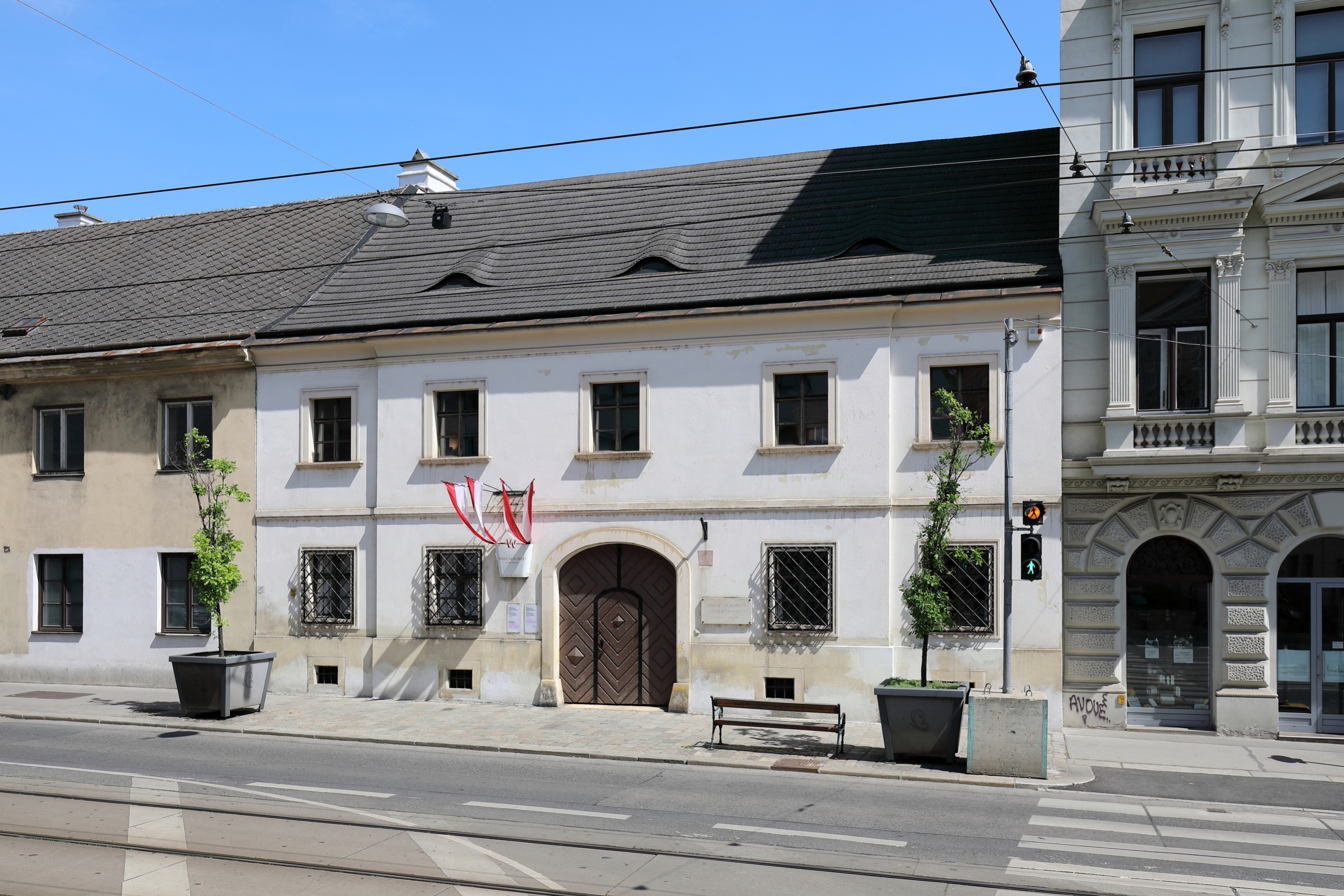
Franz Schubert's Birthplace.

- Peter Alexander (1926–2011), actor, singer and entertainer
- Franz Alt (1821–1914), landscape painter
- Rudolf von Alt (1812–1905)
- Ludwig van Beethoven (1770–1827), German composer and pianist, lived and died here
- Heimito von Doderer (1896–1966), writer, lived and died here
- Karl Farkas (1893–1971), actor and cabaret performer
- Viktor Frankl (1905–1997), neurologist and psychiatrist
- Sigmund Freud (1856–1939), neurologist who founded the discipline of psychoanalysis, lived here
- Erich Fried (1921–1988), poet
- Eugene Gendlin (1926–2017), philosopher and psychologist
- Theodor Herzl (1860–1904), Jewish Austro-Hungarian journalist and the father of modern political Zionism, lived here
- Franz Löblich (1827–1897), entrepreneur
- Franz Matsch (1861–1942), painter and sculptor (Art Nouveau)
- Jörg Mauthe (1924–1986), journalist, writer and politician
- Wolfgang Amadeus Mozart (1756–1791), composer of the Classical era, lived here in 1788/89
- Günther Paal (born 1962), Kabarett artist
- Leo Perutz (1882–1957), Austrian novelist and mathematician
- Rudolf Prikryl (1896–1965), "three days' mayor"of Vienna in 1945, raised here
- Günther Schifter (1923–2008), journalist and radio presenter
- Arnold Schoenberg (1874–1951), lived here
- Arthur Schnitzler (1862–1931)
- Franz Schubert (1797–1828), an Austrian composer, was born here.
- Erwin Steinhauer (born 1951)
- Julius Tandler (1869–1936)
- Friedrich Torberg (1908–1979)

== Sister cities ==
- Takarazuka (Japan) since 1994
- Dongcheng District in Beijing, People's Republic of China

== See also ==
- Sigmund Freud Museum
- Strauss Museum

== Sources ==
- "Wien - 9. Bezirk/Alsergrund", Wien.gv.at, 2008, webpage (15 subpages): Wien.gv.at-alsergrund (in German).
- Felix Czeike: Wiener Bezirkskulturführer: IX. Alsergrund ("Vienna District Cultural Guide: IX. Alsergrund"). Jugend und Volk, Vienna 1979, ISBN 3-7141-6219-4.
- Carola Leitner (Hg.): Alsergrund: Wiens 9. Bezirk in alten Fotografien ("Alsergrund: Vienna's 9th District in Old Photographs"). Ueberreuter, Vienna 2006, ISBN 3-8000-7176-2.
- Hans Mück: Quellen zur Geschichte des Bezirks Alsergrund ("Sources on the History of the Alsergrund District"). Verein für Geschichte der Stadt Wien, Vienna 1978.
- Alfred Wolf: Alsergrund. Bezirk der Dichter und Denker ("Alsergrund: District of Poets and Thinkers"). Mohl, Vienna 1993, ISBN 3-900272-48-4.
- Alfred Wolf: Alsergrund-Chronik. Von der Römerzeit bis zum Ende der Monarchie ("Alsergrund Chronicle: From the Roman era until the end of the monarchy"). Vienna 1981.
- Alfred Wolf: Wien Alsergrund (Vienna Alsergrund). Sutton Verlag, Erfurt 2007, ISBN 978-3-86680-174-5.
