= Lycée Français de Vienne =

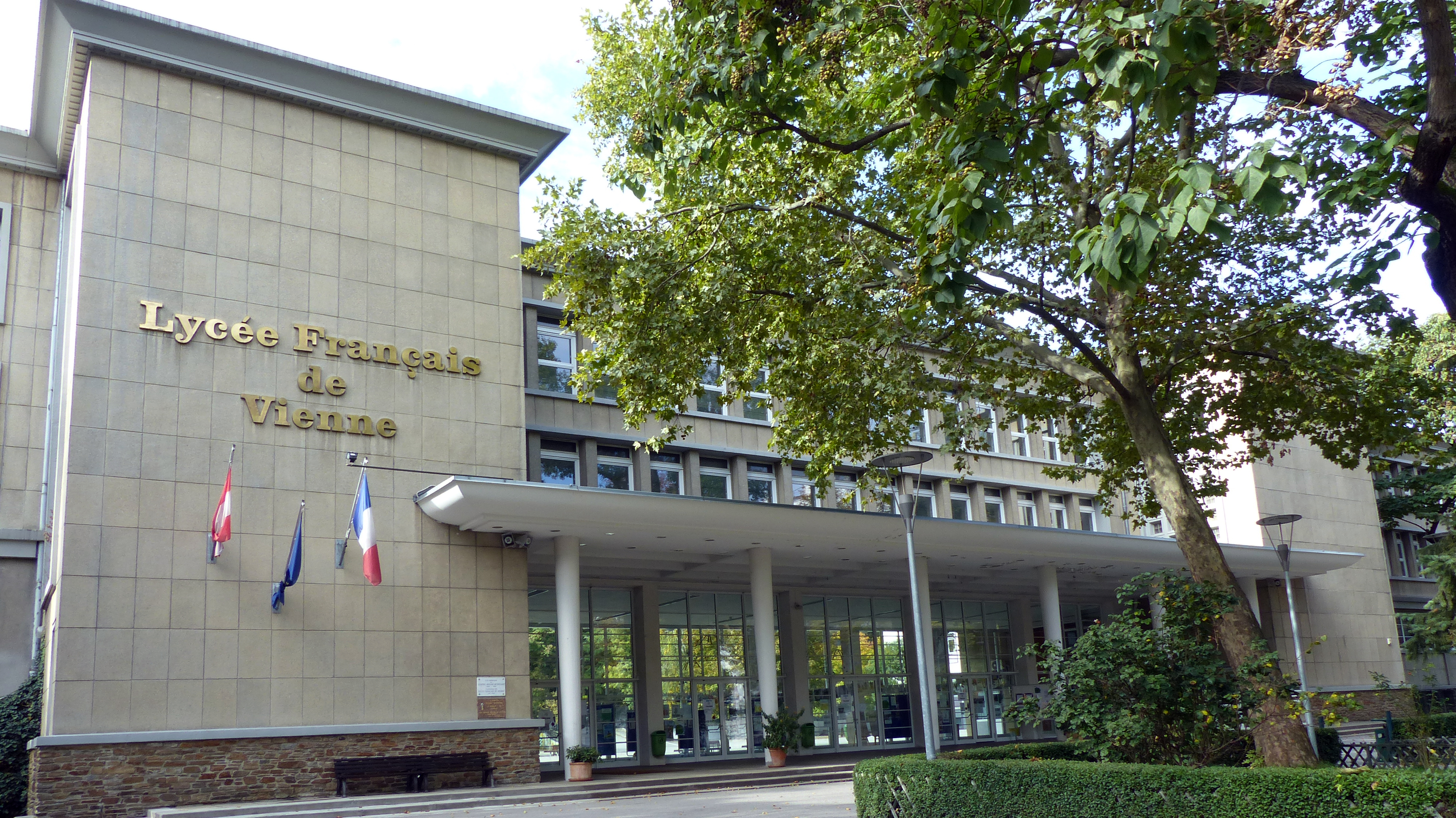

Location
- Liechtensteinstr. 37A; Vienna; Austria
- 48°13′15″N 16°21′33″E

Information
- Type: Preschool (École maternelle) through senior high/sixth-form (Lycée)
- Established: 1946
- Proviseur: Sophie Maraux
- Proviseur adjoint: Yann Kieffer
- Grades: Baccalauréat, Brevet des collèges, Matura
- Age: 3 to 18
- Enrollment: 2,000
- Website: https://www.lyceefrancais.at

Lycée Français de Vienne ("French Lycée of Vienna") is a French curriculum secondary school in Alsergrund, Vienna.

It is directly operated by the Agency for French Education Abroad (AEFE), an agency of the French government. The Lycée Français de Vienne is one of the world's largest schools accredited by the AEFE and has more than 2000 students. The private school (private from the standpoint of Austria) shares its boarding school with Theresianum.

== Academic results ==
=== French Baccalauréat ===
The Lycée Français de Vienne has the following results: Baccalauréat results 2015

Section	Number of candidates	Succeeded	%	Mention Très bien	Mention Bien	Mention Assez bien	Total honours
Literary	19	19	100	5	5	6	16
Economics and Social Sciences	47	47	100	7	17	12	36
Scientific	60	60	100	26	19	7	52
Total	126	126	100	38	41	25	104

- Percentage of honours "Mention Très Bien": 30% of the students.
- Percentage of honours "Mention Bien": 33% of the students.
- Percentage of honours "Mention Assez Bien": 20% of the students.
- Percentage of total honours : 83% of the students.

== Notable alumni ==
- Timna Brauer
- Guillaume de Fondaumière
- Mark Kidel
- Arabella Kiesbauer
- Princess Adelheid of Liechtenstein
- Christoph Matznetter
- Julius Meinl
- Ariel Muzicant
- Marjane Satrapi
- Lisa Schettner
- Zoë Straub
- Toto Wolff
