= Narrenturm (asylum) =

Former psychiatric hospital in Austria

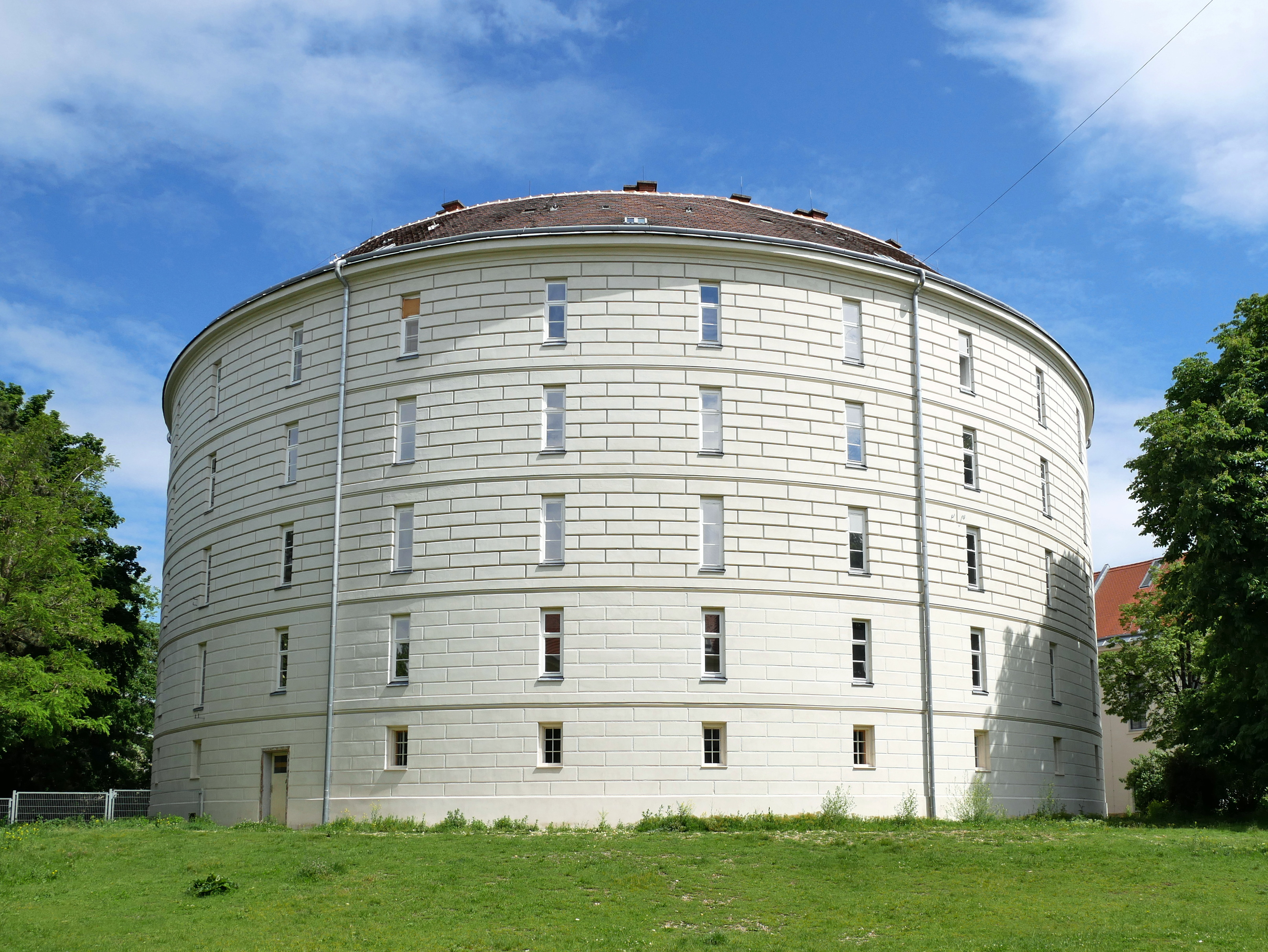
The Narrenturm (in 2019, after restoration)

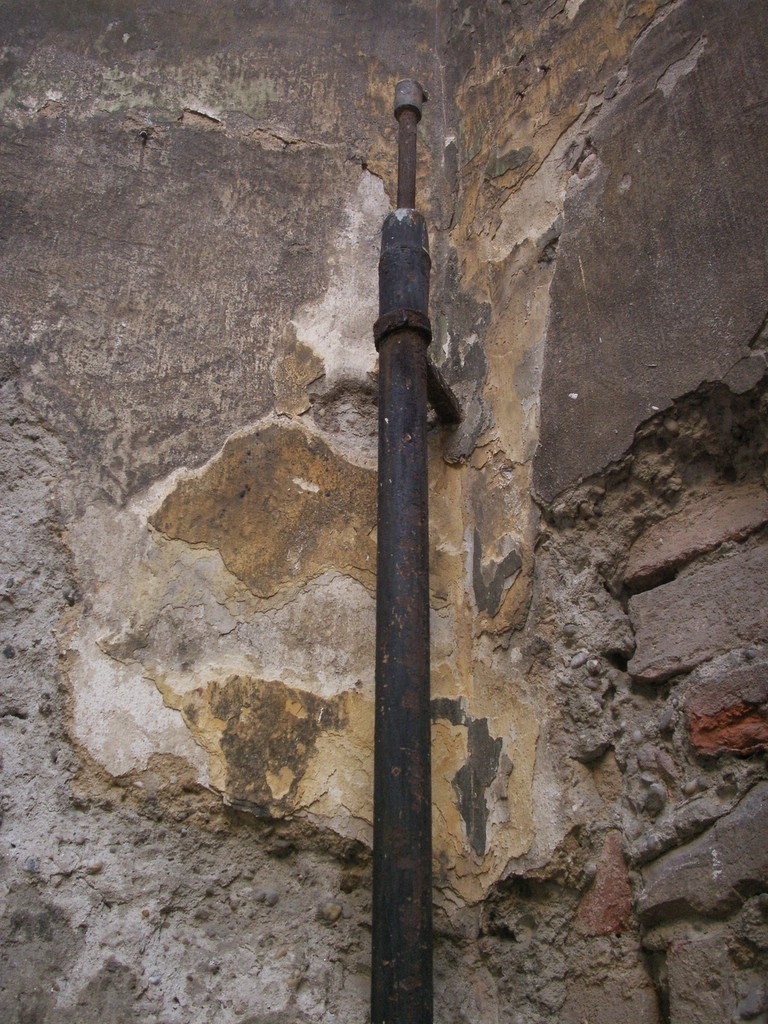
Remnants of one of the oldest lightning rods in the world, on the building's roof ridge

The Narrenturm (lit. 'Fool's Tower') in Vienna, Austria is the oldest building constructed for the accommodation of psychiatric patients in continental Europe. Built in 1784, it is on the site of the former Vienna General Hospital (German: Allgemeines Krankenhaus der Stadt Wien, AKH), currently the Campus of the University of Vienna, and is now home to the Pathologic-anatomical collection of the Natural History Museum.

== The building ==
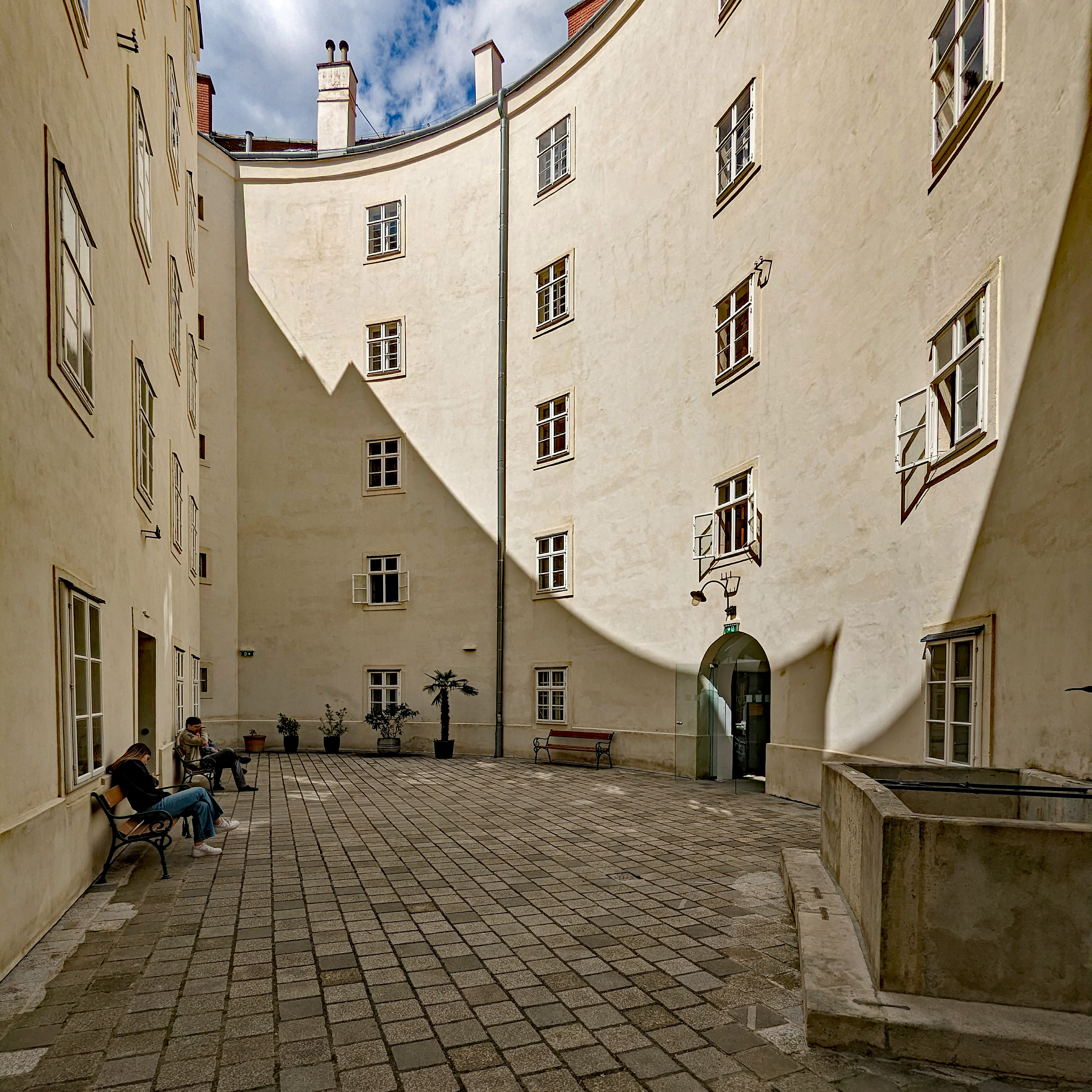
The courtyard in 2023

The Narrenturm, then interchangeably called the Irrenthurm (lit. 'Madmen's tower'), was constructed in 1784, under Emperor Joseph II. It consisted of a five-story, fortress-like circular building in classicist style with 28 rooms and a ring of slit windows, plus a central chamber aligned north-to-south. There were in total 139 individual cells for the inmates.

The building of the Narrenturm was prompted by the discovery of underground dungeons used by the Capuchin monks of Vienna for housing their mentally ill brethren; another factor was that Joseph II had learned about similar institutions in France during his travels there. The construction of the Narrenturm points to a new attitude towards the mentally ill – they began to be distinguished from the rest of society, and not simply classified among the general category of "the poor". Each cell had strong, barred doors as well as chains for restraining inmates.

The asylum was finally closed in 1869. After that it was used by craftsmen and painters who rented workshops and later as a dormitory for nurses, doctors and students working at the AKH. It was partially used in this way up until the hospital moved in 1993 and the entire building was bought by the University of Vienna.

== The museum ==
In 1971 the tower became the home of the Federal Pathologic-anatomical Museum, founded by the director of the AKH Johann Peter Frank by order of Emperor Francis II in 1796 as the "Museum of the Pathologic-Anatomical Institute", then part of the Medical University of Vienna. In 2012 the museum was incorporated into the Natural History Museum as the "Pathological-anatomical collection in the Narrenturm". Shortly thereafter work started on renovations which weren't complete until 2021 when the museum reopened to the public. Containing over 50.000 items the collection is the largest of its kind worldwide.

== See also ==
- Lunatic asylum
