= Hofburg =

Imperial palace in Vienna, Austria

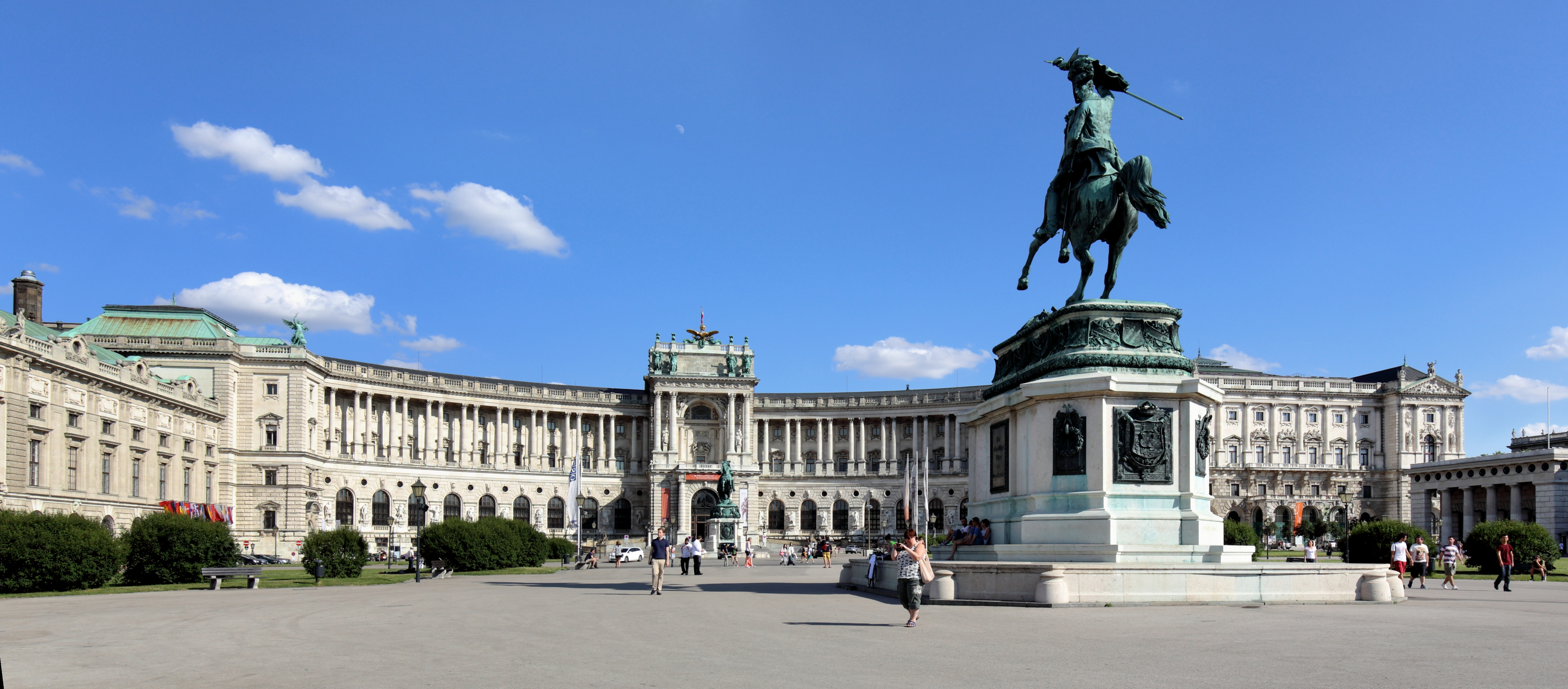
- Older castle sections (left), Neue Burg section (center of image) and Outer Castle Gate (separate on the right), in foreground the Heldenplatz.

General information
- Architectural style: Neo-Baroque
- Location: Vienna, Austria
- Coordinates: 48°12′23″N 16°21′55″E

The Hofburg (German: [ˈhoːfbʊʁk]) is the former principal imperial palace of the Habsburg dynasty in Austria. Located in the center of Vienna, it was built in the 13th century by Ottokar II of Bohemia and expanded several times afterwards. It also served as the imperial winter residence, as Schönbrunn Palace was the summer residence. Since 1946, it has been the official residence and workplace of the president of Austria.

Since 1279, the Hofburg area has been the documented seat of government. The Hofburg has been expanded over the centuries to include various residences (with the Amalienburg and the Albertina), the imperial chapel (Hofkapelle or Burgkapelle), the imperial library (Hofbibliothek), the treasury (Schatzkammer), the Burgtheater, the Spanish Riding School (Hofreitschule), the imperial mews (Stallburg and Hofstallungen).

The palace faces the Heldenplatz (Heroes' Square) ordered under the reign of Emperor Franz Joseph I, as part of what was planned to become the Kaiserforum but which was never completed.

Numerous architects have executed work at the Hofburg as it expanded, notably the Italian architect-engineer Filiberto Luchese, Lodovico Burnacini and Martino and Domenico Carlone, the Baroque architects Lukas von Hildebrandt and Joseph Emanuel Fischer von Erlach, Johann Fischer von Erlach, and the architects of the Neue Burg built between 1881 and 1913.

== History ==
General plan of Hofburg Palace. 1 Swiss Wing, 2a Augustinian Church, 2b Augustinian Monastery, 3 Stallburg, 4 Amalienburg, 5 Leopoldine Wing, 6 Redouten Wing, 7 Winter Riding School, 8 Imperial Library, 9 Augustinian Wing, 10 Archduke Albrecht Palace (formerly Tarouca-de Sylva Palace), 11 Imperial Chancellery Wing, 12 Festsaal (Festival Hall Wing), 13 St. Michael's Wing, 14 Neue Burg Wing, 15 Corps de Logis, 16 Palm House. A Inner Castle Square, B Ballhausplatz (Ball House Square), C St. Michael's Square, D Schweizerhof (Swiss Court), E Joseph Square, F Albertina Square, G Burggarten (Castle Garden), H Heldenplatz (former Outer Castle Square) Historical construction stages in colours: 13th to 17th century 18th century 19th to 20th century

The name translates as "Castle of the Court", which denotes its origins when initially constructed during the Middle Ages. Initially planned in the 13th century as the seat of the Dukes of Austria, the palace expanded over the centuries, as they became increasingly powerful. From 1438 to 1583, and again from 1612 to 1806, it was the seat of the Habsburg kings and emperors of the Holy Roman Empire, and thereafter until 1918 the seat of the Emperors of Austria. Since then, the palace has continued in its role as the seat of the head of state and is today used by the Austrian Federal President.

It is also the permanent home of the Organization for Security and Co-operation in Europe (OSCE) and also houses the Vienna Office of the Permanent Court of Arbitration (PCA).

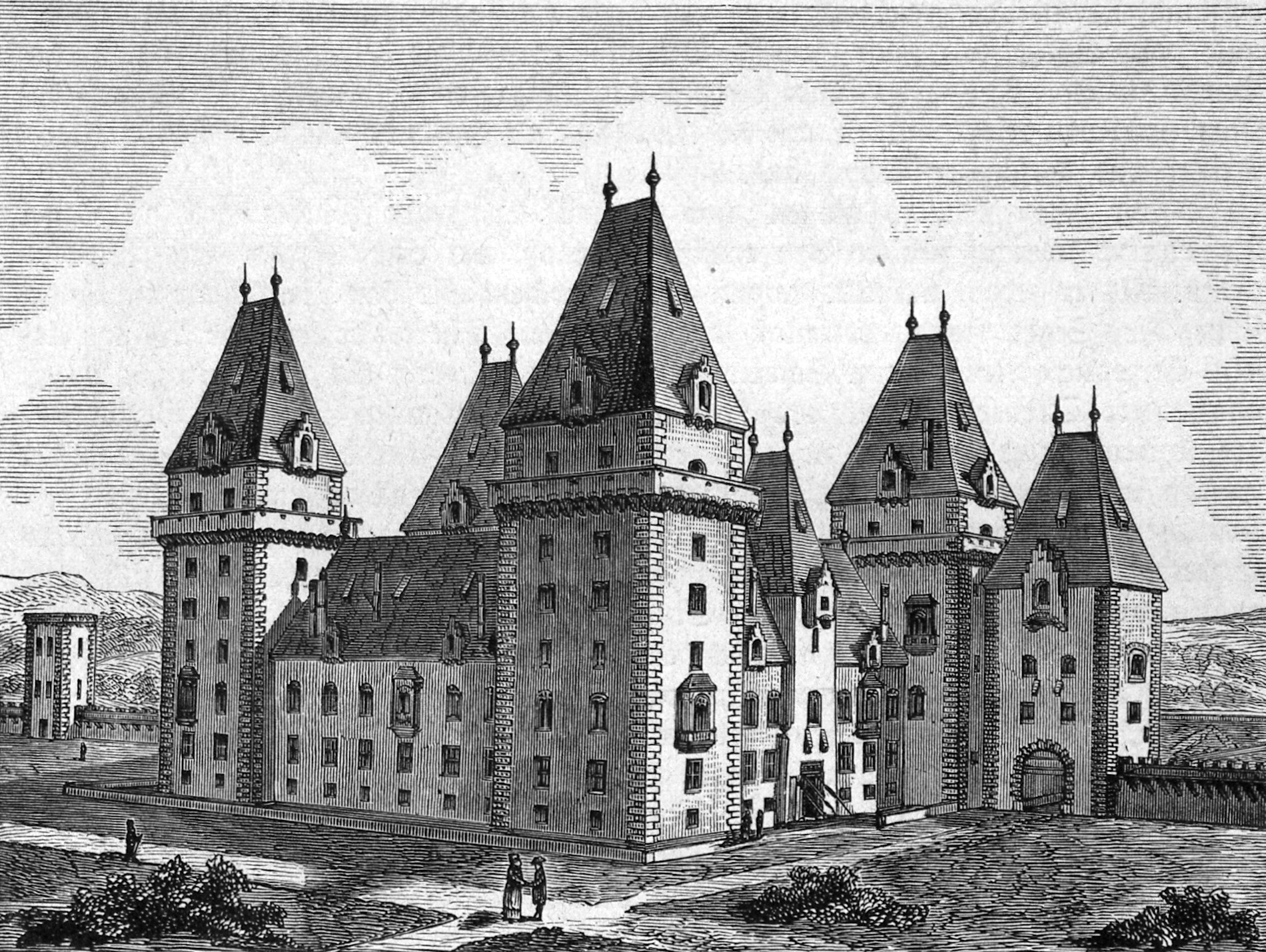
Reconstructive drawing of the appearance of the castle until the 16th century

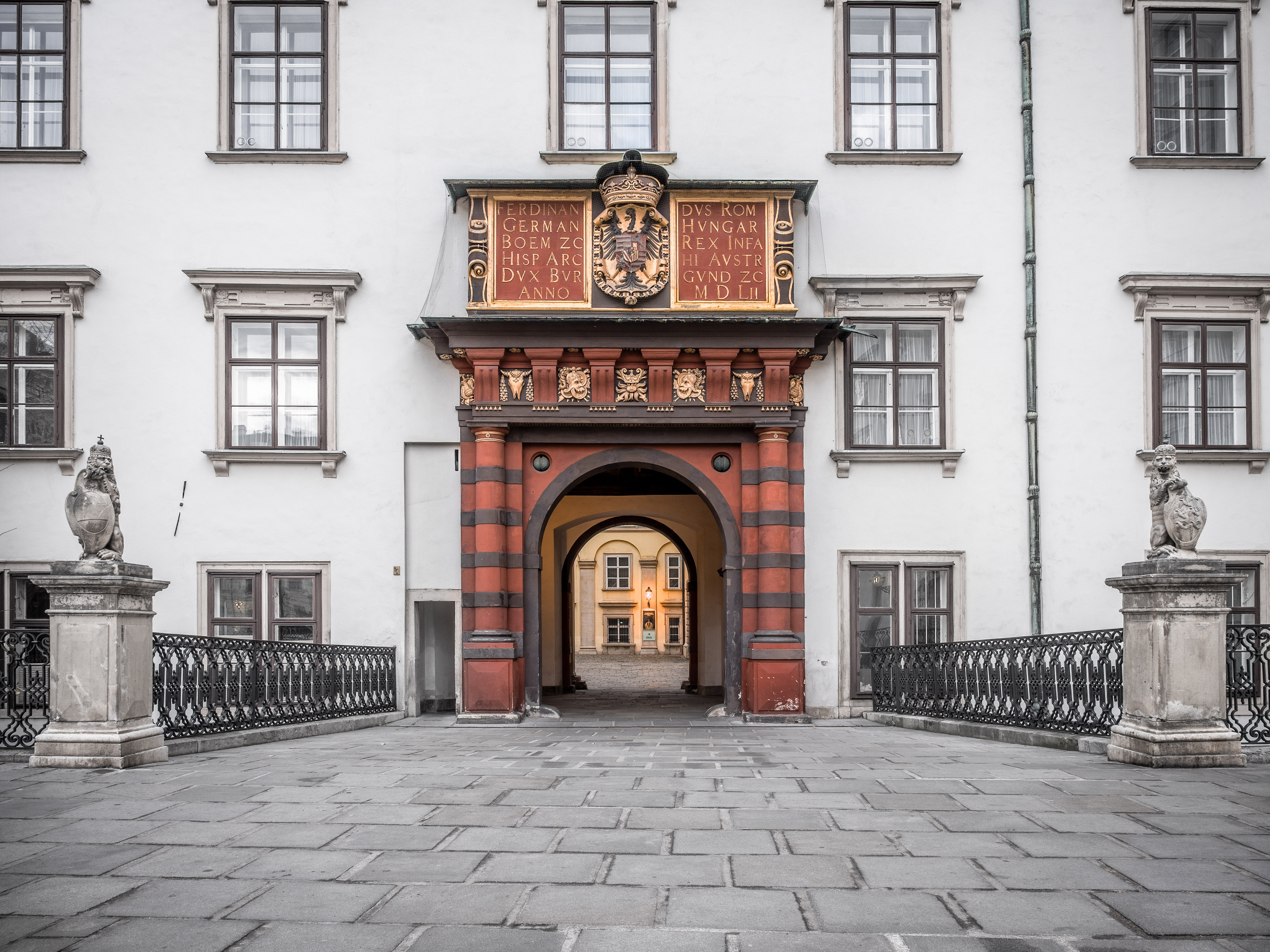
The Swiss Gate (Schweizertor), original main gate

The whole palace complex is under the administration of the governor (Burghauptmann), who in turn is part of the Burghauptmannschaft, an office which has been in existence since the Middle Ages under the auspices of the Burgrave. At present the Burghauptmannschaft is under the jurisdiction of the Federal Ministry of the Economy.

In September 1958, parts of the Hofburg were opened to the public as a convention centre. In the first ten years, the Burghauptmannschaft operated the convention centre; since 1969 a private company (Hofburg Vienna – Wiener Kongresszentrum Hofburg Betriebsgesellschaft) has been managing the international congress and events centre. Every year the convention centre hosts about 300–350 events, with around 300,000–320,000 guests. Among the events are conventions and meetings as well as banquets, trade fairs, concerts, and balls.

=== Swiss Wing ===
The oldest parts of the palace date from the 13th century and were primarily constructed by the last of the Babenbergers, or by Ottokar II of Bohemia. Before that the castle of the Austrian rulers had been located on the square called "Am Hof", which is near the Schottenstift (Scottish Monastery).

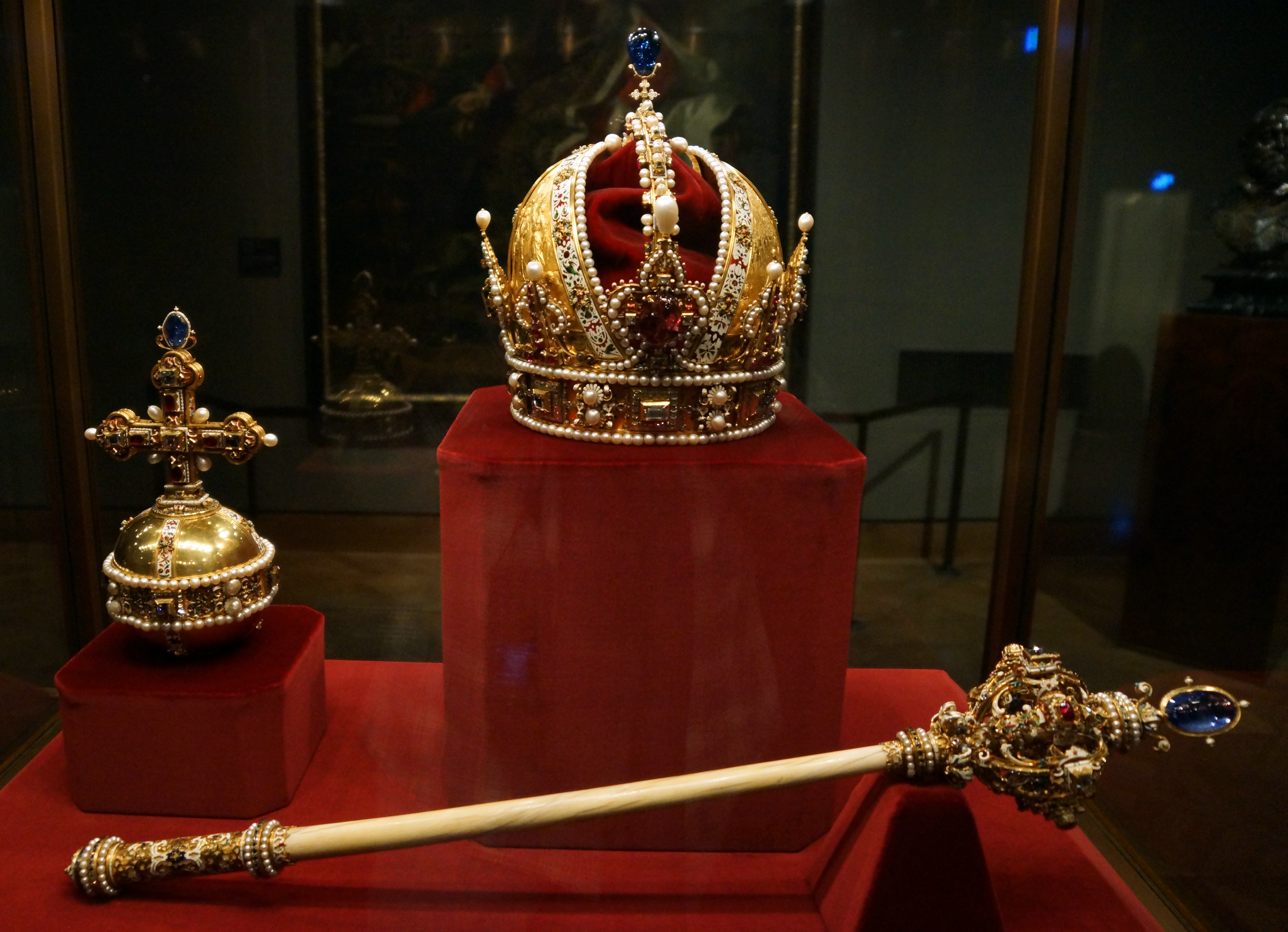
Austrian Crown Jewels kept in the treasury in the Swiss Wing of the Hofburg

The castle originally had a square outline, with four turrets, and was surrounded by a moat with a drawbridge at the entrance. These oldest sections of the castle today form the Swiss Court (Schweizerhof), where there are a gothic chapel (Burgkapelle), dating from the 15th century, and the treasury (or Schatzkammer), affiliated to the Kunsthistorisches Museum which holds, among other things, the imperial insignia of the Holy Roman Empire (Reichskleinodien) and of the Empire of Austria. The Court Music Chapel (Hofmusikkapelle) is located inside the Court Chapel (Hofburgkapelle) and is where the Vienna Boys' Choir traditionally sing mass on Sundays.

The appearance of the Swiss Court dates from the Renaissance, during the reign of Emperor Ferdinand I. The Swiss Gate entrance (Schweizertor) displays the many titles of Ferdinand I and the insignia of the Order of the Golden Fleece are painted on the ceiling.

An adjoining section of the Swiss Wing houses the Radetzky Apartments. In recognition of his services in the Italian campaign during the revolutionary year of 1848, Emperor Franz Joseph I permitted the worthy Field Marshal Radetzky to live in these apartments, even though he was not a member of the imperial family.

In the Knight's Hall (Rittersaal), on 15 May 1717 the Empress Maria Theresa was baptised by the papal nuncio Giorgio Spinola, representing Pope Clement XI, with baptismal water containing a few drops from the River Jordan.

Next to the Knight's Hall is the Guard Room (Trabantenstube), where the duty officer of the Household Guards kept watch over the emperor. The lower section of this wing once accommodated the imperial kitchen.

=== Amalienburg ===
Across from the Swiss Gate is the Amalienburg, named after Empress Amalie Wilhelmine, the widow of Joseph I. However, this wing had already been in use for more than a century, constructed as the residence of Emperor Rudolph II in the style of the late Renaissance. Of note is the small tower with its cupola and the astronomical clock on its façade.

=== Leopoldine Wing ===
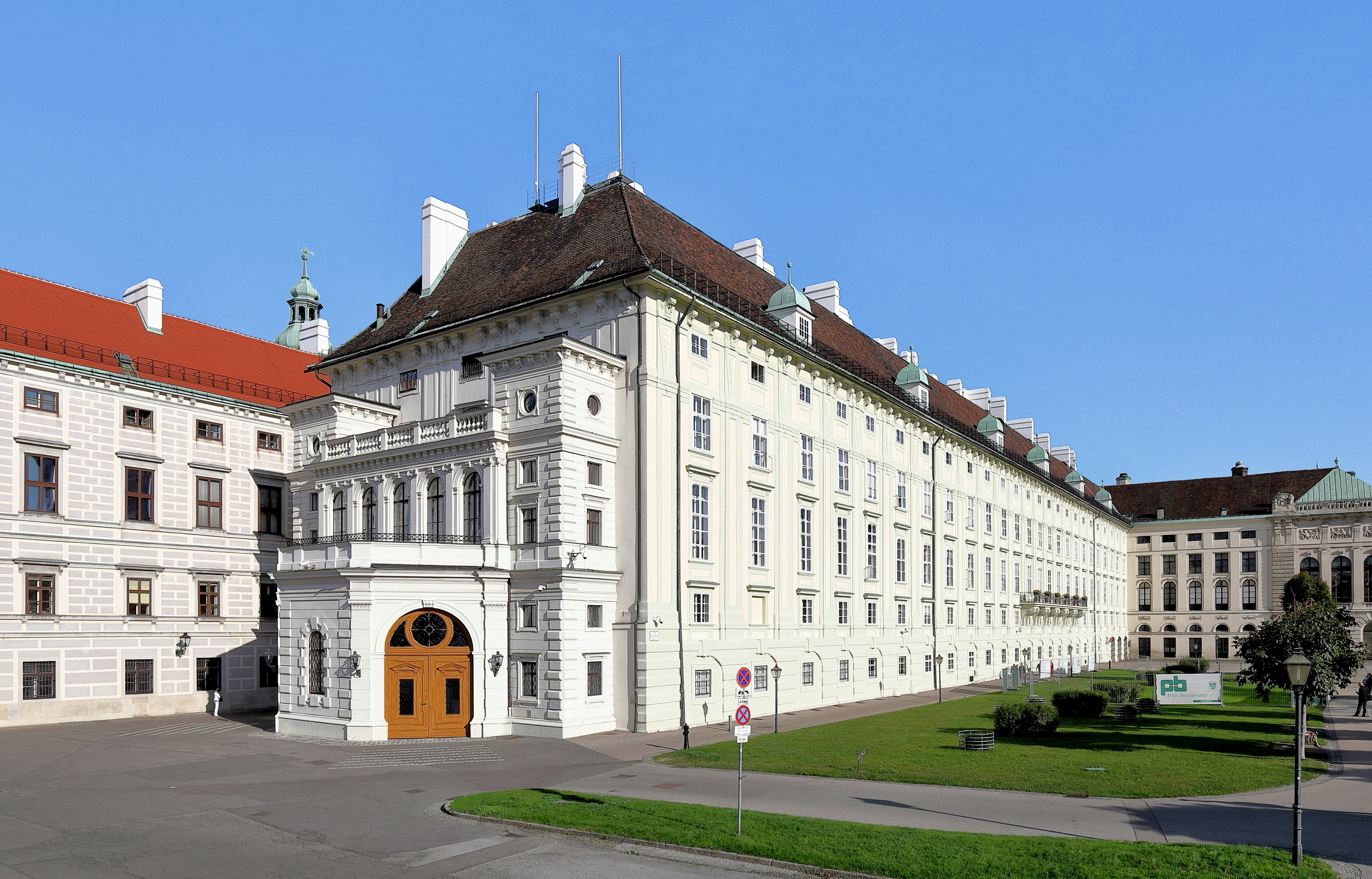
Leopoldine Wing

The connection between the Amalienburg and the Swiss Court is the Leopoldine Wing (Leopoldinischer Flügel) which was first built in the 1660s under Emperor Leopold I and thus named after him. The architect was Filiberto Lucchese, but after the Siege of 1683 by the Turks, the wing was rebuilt by Giovanni Pietro Tencala with an additional floor installed. Through its architecture, this wing still bears a connection to the Late Renaissance. It is in this wing that the offices of the Federal President are located.

The Privy Council Room (Geheime Ratstube) is part of the wing. This is where Emperor Franz Joseph I held his opening speeches at the sessions of the Austro-Hungarian Delegation. Here the Archduke Franz Ferdinand, a nephew of Emperor Franz Joseph I and heir to the throne, spoke the Oath of Renunciation on 28 June 1900 and in so doing renounced all claims to the throne for his descendants, a dynastically necessary act as his intended marriage was to be morganatic, on account of his and his future wife's unequal ranks.

The lower section of this wing as well as that of the Amalienburg served as the enormous wine cellar for the Hofburg.

=== Imperial Chancellery Wing ===
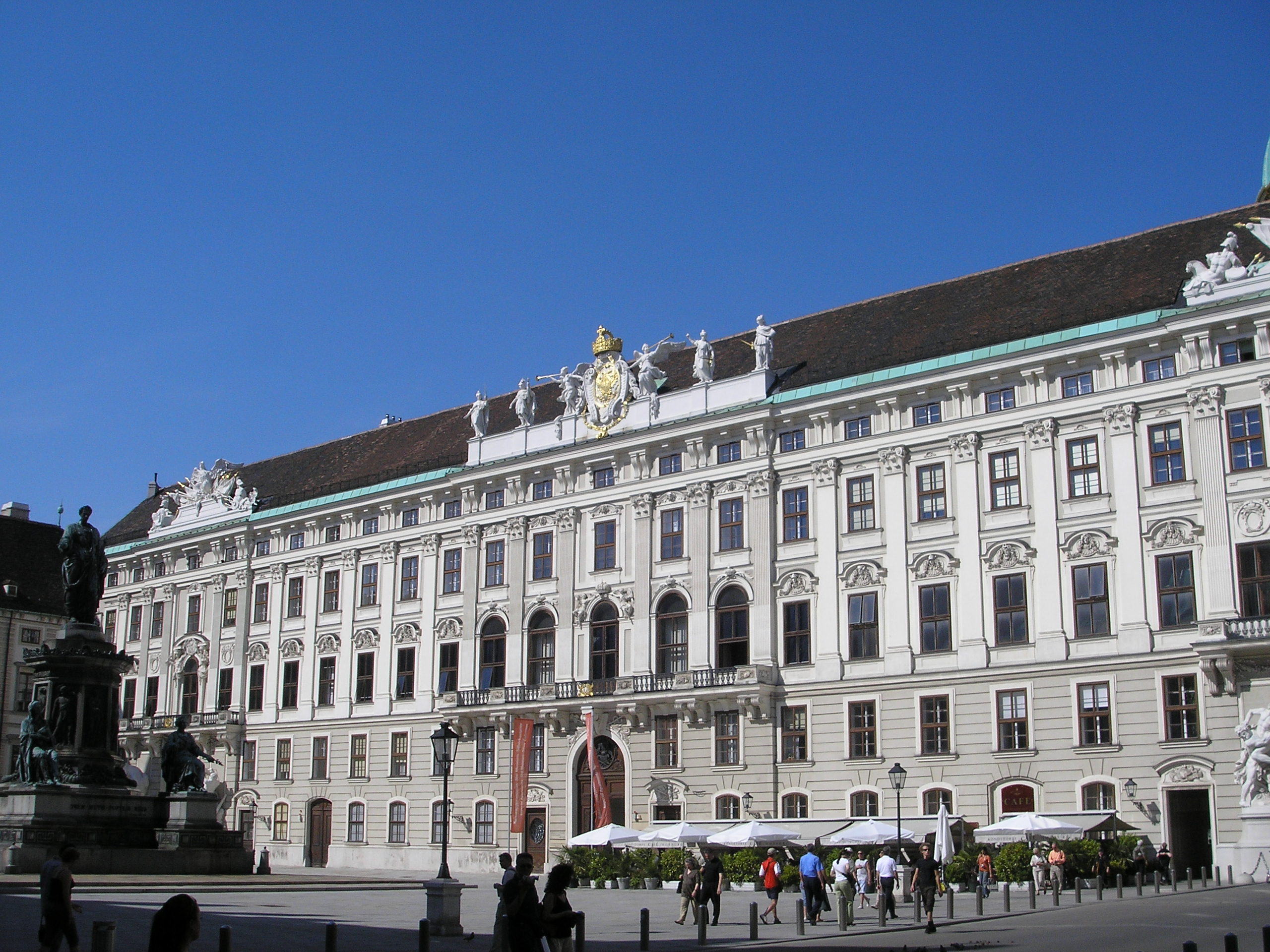
Imperial Chancellery Wing (Reichskanzleitrakt)

An additional father-son collaborative project resulted in the Winter Riding School (Winterreitschule) across from the Stallburg (and where the first Austrian parliament sat in 1848) and in the Imperial Chancellery Wing (Reichskanzleitrakt) across from the Leopoldine Wing. The latter was originally planned by Johann Lukas von Hildebrandt and accommodated, in addition to the Aulic Council (Reichshofrat), the offices of the Imperial Vice-Chancellor (Reichsvizekanzler), who was the de facto prime minister of the Holy Roman Empire since the ceremonial position of Imperial Arch-Chancellor (Reichserzkanzler)—whom the Imperial Vice Chancellor represented—had always been filled by the Archbishop of Mainz since the Middle Ages. After the end of the Holy Roman Empire, this wing housed the apartments of Napoleon, the Duke of Reichstadt, and later those of Emperor Francis Joseph I.

The chancellery, Swiss court, Amalienburg and Leopoldine Wing form the Inner Castle Court (innerer Burghof). In the middle is a bronze statue of Francis I dressed as a Roman emperor, by Pompeo Marchesi.

=== Court Library ===
Originally a free-standing structure, the Court Library (Hofbibliothek) was housed on the other side of the complex. Charles VI had the main building and the Prunksaal main hall constructed. Today it is under the auspices of the Austrian National Library. Its construction was begun by Johann Bernhard Fischer von Erlach and finished by his son Joseph Emanuel in 1735. The large Prunksaal hall contains the book collection of Prince Eugene of Savoy, an enormous ceiling fresco by Daniel Gran, and statues of emperors by Paul Strudel making this part of the Hofburg its most significant in artistic terms. The exterior decoration with attic style figures was executed by Lorenzo Mattielli in 1726. He placed a statue of Athena riding on a quadriga above the main entrance. On the left portion of the roof, he situated Atlas, supporting the celestial globe, flanked by Astronomy and Astrology, and on the opposite side, Gaia with the terrestrial globe, flanked by allegories of Geometry and Geography.

The library to the north is located at Joseph Square.

More structures and annexes were successively added. Particularly from 1763 to 1769, Nicolo Pacassi connected the Imperial Library to the other parts of the Hofburg and its other side to the Augustinian Church and he thus created the present Joseph Square (Josephsplatz), marked by its almost symmetrical proportions.

=== Joseph Square ===
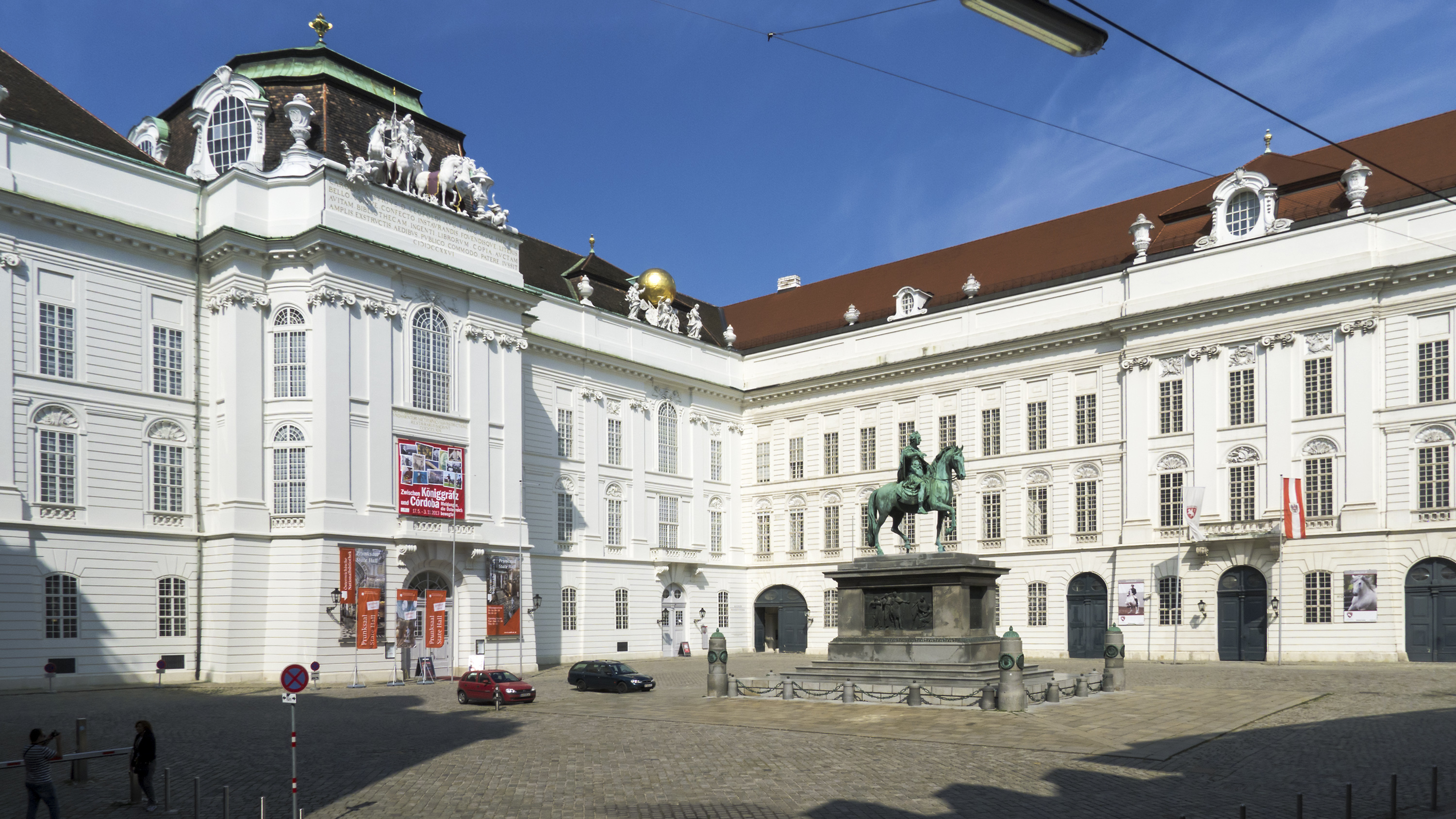
Statue of Emperor Joseph II on Joseph Square, left the Court Library, right the Redoute Wing

Of note are the bronze equestrian statue of Emperor Joseph II.

=== Augustinian Wing ===
Built right before the adjacent Court Library, on the south-east side of Joseph Square, lies the baroque Augustinian Wing with the Augustinian church and monastery. As the palace expanded, the church and monastery became an integral part of the building.

The Augustinian Church was used by the Habsburgs as their court church and also for weddings. This is where Emperor Franz Joseph I and Empress Elisabeth, alias Sisi, were married.

Behind the Loreto side chapel is located the Hearts' Crypt, a semicircular-shaped annexe separated by an iron door, where 54 hearts of House of Habsburg members are kept in silver urns.

The Palais Archduke Albrecht (formerly Palais Tarouca-de Sylva), home of the Albertina museum, is also considered a part of the Hofburg because of its structural connections to the Augustinian monastery. In the early 19th century members of the imperial family had their residence here, such as Archduke Albrecht and, later, his nephew, Archduke Friedrich, Duke of Teschen. After the renovation of the Palais in the 1820s by Joseph Kornhäusel, that section became connected to the Hofburg as well.

=== Redoute Wing ===
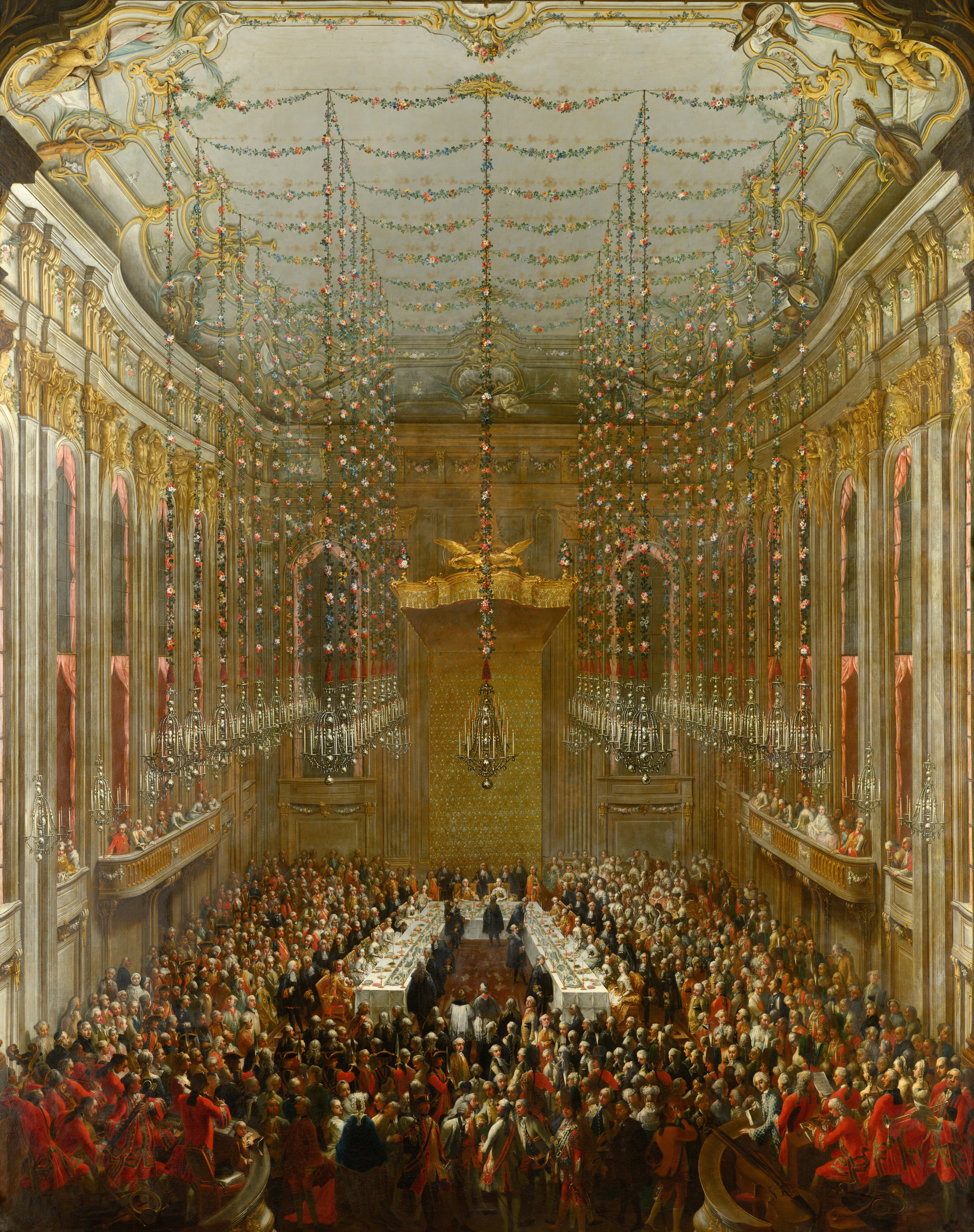
Wedding Supper at Redoutensaal by Martin van Meytens – the wedding of Princess Isabella of Parma and Joseph II, Holy Roman Emperor

On December 30, 1636, the world premiere of Ballo in onore dell'Imperatore Ferdinando III della casa d'Austria by Claudio Monteverdi took place. On March 26, 1660, the world premiere of the oratorio Il sacrifizio d'Abramo by Leopold I, Holy Roman Emperor took place, followed in 1662 by the world premiere of Mercurio esploratore, in 1666 by Le lagrime di San Pietro by Giovanni Felice Sances and Nettunno e Flora festeggianti by Antonio Cesti, and in 1667 by Galatea by Pietro Andrea Ziani and Le disgrazie d'Amore by Cesti.

On July 12, 1668, the 1,000-seat new Theater an der Cortina im Hofburg (designed by Ludovico Ottavio Burnacini) opened with Cesti's Il pomo d'oro, and in the same year the world premiere of Il Ciro vendicatore di se stesso by Antonio Draghi took place, followed in 1669 by Draghi's Chi più sa manco l'intende, in 1671 by Draghi's L'avidità di Mida, in 1673 by Draghi's Il gior della speranza and La Tessalonica, and in 1675 by Draghi's I pazzi Abderiti. It was dismantled after the Siege of Vienna of 1683 but later rebuilt, it remained an important theatre and the main venue for the company and orchestra until the 1860s–1870s, when the new Court Theatre or Wiener Hofoper (now the Vienna State Opera) was built, but musical theatre activities continued to take place there even later (while the Imperial Court spoken-drama company, founded in 1741, acquired the new Burgtheater as its venue in 1888).

Empress Maria Theresia had the 17th-century first opera house converted into the dance and concert halls now known as the Redoutensäle, which consists of a small and a large hall. Together with a number of smaller antechambers they form the Redoute Wing.

The original plans were drawn up by Jean Nicolas Jadot de Ville-Issey, while the external façades are the work of Nicolò Pacassi and Franz Anton Hillebrandt. The Redoutensäle soon became the setting for the cultivated style of baroque entertainment. The name is derived from the French word "redoute", meaning an elegant masked ball, and such balls were also held there. The audience was treated to music by Joseph Haydn and Niccolò Paganini and Franz Liszt. The premiere of Beethoven's 8th Symphony took place there in 1814. The well known saying "The Congress dances" derives from the balls held in the Redoutensaele in the framework of the Congress of Vienna in 1814/15. Johann Strauss served as musical director to the court for the balls held here. Over the centuries, various modification has been made the balls in line with changing tastes.

On 27 November 1992 the whole wing with the Redoutensäle was seriously damaged by fire. The reconstruction and restoration work lasted five years. While the smaller Kleiner Redoutensaal was faithfully restored, for the interior of the larger Grosser Redoutensaal a design competition was held, which was won by the Austrian artist Josef Mikl. He created a number of oil paintings based on literary quotations taken from Ferdinand Raimund, Johann Nepomuk Nestroy and Elias Canetti. His 404 m^{2} ceiling painting incorporates 34 handwritten verses of Karl Kraus' poem "Youth", albeit in a form not visible to the viewer.

The Redoutensäle reopened in 1998 in the framework of the first Austrian Presidency of the Council of the European Union and became since then part of the Hofburg Congress Centre.

Restoration of the roof of the wing gave an opportunity to convert the original loft space into a new amenity called the Rooftop Foyer (Dachfoyer). The architect Manfred Wehdorn designed a modern interior, completed with a spherical structure for secure conferences and panoramic windows. Besides the roof, he also converted the former courtyard between the Hall of Festivals and the southwest wing of the Swiss courtyard to another space.

By 2017 the wing was renovated to house the National Council and the Federal Council while the Austrian Parliament Building is under renovation.

=== Stallburg ===
Although not physically connected to the rest of the complex, the imperial mews (Stallburg) of the Hofburg were originally built as a residence for the then crown prince, Maximilian. It is said that Ferdinand I did not wish to house his son under his roof, as Maximilian had veered towards Protestantism. This structure later accommodated the art collection of Archduke Leopold Wilhelm, the art-inclined brother of Emperor Ferdinand III, and the collection forms the core of the later Kunsthistorisches Museum from 1889. The residence was converted during the Baroque era to house the imperial horses on the ground floor and is used by the Spanish Riding School (Spanische Hofreitschule).

=== St. Michael's Wing ===
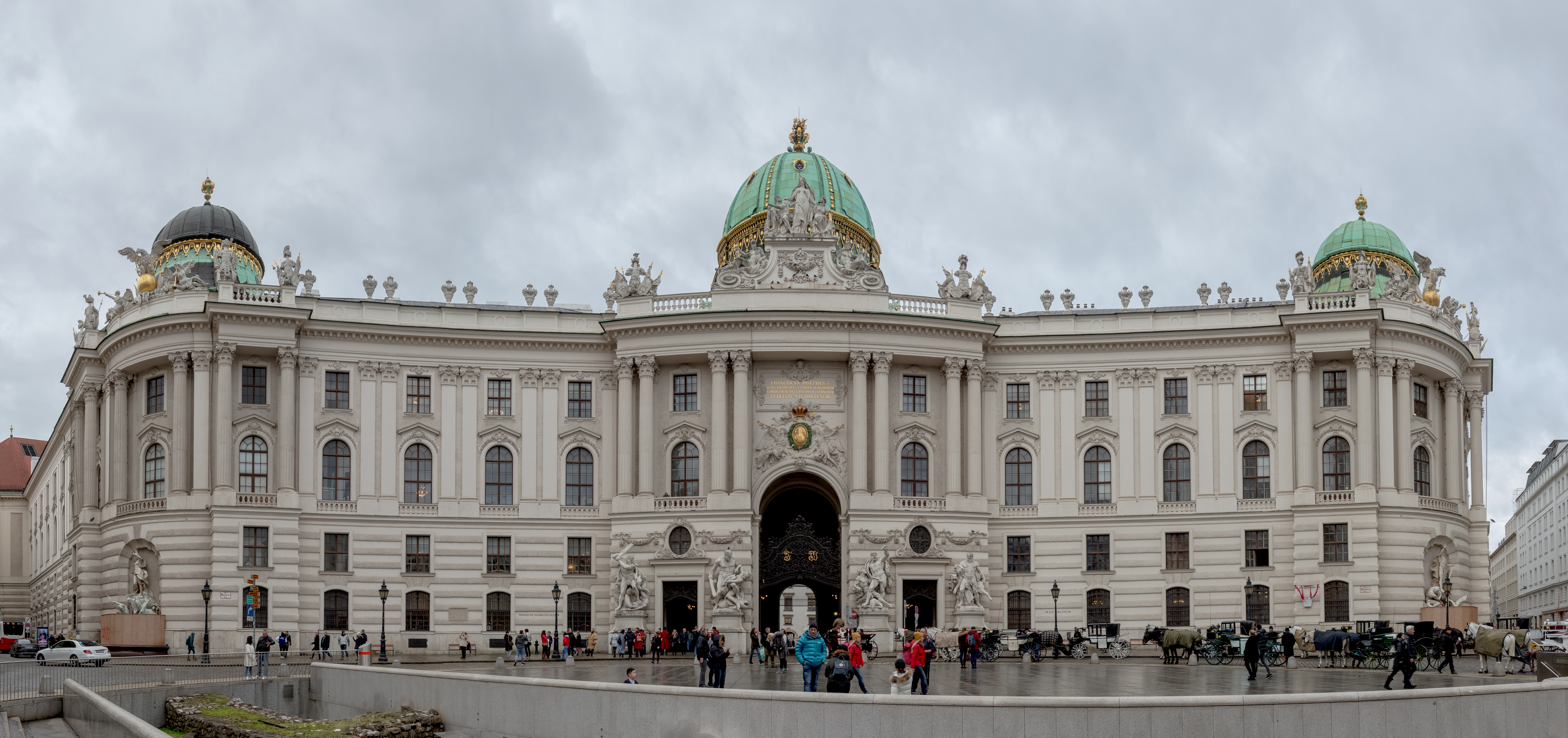
St. Michael's Wing facing the square

St. Michael's Wing was also planned by Joseph Emanuel Fischer von Erlach, and it serves as the connection between the Winter Riding School and the Imperial Chancellery Wing. However, because the old Imperial Court Theatre (Burgtheater) stood in the way, these plans remained unrealized until Ferdinand Kirschner built the wing from 1889 to 1893, utilizing a slightly altered plan.

After the completion of St. Michael's Square, two sculpted fountains were installed on the façade of the wing: Power at Sea by Rudolf Weyr and Power on Land by Edmund Hellmer.

The wing is named in reference to St. Michael's Church on the opposite side.

=== Festival Hall Wing ===
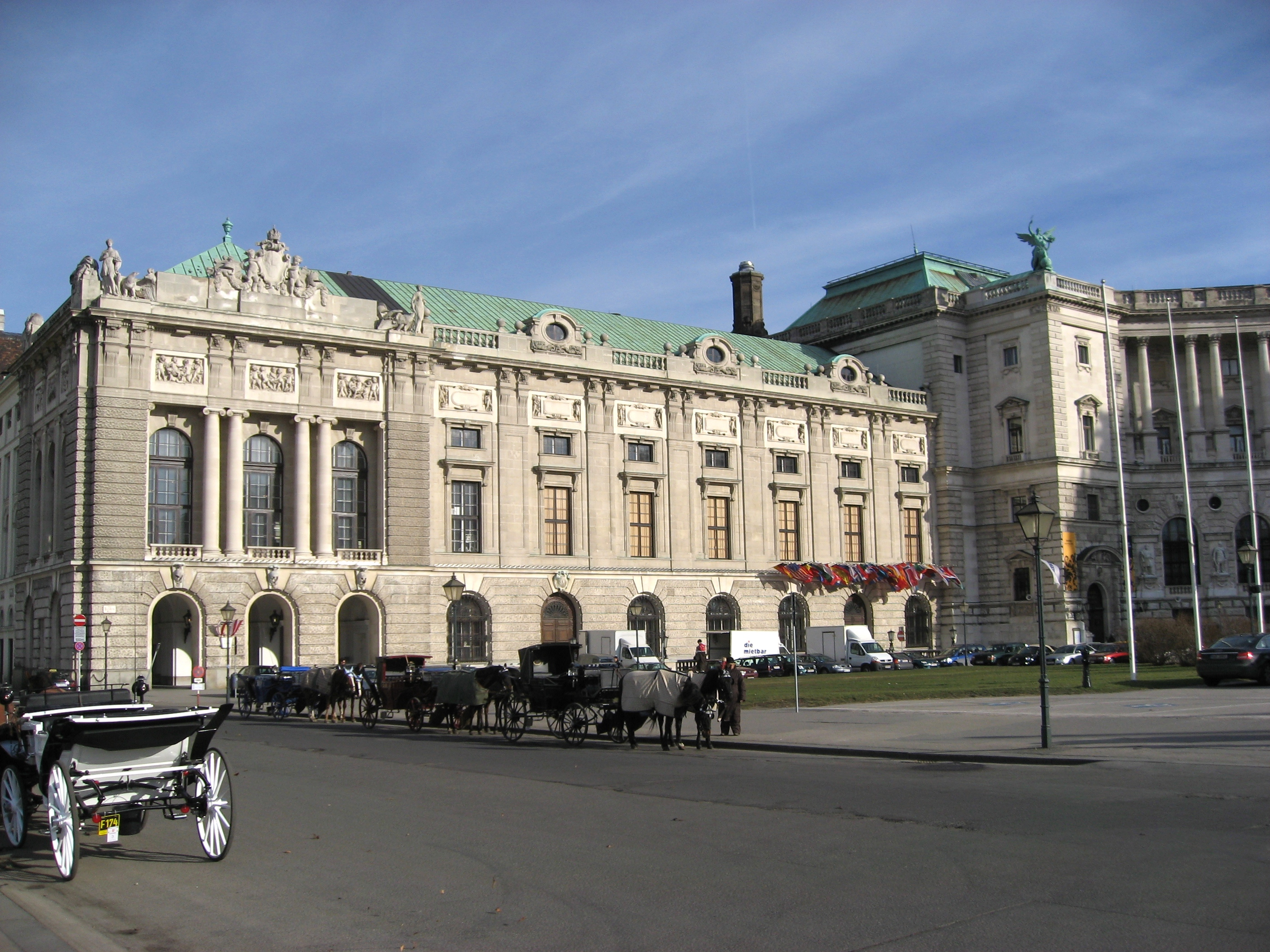
Festsaal (Festival Hall Wing)

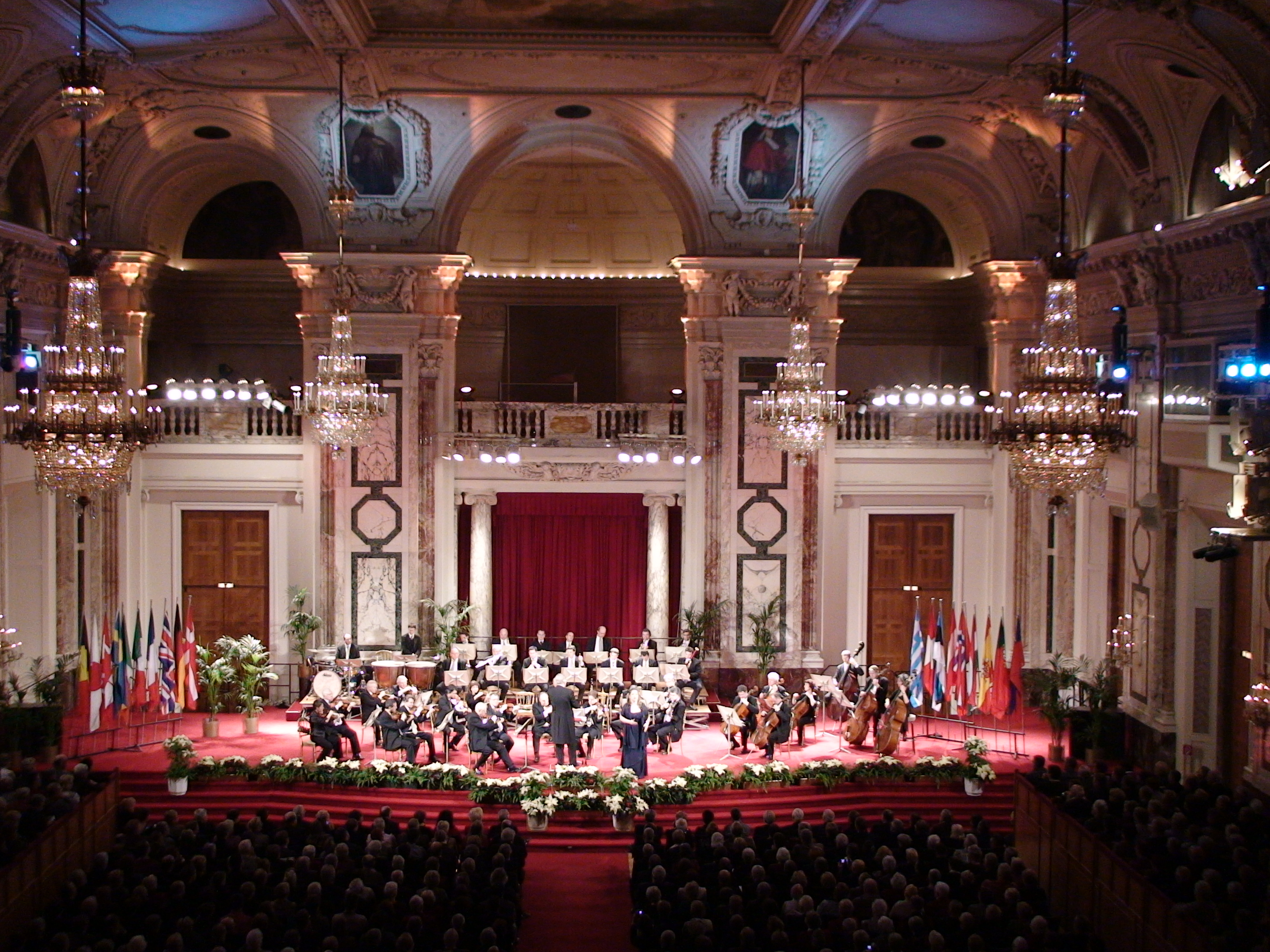
The Hall of Festivities during a concert of the Vienna Hofburg Orchestra

The walls of the Marble Hall in front of the Hall of Ceremonies date back to the 16th century and theoretically belong to the Leopoldine Wing, but the scagliola for the interior was changed around 1840 to match the appearance of the newer Hall of Ceremonies. During the imperial period it was used as a dining room and for balls for the children at court.

The Hall of Ceremonies was built for Emperor Francis II/I by the Belgian architect Louis Montoyer at the beginning of the 19th century. Because of its additional nature, it formed a clearly visible protrusion at right angles to the Leopoldine Wing for almost a hundred years, and was therefore also called the "Nose".

With its ornate coffered ceiling and 26 crystal chandeliers, which once held 1,300 candles, the Hall of Ceremonies was grand. The 24 Corinthian columns are done in scagliola technique, in which painted gypsum resembles marble. In this hall Napoleon I asked for the hand of Archduchess Marie Louise, the daughter of Emperor Francis II/I. This was also where court balls were held and later also speeches from the throne. and where the exclusive Ball at the Court was held. On Maundy Thursday, the emperor and empress invited twelve poor old men and women to have their feet washed in a traditional Maundy ceremony.

Later on the Hall of Ceremonies became fully integrated into the New Castle (Neue Burg) by 1916.

With its 1,000m^{2} of floor space, the Hall of Festivals (Festsaal) is the biggest hall in the whole of the Hofburg. Although built as a throne room, it was never used as such. The internal works were finished in 1923, but the artwork remained incomplete. The hall has Alois Hans Schramm's three ceiling paintings, dedicated to the greater glory of the Habsburgs, complete with Emperor Franz Joseph's motto "Viribus Unitis" (with united strength). The lower lunettes and octagonal panels are decorated with paintings by Eduard Veith and Viktor Stauffer of famous people from Austrian history, with Maximilian I, Charles V, Ferdinand I, Rudolph II and Ferdinand II of Tyrol to be seen in the ceiling paintings, and Leopold I, Charles VI, Prince Eugene and also the Polish King John III Sobieski in the side panels. The hall was also the venue for 1967 Eurovision Song Contest.

=== Heroes Square ===
In 1809, a part of the old bastion adjacent to the palace was demolished in the course of the Napoleonic Wars. All the way up to the present Ring Road, new grounds were laid out, in which the neoclassical main castle gate (Burgtor) was integrated. Within the new walls which were erected in 1817, three gardens were made: the private Imperial Castle Garden (Burggarten), Heroes Square (Heldenplatz) as a large open, green area, and the People's Garden (Volksgarten) with the Temple of Theseus (Theseustempel). Along with the Burgtor, it was designed by Peter von Nobile.

The Hall of Ceremonies and the Neue Burg make up the backdrop of the square.

Equestrian statues of the two most important Austrian field marshals, Prince Eugene of Savoy and Archduke Charles, stand at the foci of Heroes Square. On 15 March 1938 Adolf Hitler proclaimed from the balcony of the New Castle onto Heroes' Square the "Anschluss" of Austria into the Nazi Third Reich.

=== Neue Burg ===
Following the enlargement of Vienna after the demolition of the city walls in the 1860s, the Hofburg had its last great expansion. An Imperial Forum (Kaiserforum) was planned, in which a two-winged structure reaching beyond the Ring Road, with the twin museums (Kunsthistorisches Museum and Naturhistorisches Museum) as flanks and terminating at the old Imperial Mews (the Hofstallungen, not to be confused with the much older Stallburg) of Fischer von Erlach. The project was led by Gottfried Semper and later by Karl Freiherr von Hasenauer. The museums were completed in 1891, but construction of the rest of the forum dragged on slowly and conflicted since because of rising costs and no real function could be found for the enormous construction project. In 1913, the south-west wing, the New Castle (Neue Burg), was completed. However, the Imperial Forum was never completed and remains a torso.

The New Castle wing today houses a number of museums (the Ephesos Museum, the Collection of Arms and Armour, the Collection of Ancient Musical Instruments, and the Museum of Ethnology) as well as some reading rooms of the national library. The Hofburg Congress Centre is also located here.

== Coins ==
The Hofburg featured as the main motif on the 20 euro Renaissance commemorative coin. The coin shows the Swiss Gate of the palace. This gate bears Ferdinand I's coat-of-arms and titles. It is flanked by two soldiers of the period as a reminder of the unsettled times which saw Vienna besieged by Turkish armies in 1529, as well as the struggles between Protestants and Catholics during the Reformation.

== Images ==
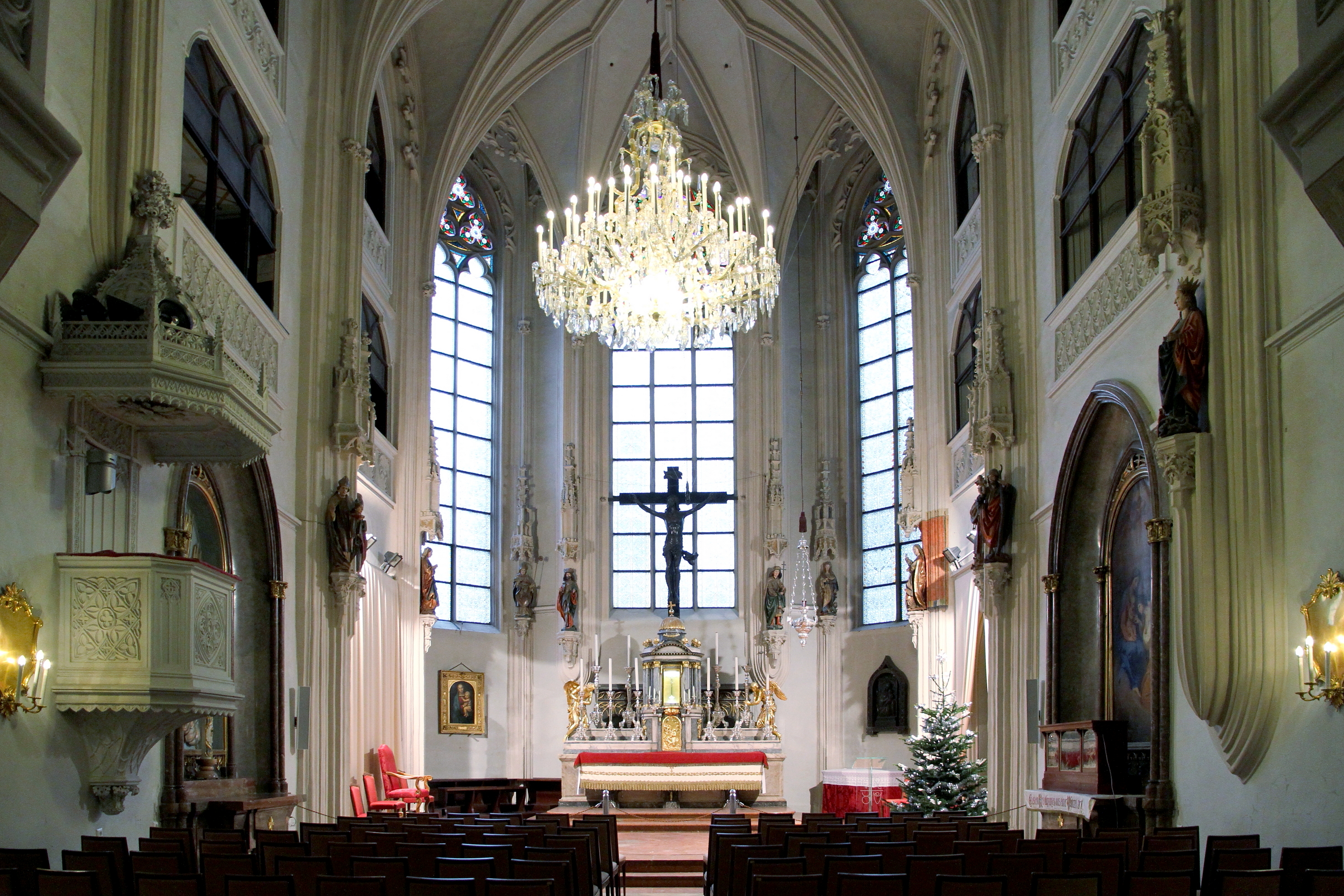
Imperial court chapel

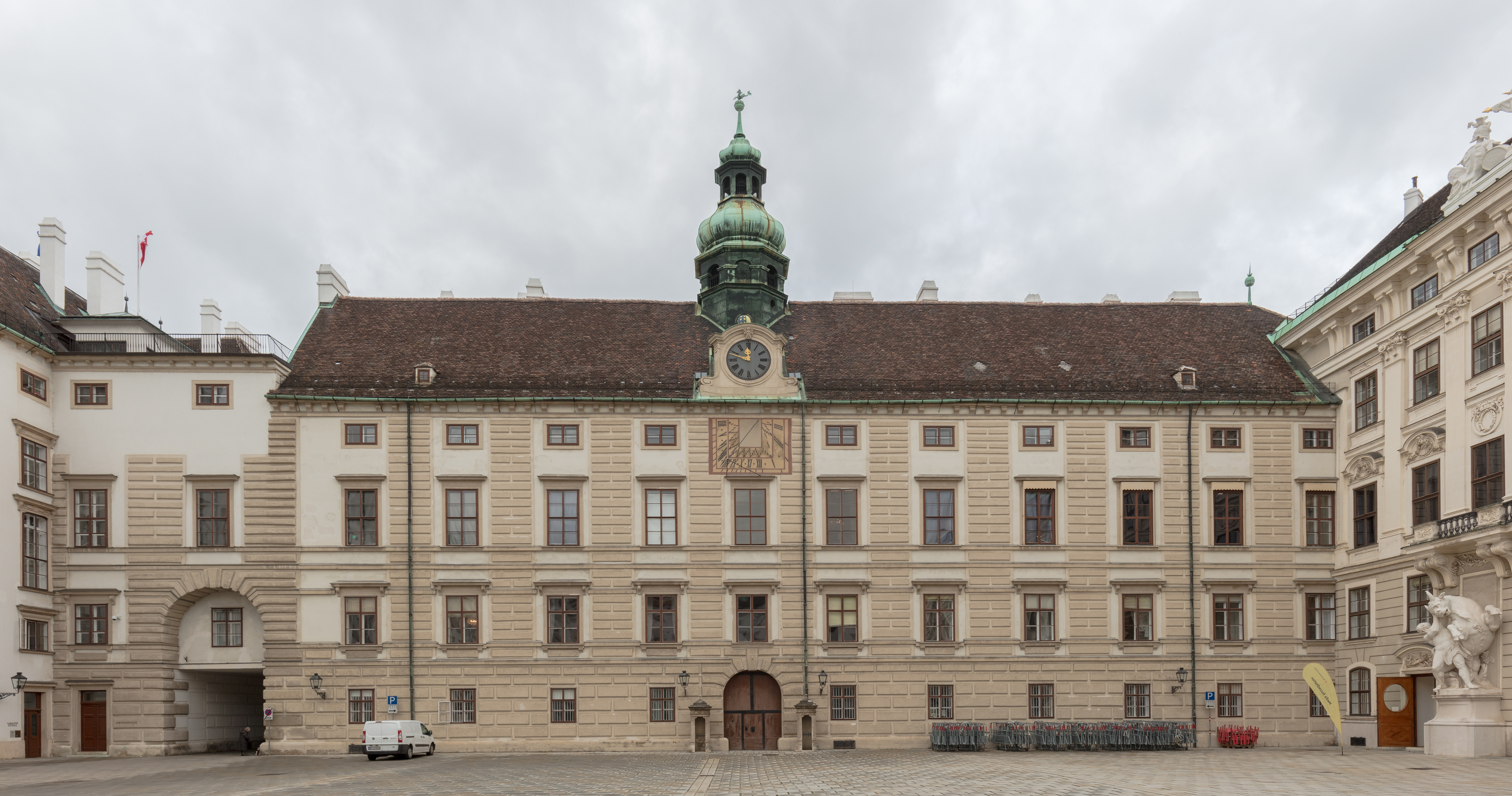
Amalienburg

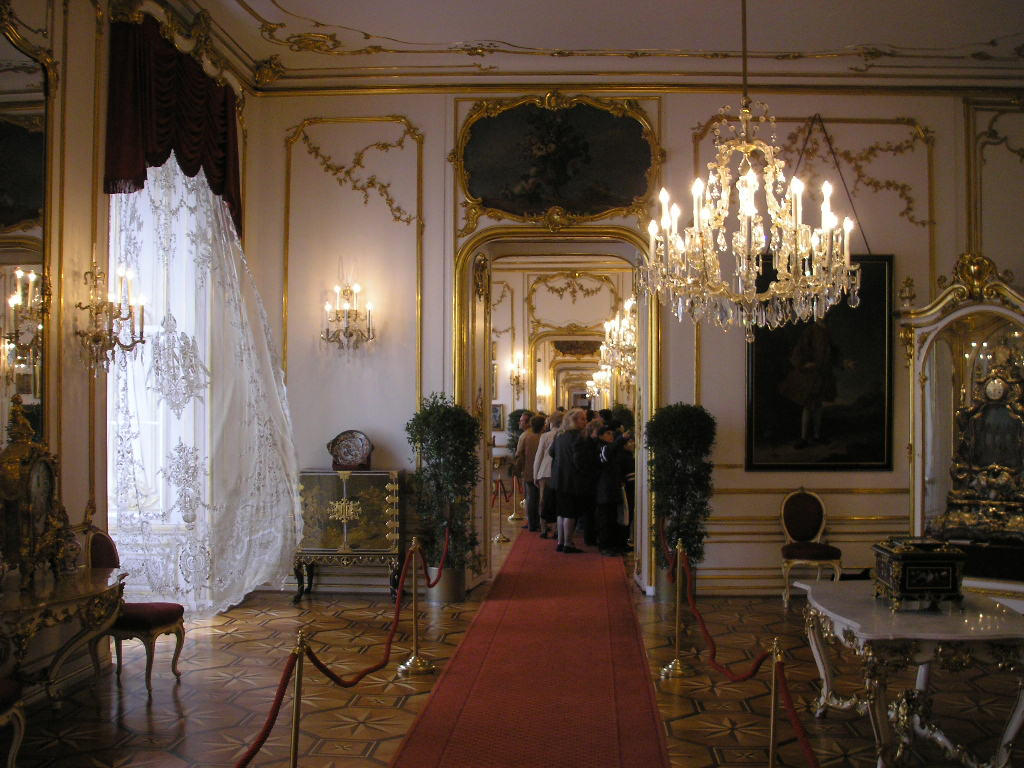
Rose room in the Leopoldine wing

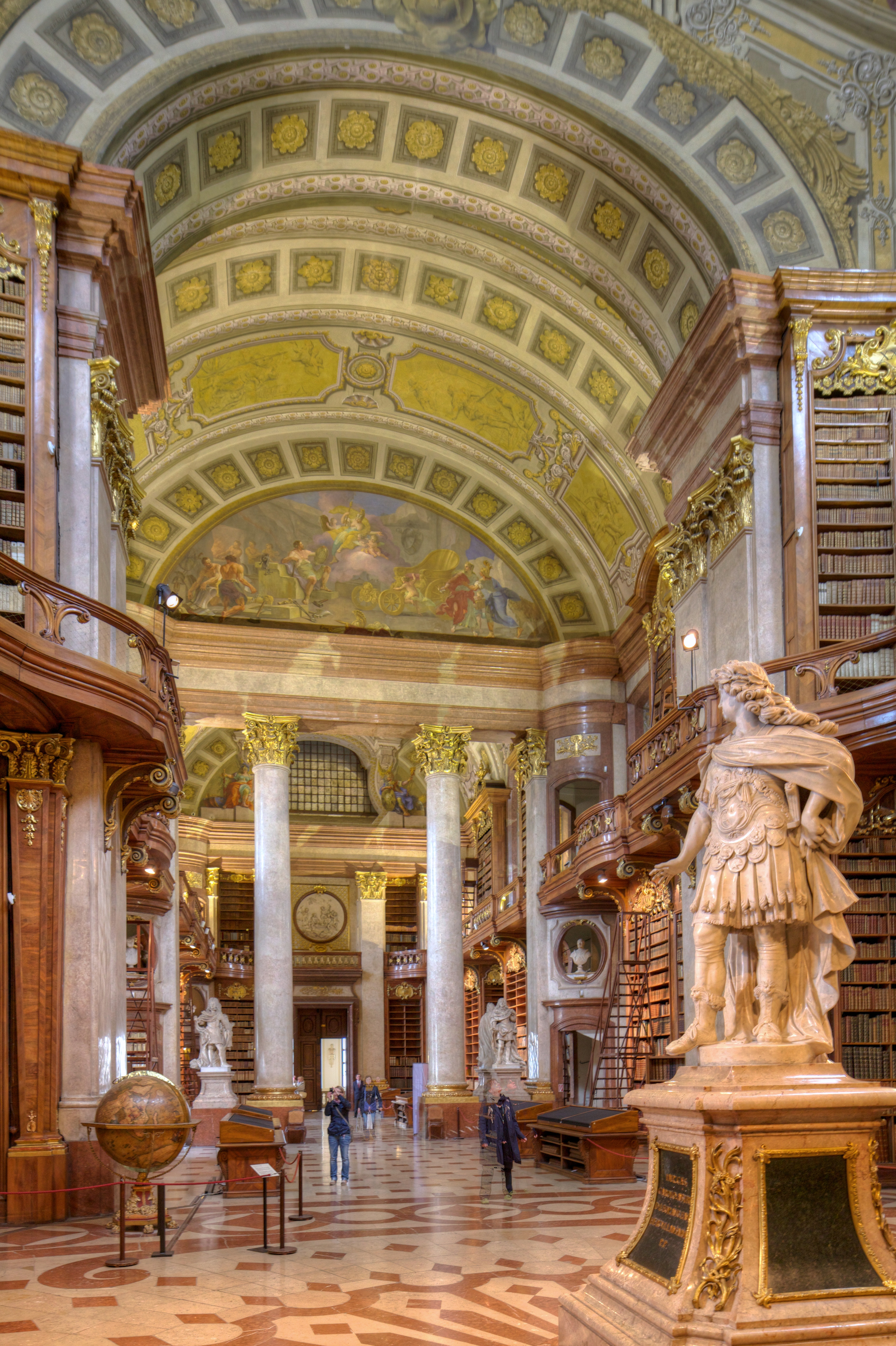
Main hall of the court library

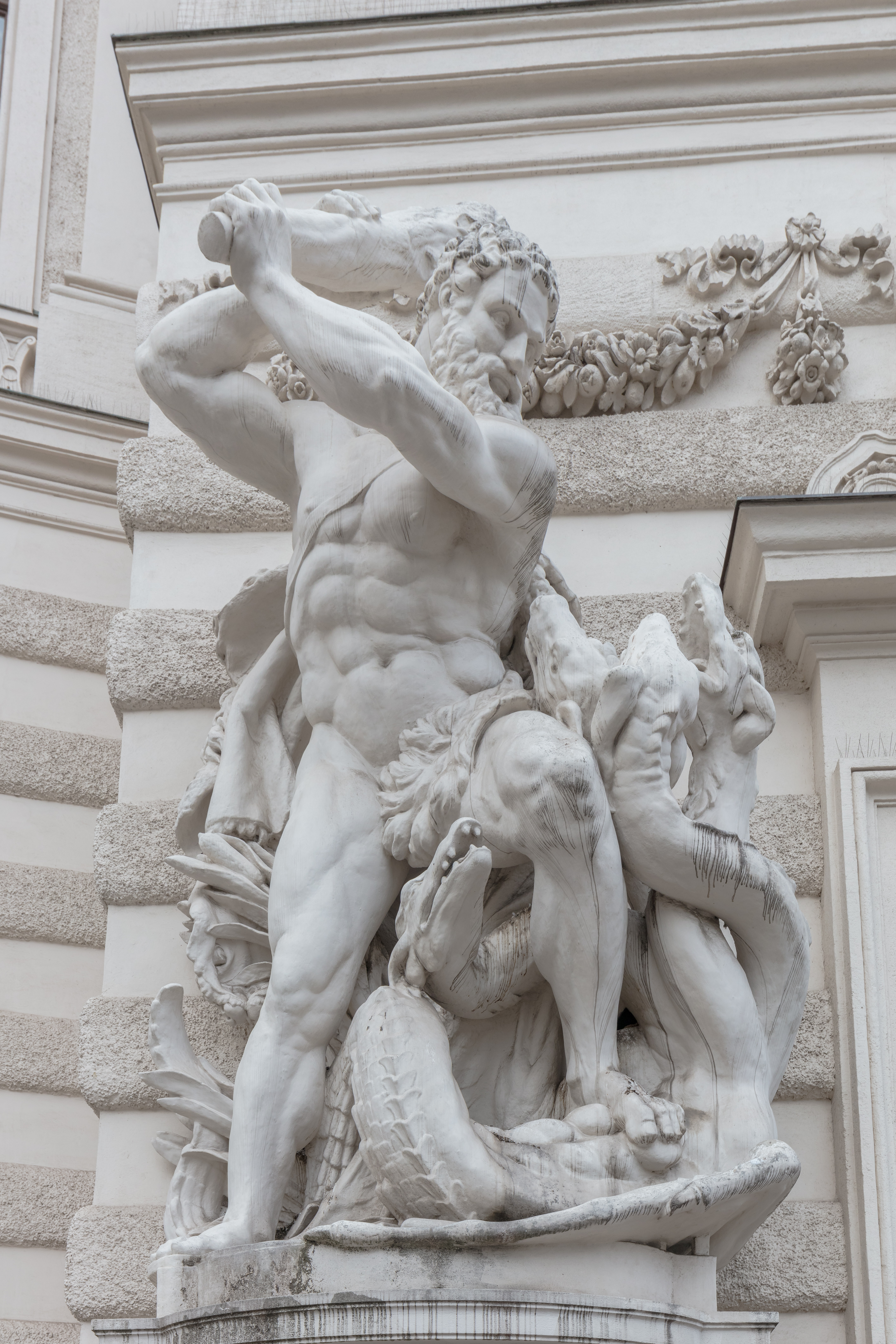
Statue of Hercules slaying the Lernaean Hydra, exterior façade statuary on St. Michael's wing

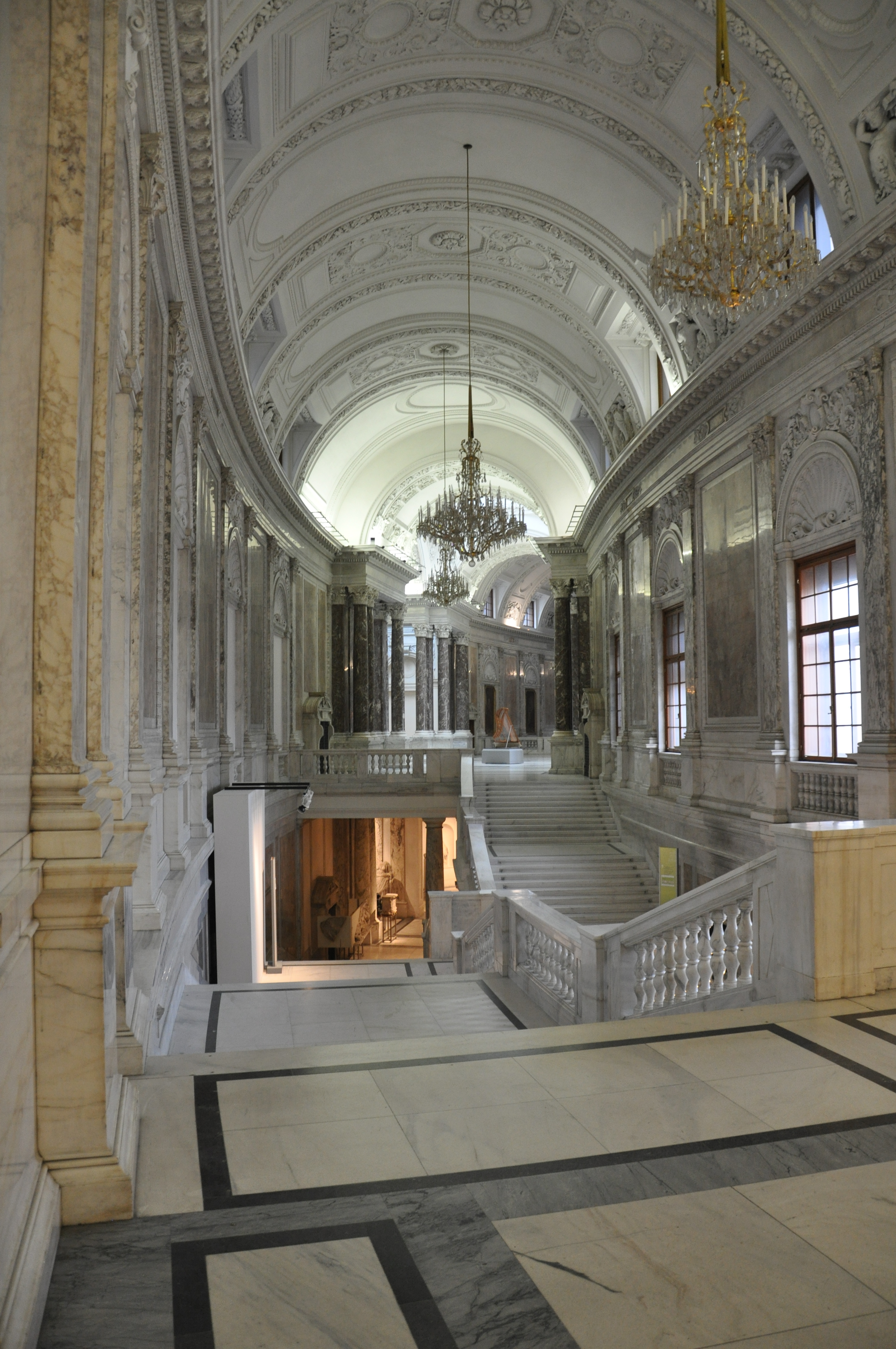
Main staircase of the Neue Burg wing

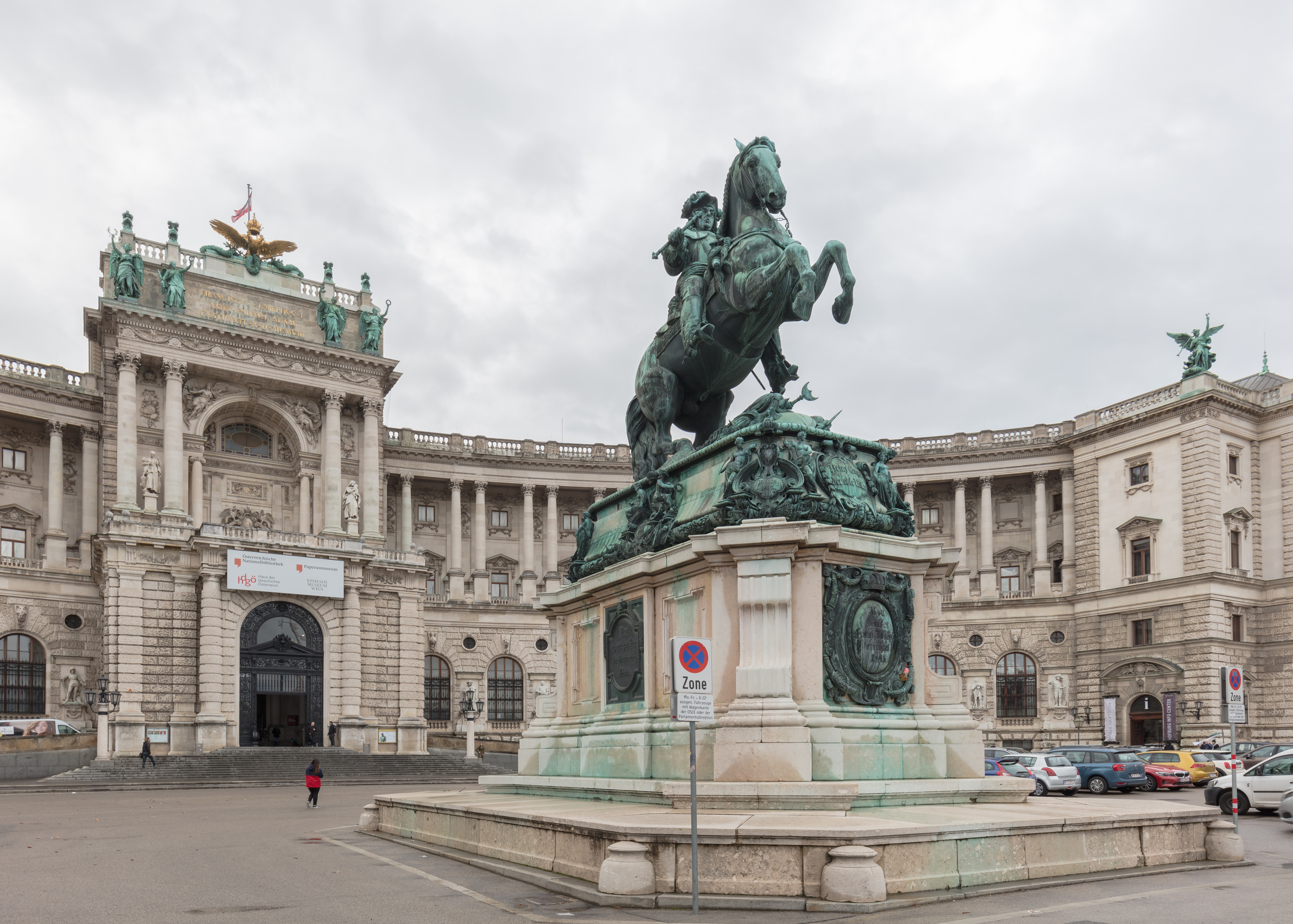
Prince Eugene of Savoy monument directly in front of the Hofburg

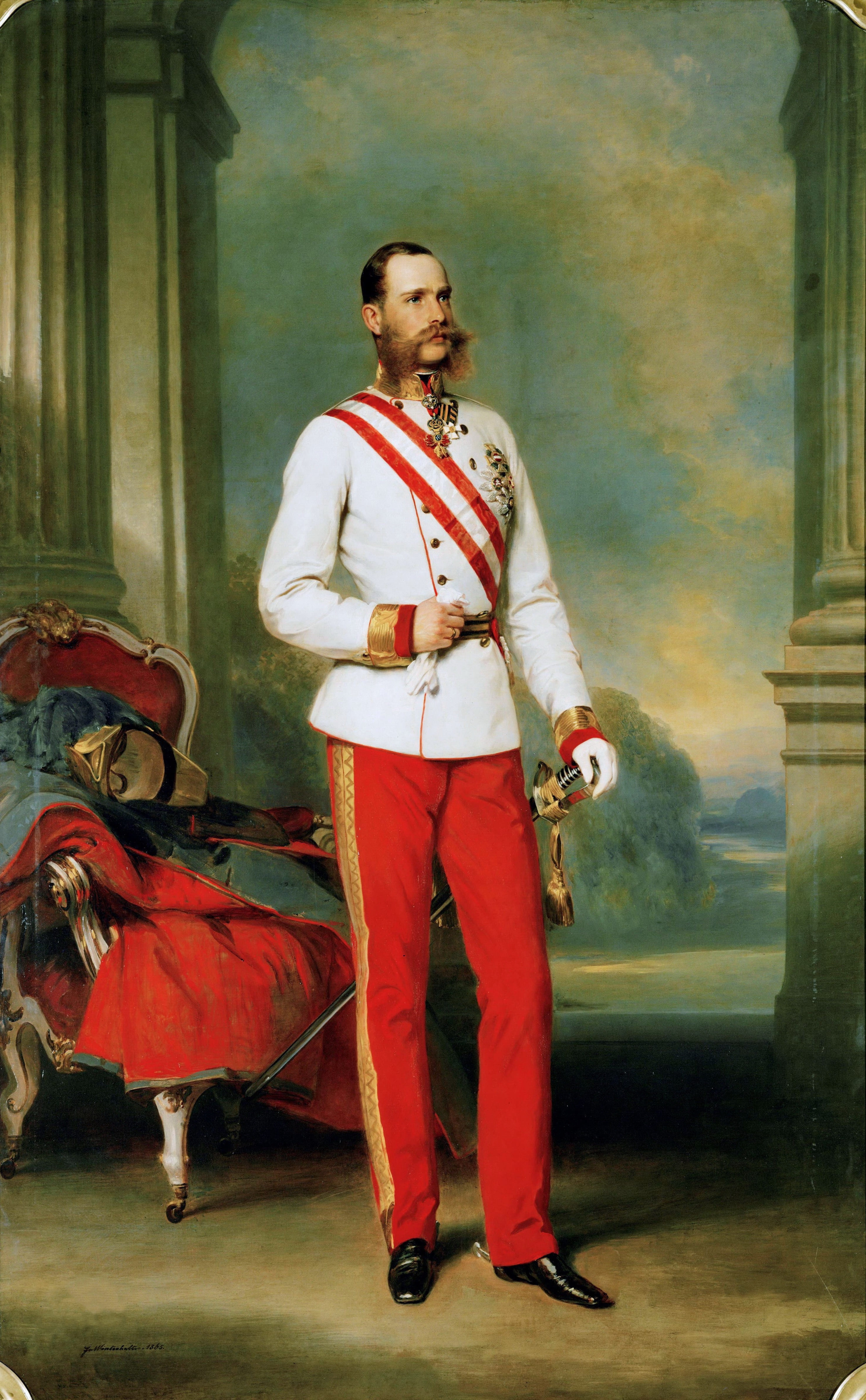
Portrait of Franz Joseph I by Franz Xaver Winterhalter, 1865

== See also ==
- Leopoldine Wing
- Laxenburg castles
- Hofburg, Innsbruck
- Buda Castle
- Prague Castle
- Bratislava Castle

== Notes ==
subclade distance 0

== Literature ==
- Kurdiovsky, Richard, ed. (2008). The office of the Austrian Federal President at the Vienna Hofburg (in German and English). Herbert Karner, Richard Kurdiovsky, Marcus Langer, Hellmut Lorenz, Anna Mader, Florian Steininger und Manuel Weinberger; Photography by Manfred Seidl. Vienna: Christian Brandstätter Verlag. p. 159. ISBN 978-3-85033-161-6.

Preceded by Villa Louvigny; Luxembourg City	Eurovision Song Contest; Venue; 1967	Succeeded by Royal Albert Hall; London
