= Il pomo d'oro =

Opera by Antonio Cesti

- Opera by Antonio Cesti
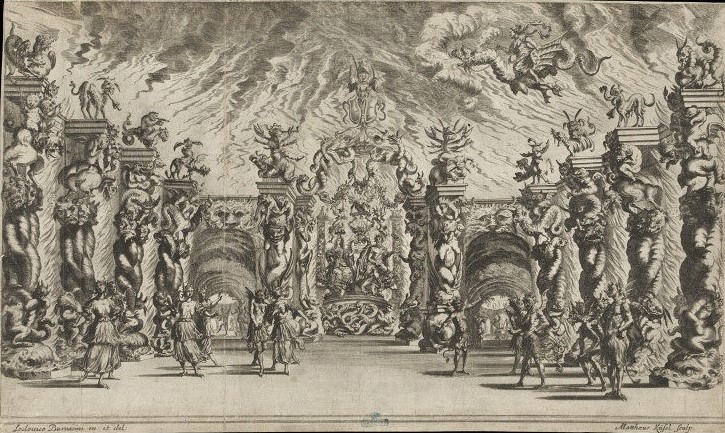
- Burnacini's stage set for the underworld scene
- Librettist: Francesco Sbarra
- Premiere: 1668; Vienna, Austria

Il pomo d'oro (The Golden Apple) is an opera in a prologue and five acts by the Italian composer Antonio Cesti with a libretto by Francesco Sbarra (1611-1668). It was first performed before the imperial court in a specially constructed open-air theatre Vienna in 1668. The work was so long it had to be staged over the course of two days: the Prologue, Acts One and Two were given on July 12; Acts Three, Four and Five on July 14. Originally planned to mark the wedding of the Habsburg Holy Roman Emperor Leopold I and Margaret Theresa of Spain in 1666, the production was rescheduled to mark the Empress's 17th birthday in 1668. The staging was unprecedented for its magnificence (and expense). The designer Ludovico Ottavio Burnacini provided no fewer than 24 sets and there were plenty of opportunities for spectacular stage machinery, including shipwrecks and collapsing towers.

== Roles ==
Role	Voice type
Prologue
Spagna (Spain)	Soprano
Italia (Italy)	Alto Castrato
Regno D'Ungheria (The Kingdom Of Hungary)	Tenor
L'Impero (The Empire - The Holy Roman Empire)	Bass
Sardegna (Sardinia)	Soprano
Regno Di Boemia (The Kingdom Of Bohemia)	Alto Castrato
L'America (America)	Tenor
Stato Patrimoniale (Balance Sheet)	Bass
La Gloria Austriaca (The Austrian Glory)	Soprano
Amore (Cupid)	Soprano
Himeneo (Hymen)	Alto Castrato
Main Plot
Adrasto (Adrastus)	Alto Castrato
Aglaie (Aglaea)	Soprano
Alceste	Alto Castrato (en travesti)
Aletto (Alecto)	Soprano
Apollo	Alto Castrato
Aurindo (Aurindus)	Alto Castrato
Austro (Auster)	Tenor
Bacco (Bacchus)	Bass
Caronte (Charon)	Bass
Cecrope (Cecrops)	Bass
Ennone (Oenone)	Soprano
Eolo (Aeolus)	Bass
Eufrosine (Euphrosyne)	Soprano
Euro (Euros)	Unknown
Filaura	Tenor
Ganimede (Ganymede)	Alto Castrato
Giove (Jupiter)	Bass
Giunone (Juno)	Soprano
Ebe (Hebe)	Soprano
la Discordia (Discord)	Soprano
l’Elemento Del Foco (The Element Of Fire)	Alto Castrato
Marte (Mars)	Tenor
Megera (Megaera)	Alto
Mercurio (Mercury)	Alto Castrato
Momo (Momus)	Bass
Nettuno (Neptune)	Bass
Pallade (Pallas)	Soprano
Paride (Paris)	Tenor
Pasithea	Alto
Plutone (Pluto)	Bass
Proserpina (Proserpine)	Soprano
Tisifone (Tisiphone)	Soprano
Un Sacerdote (A Priest)	Bass
Un Soldato (A Soldier)	Tenor
Venere (Venus)	Soprano
Volturno (Volturnus)	Unknown
Zeffiro (Zephyrus)	Soprano Castrato

== Synopsis ==
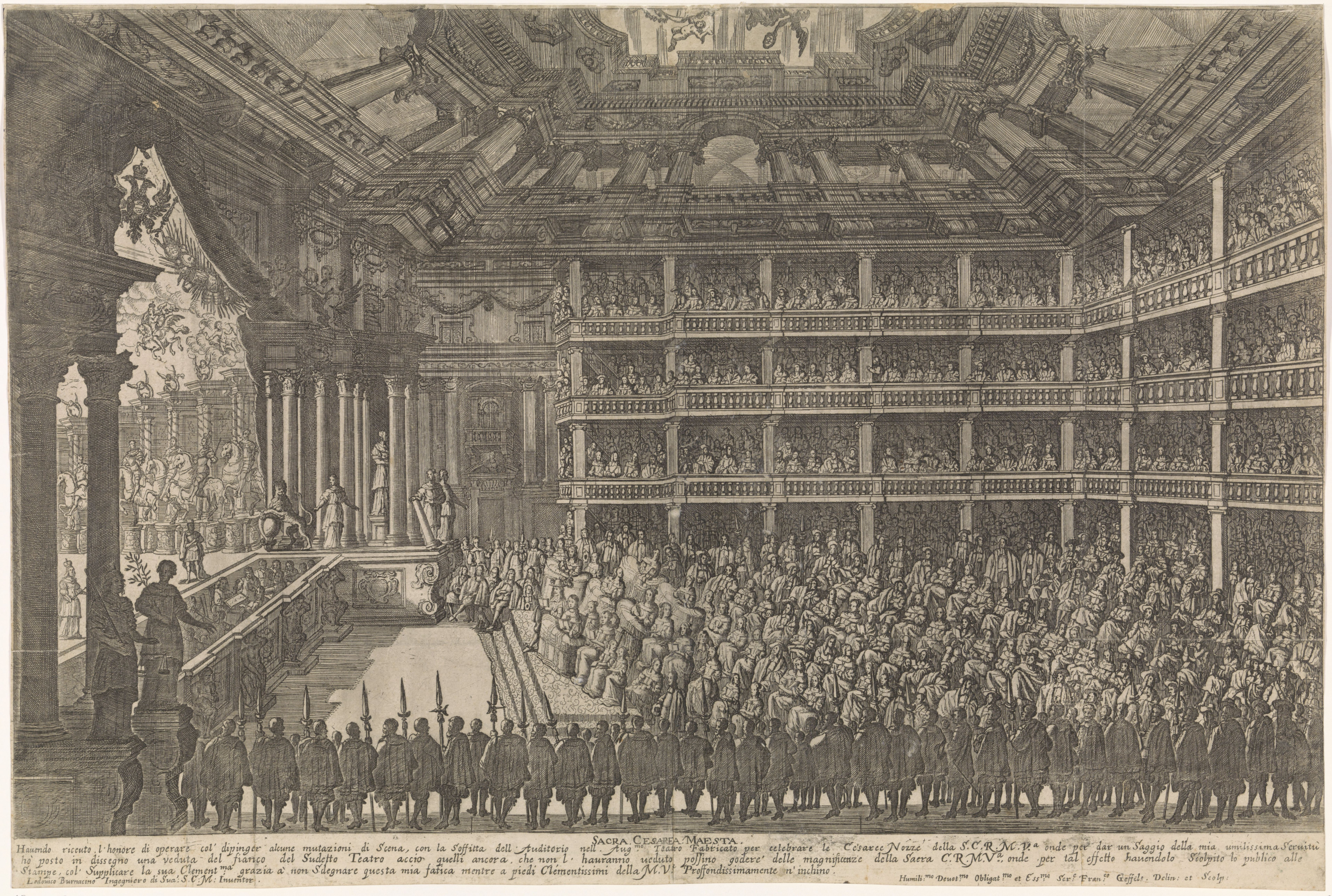
A performance of Il pomo d'oro at the Vienna court theatre in 1668

The opera tells the story of the Judgement of Paris. The gods ask the Trojan prince Paris to decide which of the goddesses Venus, Juno and Pallas (Minerva) is the most beautiful and thus deserving of the Golden Apple of Discord. Paris gives the prize to Venus. The spurned goddesses try to get their revenge until Jupiter decides to end the confusion, turns to the audience and awards the golden apple to the Empress Margaret Theresa.

== Sources ==
- The Viking Opera Guide ed. Holden (Viking, 1993)
- Del Teatro (in Italian)
- Le magazine de l'opéra baroque
- The Oxford Illustrated History of Opera ed. Parker (OUP, 1994)
