= Perron (staircase) =

Outdoor stairway

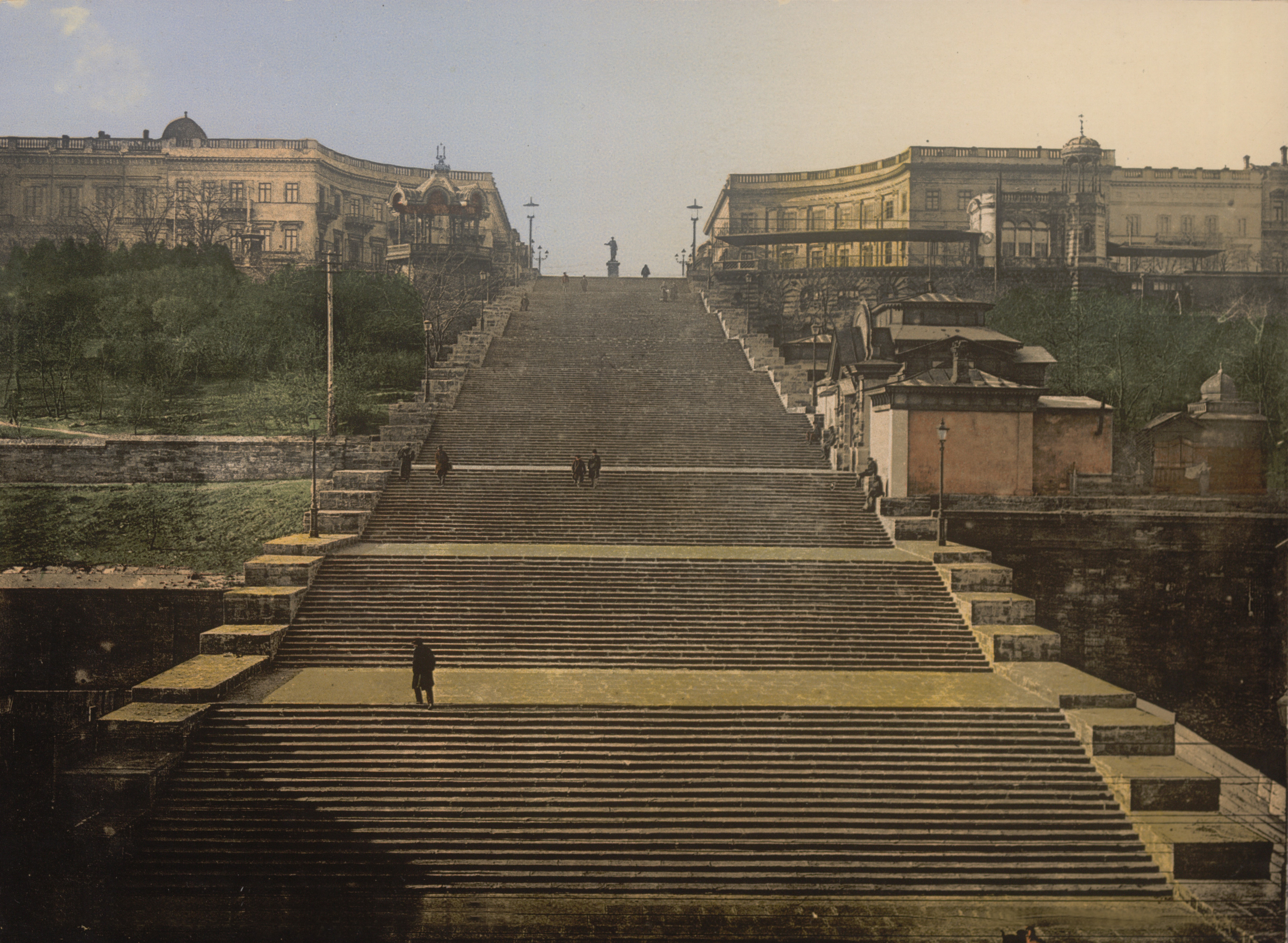
The Potemkin Stairs in Odesa, Ukraine

In architecture, a perron generally refers to an external stairway to a building. James Stevens Curl notes three more-specific usages: the platform-landing reached by symmetrical flights of steps leading to the piano nobile of a building; the steps themselves; or the platform base of edifices like a market cross. Perron also refers to a type of Belgian civic monument, which usually sits on a perron.

A perron may be placed in front of the main entrance of a building or house, either as a single stone staircase or pair of such staircases leading up to the entrance and built in the Romanesque or Palladian styles and decorated with arches, balustrades and corbels.

One of the largest and most impressive Baroque perrons is found outside Girona Cathedral and consists of 90 steps on three flights of stairs. The Calà del Sasso in Upper Italy has 4,444 steps and is one of the largest outside staircases in Europe. Also well known are the Spanish Steps in Rome, that lead from the Piazza di Spagna to the church of Santa Trinità dei Monti. At the theatre of Freilichtspiele Schwäbisch Hall, the perron in front of the town church is the main stage for theatre productions. The Strudlhofstiege in Vienna, an Art Nouveau style perron, is well known because it forms the title of the 1951 novel The Strudlhof Steps by Heimito von Doderer.

The Weinbergtreppe or Weinbergstaffel is the name given to the outside steps used in vineyards. They are very steep and are often placed between high vineyard walls. They are normally made of natural stone ashlars.

== Gallery ==
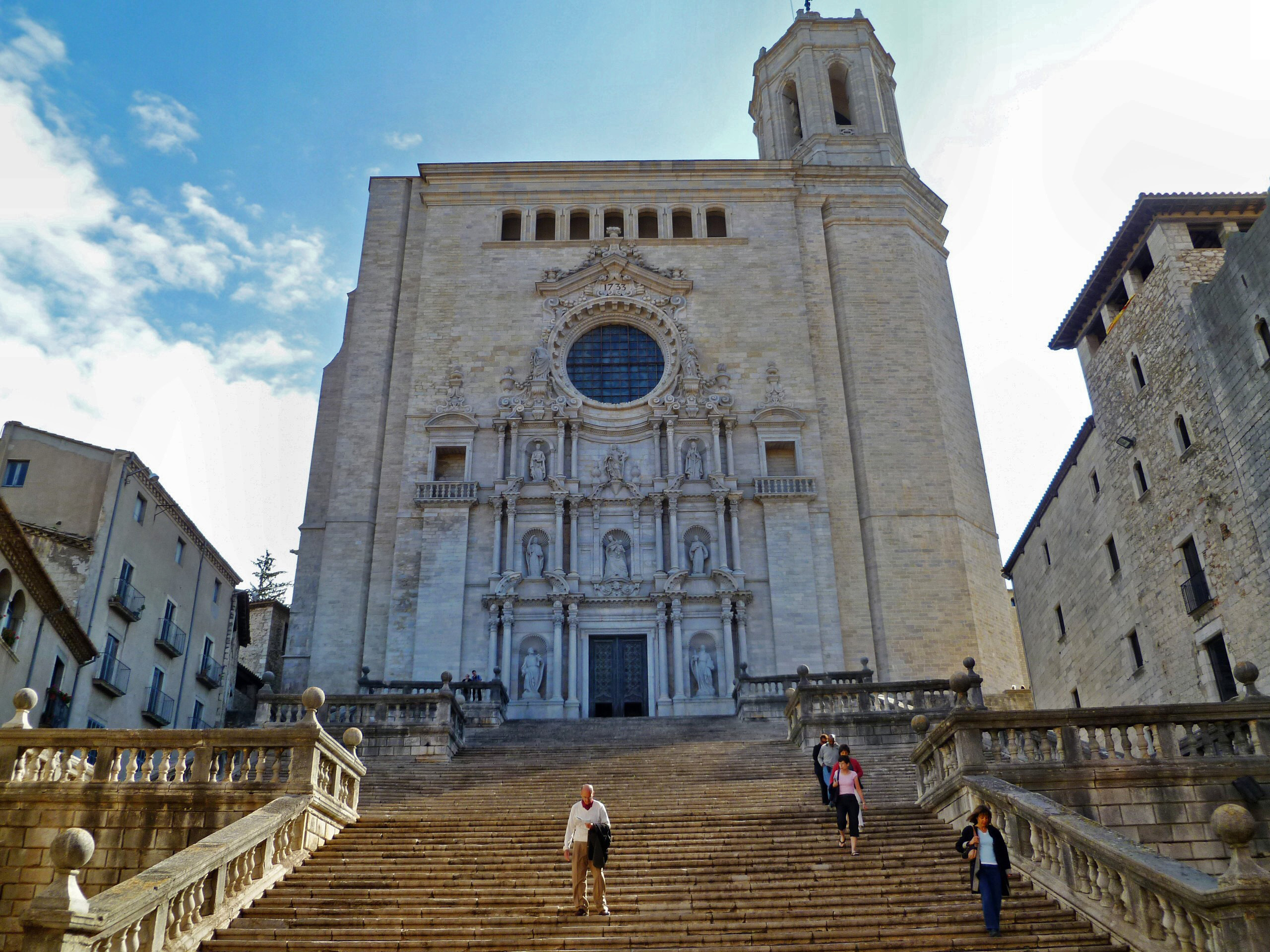
Girona Cathedral

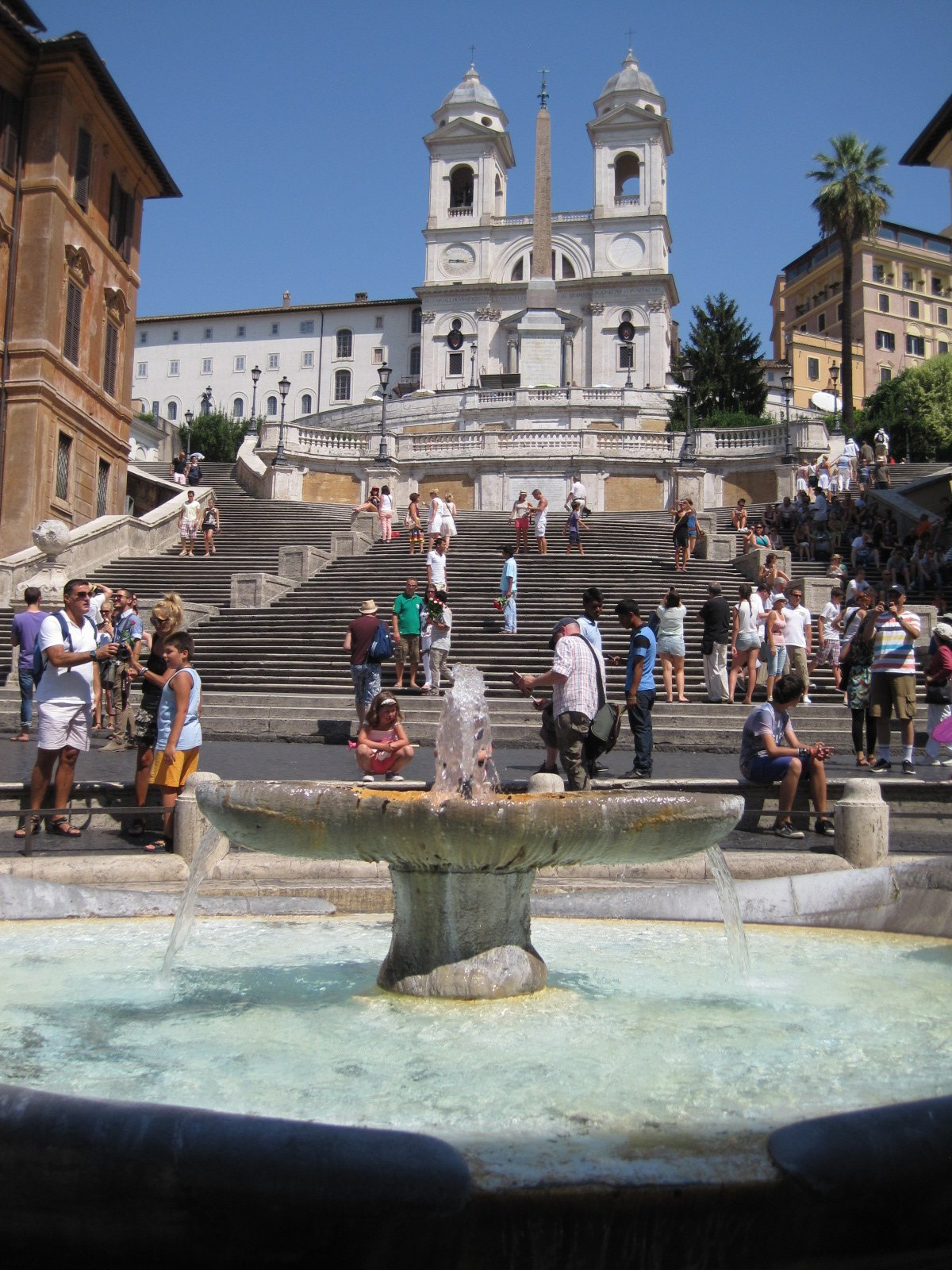
Spanish Steps at Trinità dei Monti

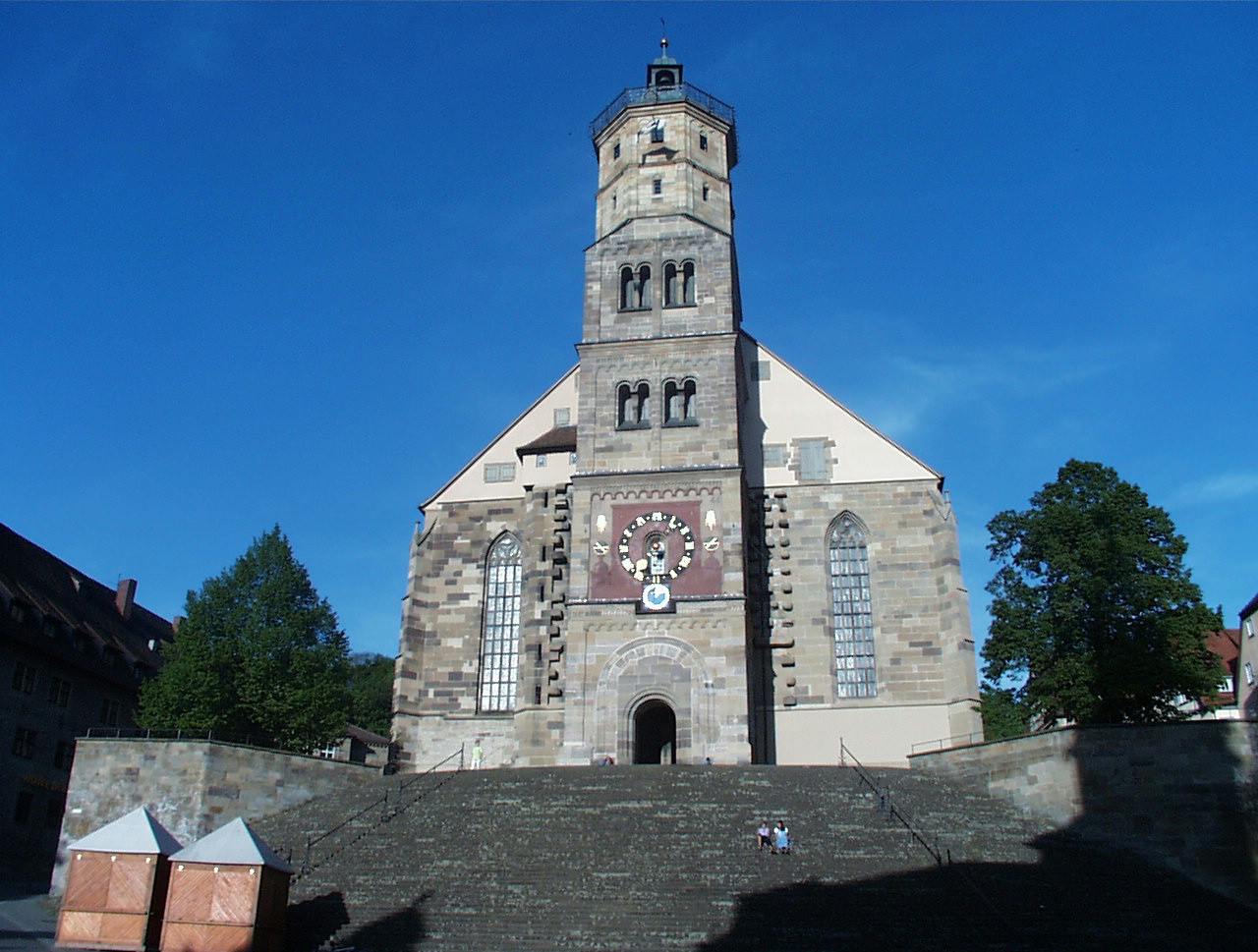
Freilichtspiele Schwäbisch Hall

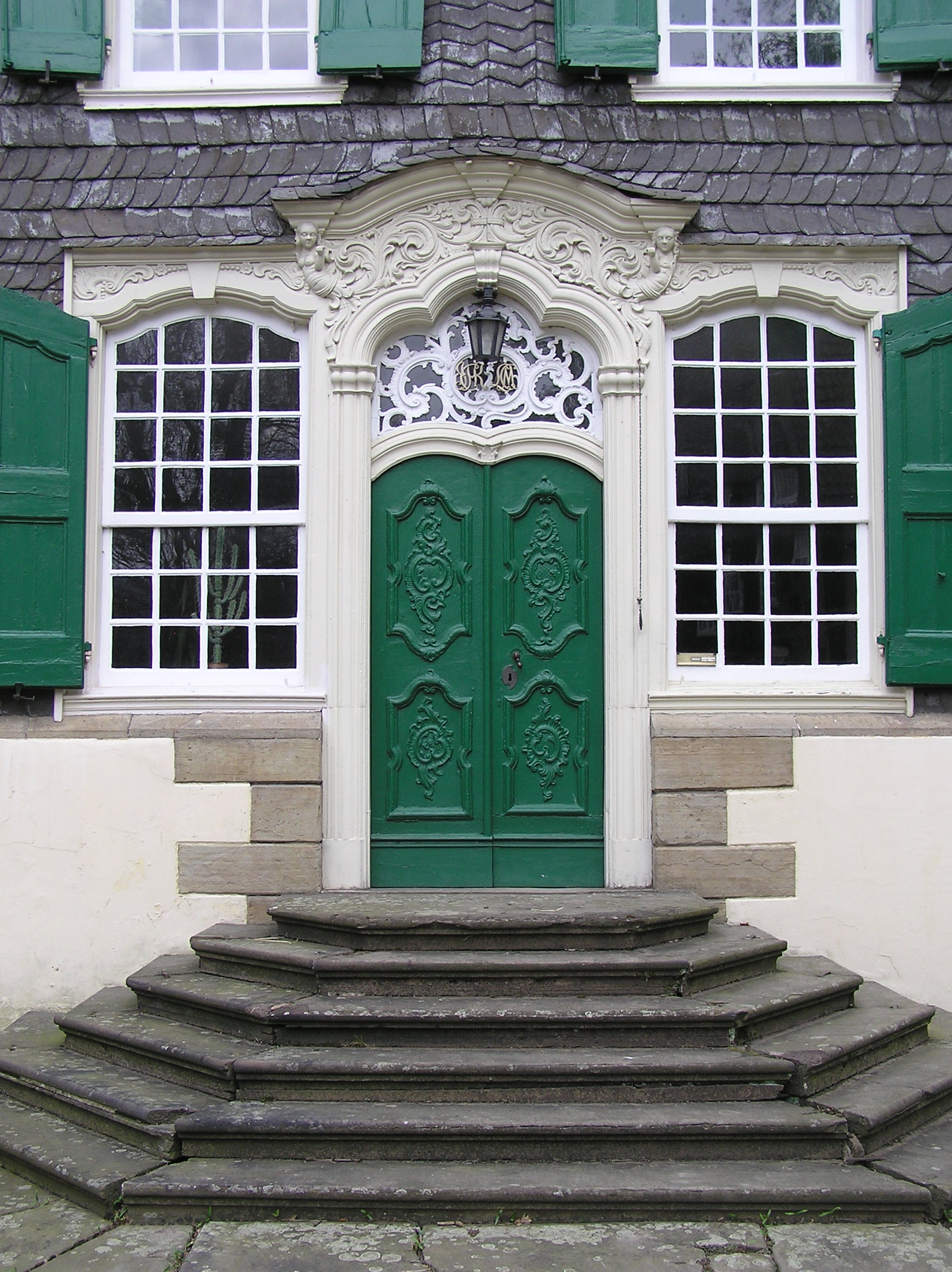
A perron at the entrance to Haus Harkorten in Hagen, Germany

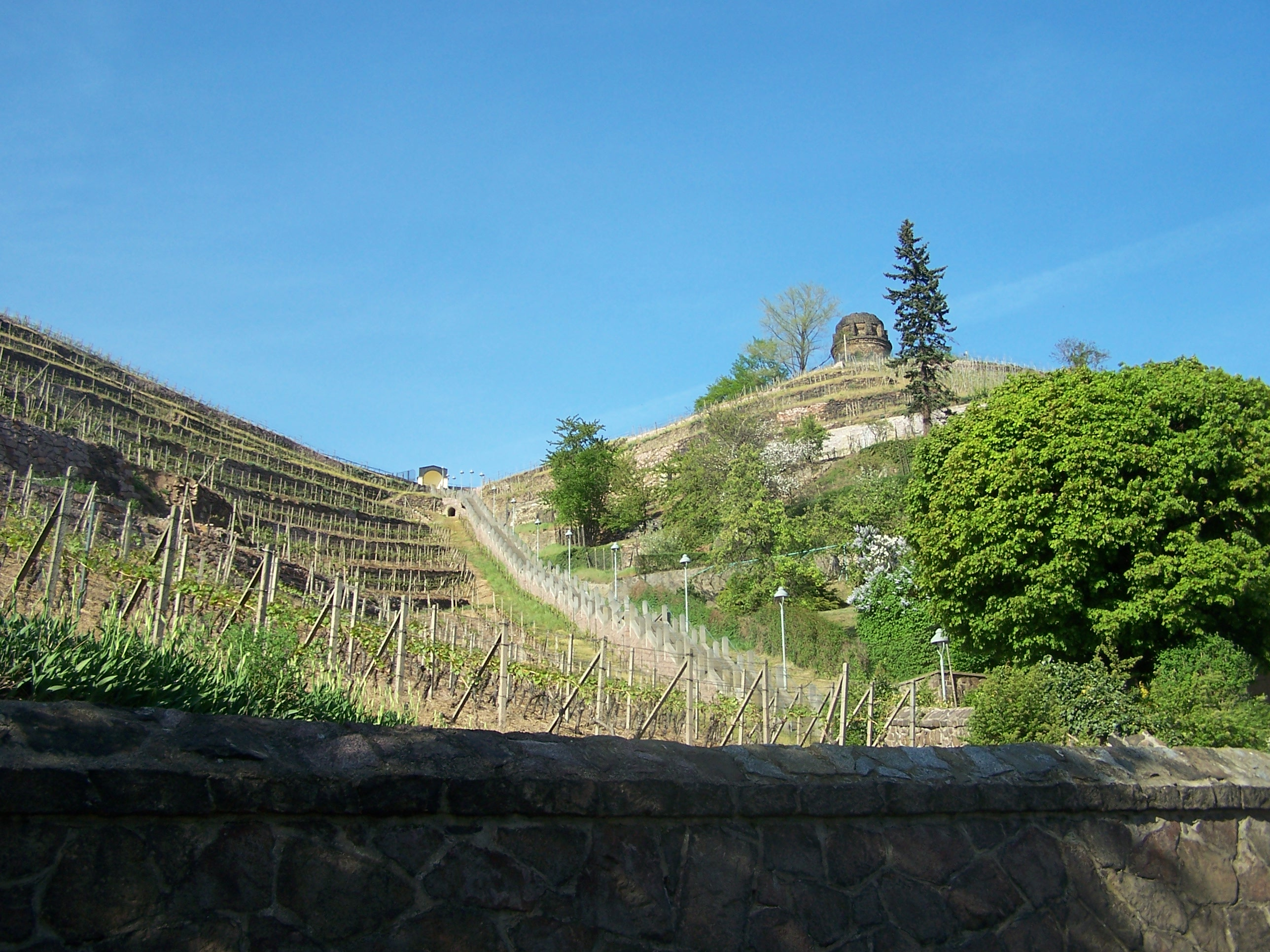
The Spitzhaustreppe stairs at Radebeul lead through the vineyard up to the Lößnitzhöhe. They end at the Bismarck tower near the Spitzhaus.

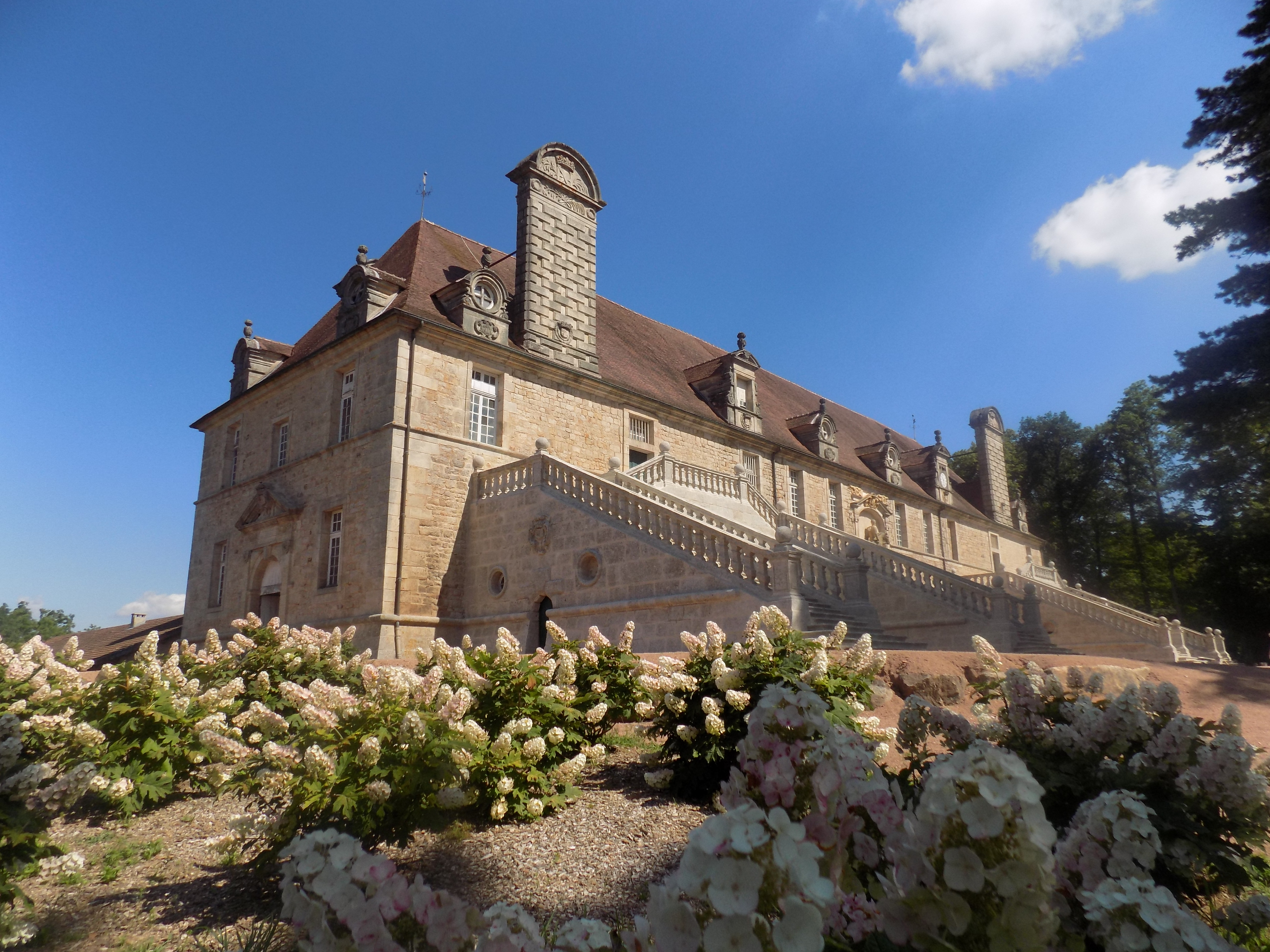
Two perrons lead to the upper floor of François Blondel's 1652 stables at Château de Chaumont-la-Guiche, France

== See also ==
- Step street
