= Peter Strudel =

Austrian artist (c.1660–1714)

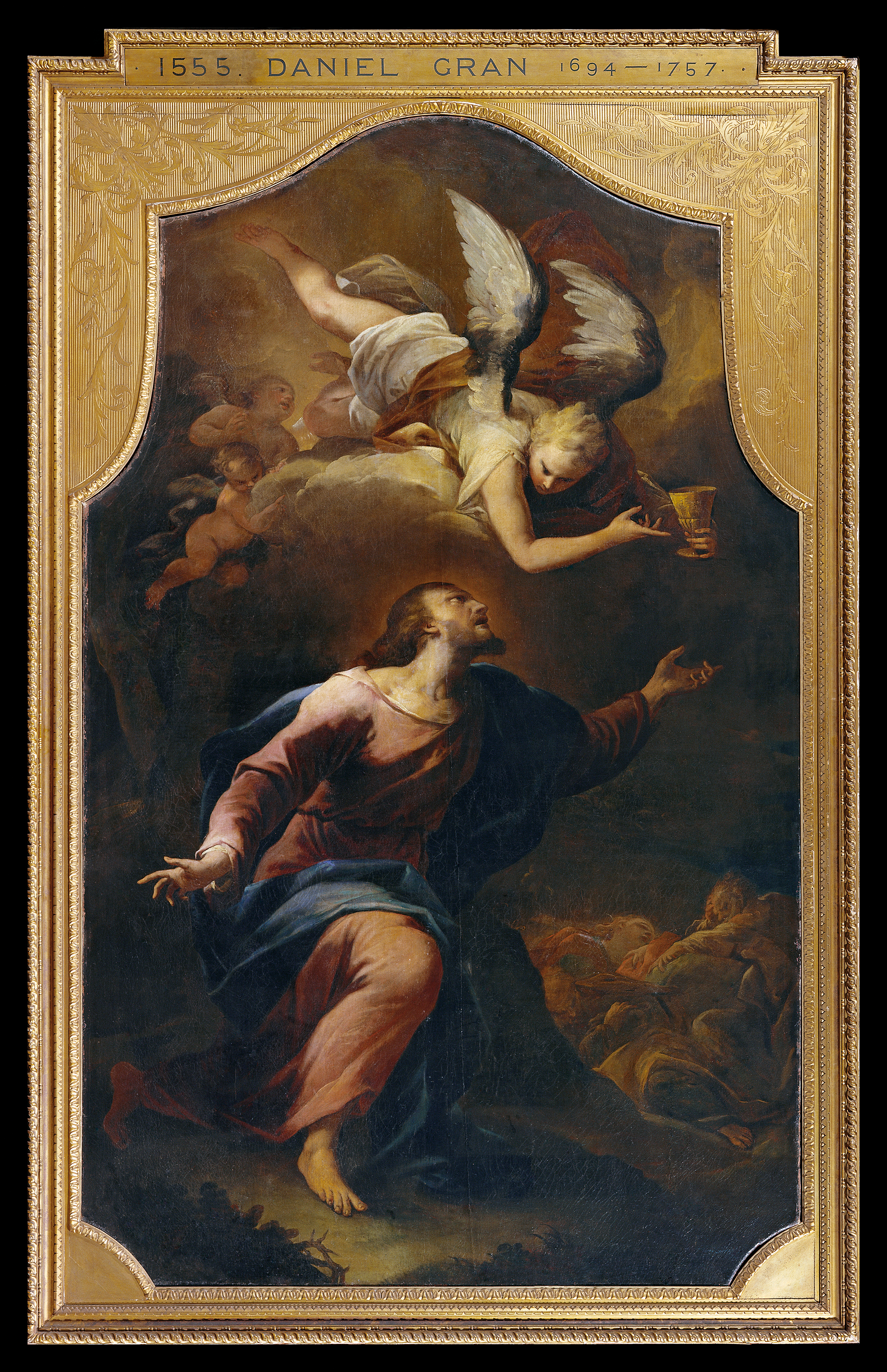
Christ on the Mount of Olives (1712) by Peter Strudel, Österreichische Galerie Belvedere

Peter Strudel or Peter Strudl (ca. 1660 – 4 October 1714) was an Austrian sculptor and painter. His work forms the transition of Austria to the high baroque style.

Strudel was born in Cles, Trentino.

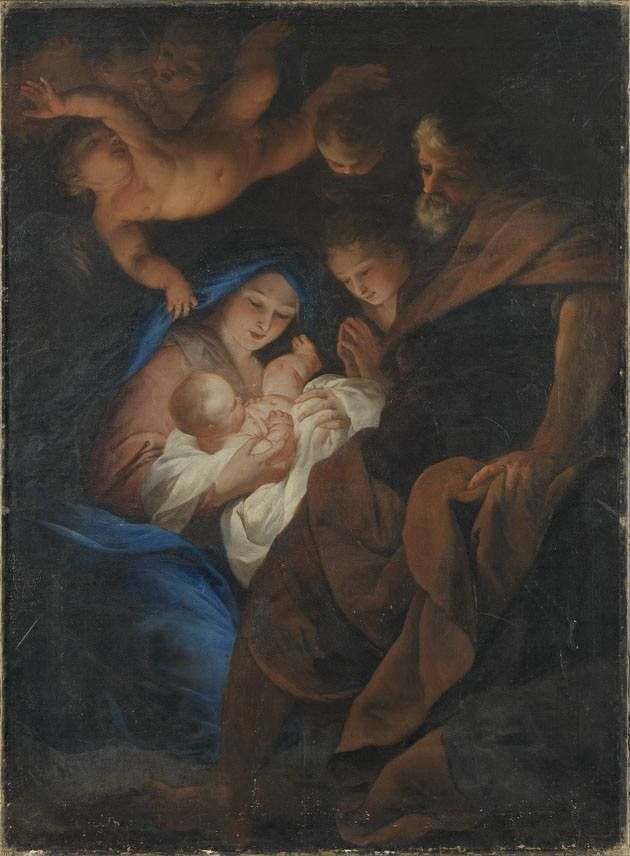
Birth of Christ (c. 1710), Bavarian State Painting Collections

Between 1676 (when he was 16 years old) and 1686, Peter Strudel came to the Hofburg in Vienna and, together with his brother Paul Strudel, obtained a position as painter to the Imperial Court. Around 1690, he bought a property in the suburbs from the imperial "gewesten Hatschieren-Rott" master Romanus Bernhard Tschagon and his wife Marie Polixena. There he built the Strudelhof mansion, where he founded a private art school in 1688. This was the first general training centre for artists outside the painters guild, after the model of the Accademia di San Luca (1593) and that of the French Académie Royale (Académie de peinture et de sculpture, founded in 1648 in Paris). The school has been shown to have received government subsidies from 1692.

In 1701, Peter Strudel (Praefectus Academiae Nostrae) became Reichsfreiherr and was appointed the director of the landscape academy. At the behest of Emperor Joseph I, this school, in 1705, became Kayserliche Academie. However, the activity of the academy temporarily ended with the death of its founder, when Strudel died in 1714.

In 1726, however, a re-establishment took place through Jakob van Schuppen as "K.k. Hofacademie of the painters, sculptor and architecture", which still exists. Peter Strudel is considered as a founder of the oldest art academy of central Europe, the Academy of Fine Arts Vienna. One year before the death of Strudel, the Strudelhof included a plague house, where those afflicted by the epidemic were treated and quarantined.

After several ownership changes between 1795 and 1873, the house was torn down. The newly built house still kept the name "Palace Strudlhof" (Strudelhofgasse 10). The ultimatum to Serbia in 1914, which led to World War I was signed in this house, and in 1970, the disarmament talks between the USSR and the USA of (SALT I) took place there.

Until the Strudelhof was converted in 1999 to its modern rôle as a conference centre, it was used as the embassy of Qatar. Similar to the work of his brother Paul, the work of Peter Strudel also captured the style of sculptor Gian Lorenzo Bernini. Peter Strudel as well as his brother Paul created most of the statues.

Peter Strudel died in Vienna at the age of approximately 55 years. He is still commemorated by the street name Strudlhofgasse in Alsergrund where his house used to stand. The Strudlhofstiege staircase in this lane, together with the Palais Strudlhof earned fame through the novel The Strudlhof Steps by Heimito von Doderer.

== Works ==
- Altar piece in Garsten (1688)
- Altar piece in Stift Klosterneuburg monastery (1690)
- Altar piece of the Rochuskirche in Vienna (1699)
- Statues of Habsburg rulers in the dome area of the Nationalbibliothek (1700)
- Statues of Habsburg rulers in the Schloss Laxenburg (1700)
- Pan with Puttas, National Museum of Serbia
