= Merovingian (disambiguation) =

Merovingian may refer to:

- Merovingian dynasty, family of Frankish kings who ruled an area of modern France and Germany from the 5th to 8th century AD

- Merovingian art and architecture
- Merovingian script

- Merovingian (The Matrix), a character in the films The Matrix Reloaded and The Matrix Revolutions
- Merovingian Music, a non-genre specific record label based out of Red Bank, New Jersey
- The Merowingians (novel), a 1962 novel by Heimito von Doderer

== See also ==
- Merovingen Nights, a series of shared-universe science fiction books set in writer C. J. Cherryh's Alliance–Union universe.
