= Vincent Kling =

Vincent Kling may refer to:

- Vincent Kling (translator) (fl. from 1990), American scholar and translator of German literature
- Vincent Kling (architect) (1916–2013), American architect
