= The Last Adventure =

The Last Adventure may refer to:

- The Last Adventure (1932 film), a 1932 Italian film
- Last Adventure (film), a 1942 French film
- The Last Adventure: A Tale of Knighthood, a 1953 novella by Heimito von Doderer
- The Last Adventure (1967 film), a 1967 French film
- The Last Adventure (1974 film), a 1974 Swedish film
