= The Last Adventure: A Tale of Knighthood =

1953 novella by Heimito von Doderer

The Last Adventure
- Author: Heimito von Doderer
- Original title: Das letzte Abenteuer
- Translator: Vincent Kling
- Language: German
- Publisher: Reclam
- Publication date: 1953
- Publication place: West Germany
- English publication date: 1988
- Pages: 107

The Last Adventure: A Tale of Knighthood (German: Das letzte Abenteuer. Ein Ritter-Roman) is a novella by the Austrian writer Heimito von Doderer, written in 1936 and published in 1953.

== Background ==
Doderer wrote an early version of The Last Adventure in 1917 and developed it further in 1923. The final version was written from 3 September to 7 November 1936.

== Plot ==
In the 14th century, the Spanish knight Ruy de Fanez decides to cross a forest inhabited by a lindworm in order to woo a widowed duchess.

The story is structured like a sonata with four parts. The motif of the knight-errant was inspired by Doderer's personal situation at the time, as he had separated from his wife and turned 40. Both the main character and a troubadour who sings about the duchess and the lindworm are partially literary self-portraits.

== Publication ==
The story was first published by Reclam in 1953. It was republished in 1967 with the addition of an autobiographical afterword. It was translated into English by Vincent Kling and first published in the Southern Humanities Review in 1988. Kling's version was included in the volume A Person Made of Porcelain and Other Stories from 2005.

== Reception ==
When The Last Adventure was republished in German in 2013, Christina Lange of Literaturkritik.de wrote that it uses a melancholic tone and lively language to slowly portray a life crisis. Lange compared it to recent commercially successful fantasy, such as George R. R. Martin's A Song of Ice and Fire and the screen adaptations of J. R. R. Tolkien's works, and wrote that The Last Adventure, despite being older, comes off as a more modern work.

In 2024, the scholar Yvonne Wolf compared The Last Adventure to The Autumn of the Middle Ages, a 1919 book by the Dutch historian Johan Huizinga. Doderer read Huizinga's book in 1927, and Wolf found it likely that it influenced The Last Adventure's philosophy of history and use of colours as metaphors.
