= The Demons (novel) =

1956 novel by Heimito von Doderer

- Author: Heimito von Doderer
- Original title: Die Dämonen
- Translator: Richard and Clara Winston
- Language: German
- Publisher: Biederstein Verlag
- Publication date: 1956
- Publication place: Germany
- English publication date: 1961
- Pages: 1,345

The Demons (German: Die Dämonen) is a 1956 novel by the Austrian writer Heimito von Doderer. It follows a large number of characters in Vienna of the late 1920s.

== Background ==
Heimito von Doderer began to work on The Demons in 1930. He worked meticulously to recreate Vienna of the 1920s and used architectural drawings and similar documents to describe locations in detail. Together with his novels The Lighted Windows (1950) and The Strudlhof Steps (1951), The Demons portrays Viennese social life in the 1910s and 1920s, with the fall of the Austrian monarchy and its impact as backdrop. The German edition has the subtitle Nach der Chronik des Sektionsrates Geyrenhoff (lit. 'According to the Chronicle of the Section Council Geyrenhoff'). This is a nod to the novel Demons by Fyodor Dostoevsky, which features a chronicler named "G...ff".

== Plot ==
The novel has a narrator who looks back from the 1950s to events that took place in Vienna of the late 1920s. The book portrays a large gallery of people, drawn from different urban locations and social groups. The narrative contains many branches and follows around 50 people as they go through developments. Among the more prominent characters are a man who half-jokingly is obsessed with fat women, a woman who laments not being a musician, a weaver who studies Latin, and a rich boy who is fascinated by the study of history. The novel concludes with the riot and fire at the Palace of Justice on 15 July 1927.

== Reception ==
The book was a major critical success in the German-speaking world. Critics compared it to the works of Dostoevsky, Dante Alighieri, Leo Tolstoy and Honoré de Balzac. The critic Klaus Nüchtern described its scale and structure as a development of the architecture of Gothic cathedrals. When it was published in English in 1961, Kirkus Reviews wrote that the book reconstructs "the whole texture and detail of a society" where the components "are welded together by astonishing, lucid perceptions of the most peripheral insights and relations". The critic called it "a complex and brilliant reading experience".
