= Every Man a Murderer =

1938 novel by Heimito von Doderer

- Author: Heimito von Doderer
- Original title: Ein Mord, den jeder begeht
- Translator: Richard and Clara Winston
- Language: German
- Publisher: C. H. Beck
- Publication date: 1938
- Publication place: Germany
- English publication date: 1964
- Pages: 445

Every Man a Murderer (German: Ein Mord, den jeder begeht) is a 1938 novel by the Austrian writer Heimito von Doderer. It is about a man who becomes obsessed with his wife's sister who died on a train a few years earlier. The book was published in English translation in 1964.
