= Strudlhofstiege =

Stairs in Austria

Coordinates: 48°13′20″N 16°21′28″E

- Strudlhof Steps
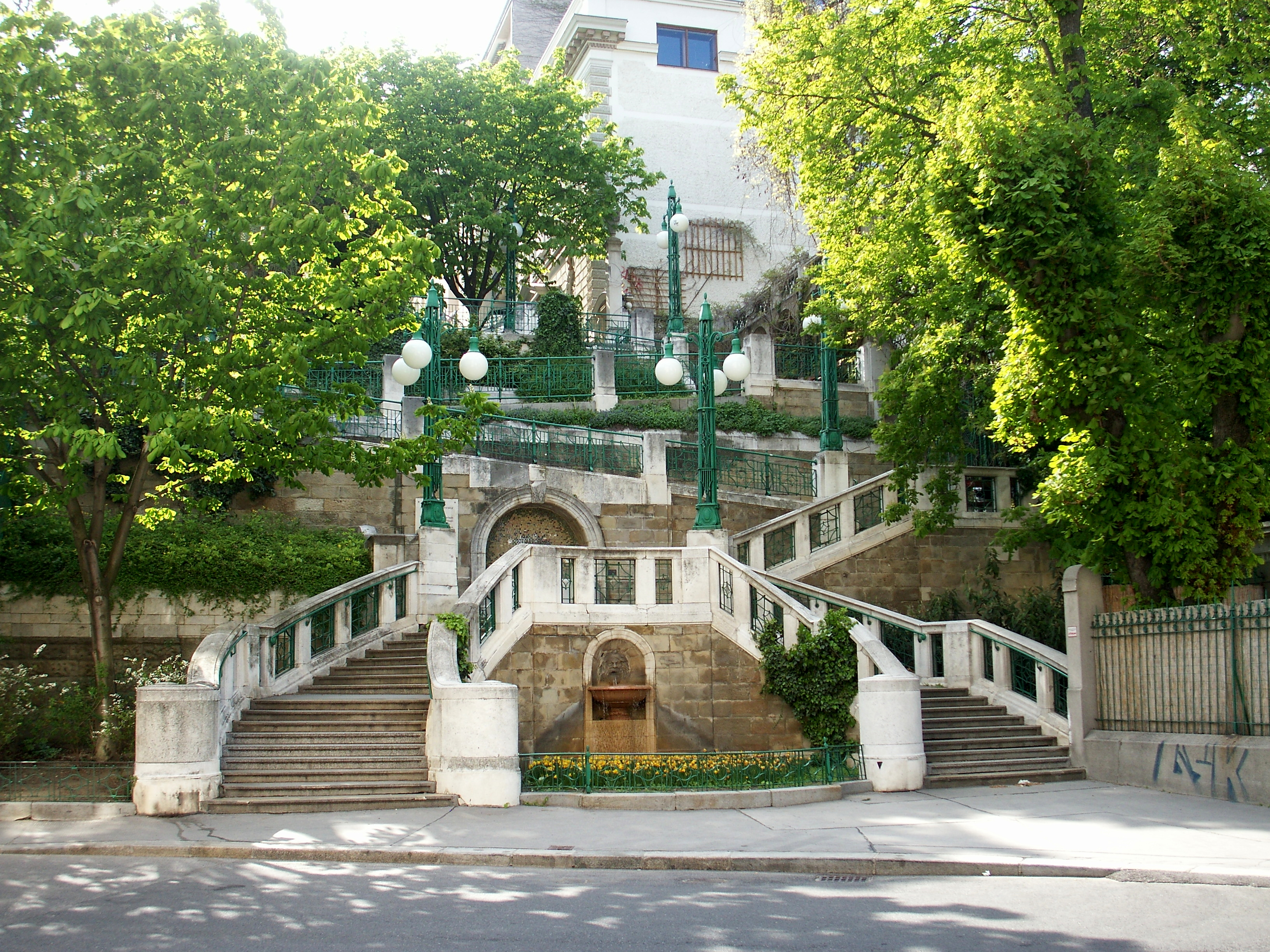
- The stairs in 2008
- Interactive map of Strudlhofstiege

The Strudlhofstiege (also known as the Strudlhof Steps) is an outdoor staircase of architectural and literary significance in Vienna, Austria. Located in the Alsergrund district, inside of Vienna’s 9th district between Liechtensteinstrasse and Währinger Strasse. It is named after a former art school run by the painter Peter Strudel (c. 1660 – 1714).

== History ==
Sometime around 1680, Peter Strudel together with his brother Paul Strudel came to Vienna from Cles, Trentino. He settled in the northern suburb where he opened his Strudlhof painting school in 1688, one of the first art colleges in Central Europe. Modelled on the Accademia di San Luca or the Académie royale de peinture et de sculpture in Paris, it was the precursor of the present-day Vienna Academy of Fine Arts. After Strudel's death, however, teaching activities ceased and the Strudlhof was demolished. The present-day Palais Strudlhof, used as a hotel and conference centre, was erected in the late 18th century.

The adjacent street was named Strudlhofgasse in 1907. Shortly afterwards, the Vienna city administration under Mayor Karl Lueger resolved upon the construction of a staircase at the end of the street, in order to create a facilitated access to the lower Lichtental terrain level beyond. The designs were supplied by the architect Theodor Johann Jaeger (1874–1943), an employee at the municipal planning office. Built from luminescent Mannersdorf limestone, it today rates as an Art Nouveau (Jugendstil) masterpiece, resembling the Stadtbahn architecture by Otto Wagner. The stairs were ceremonially opened on 29 November 1910 and since have been restored several times.

== Structure ==
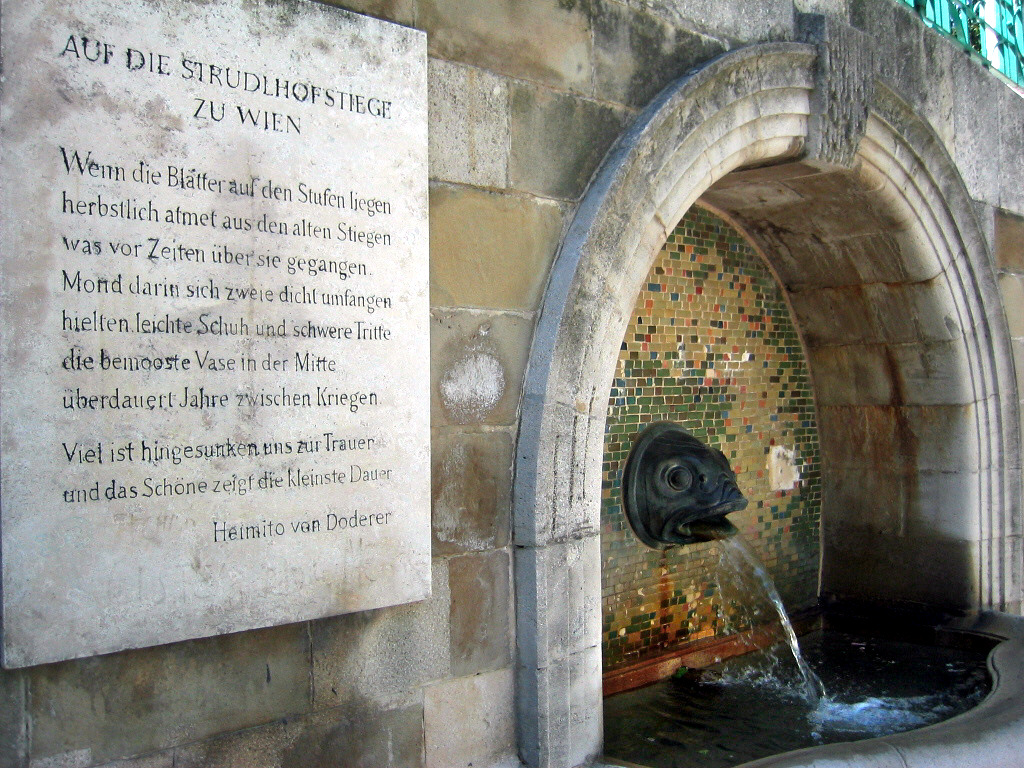
Fountain and plaque containing the poem Auf die Strudelhofstiege zu Wien by Heimito von Doderer

The symmetric lower part of the staircase is centered on two fountains, with a facial mask, and a fish head as a waterspout. The upper, asymmetric part gives pedestrians varying perspectives while passing by. Metal railings and candelabras create additional highlights. The picturesque construction is a popular setting for open-air choir and concert events.

== In culture ==
- The Austrian author Heimito von Doderer (1896-1966) wrote the 1951 social novel The Strudlhof Steps or Melzer and the Depth of the Years (Die Strudlhofstiege oder Melzer und die Tiefe der Jahre), one of the main works of 20th century Austrian literature.
- A movie titled Strudlhofstiege was released on 8 December 2009.
