= Heinrich von Hügel =

German architect (1828-1899)

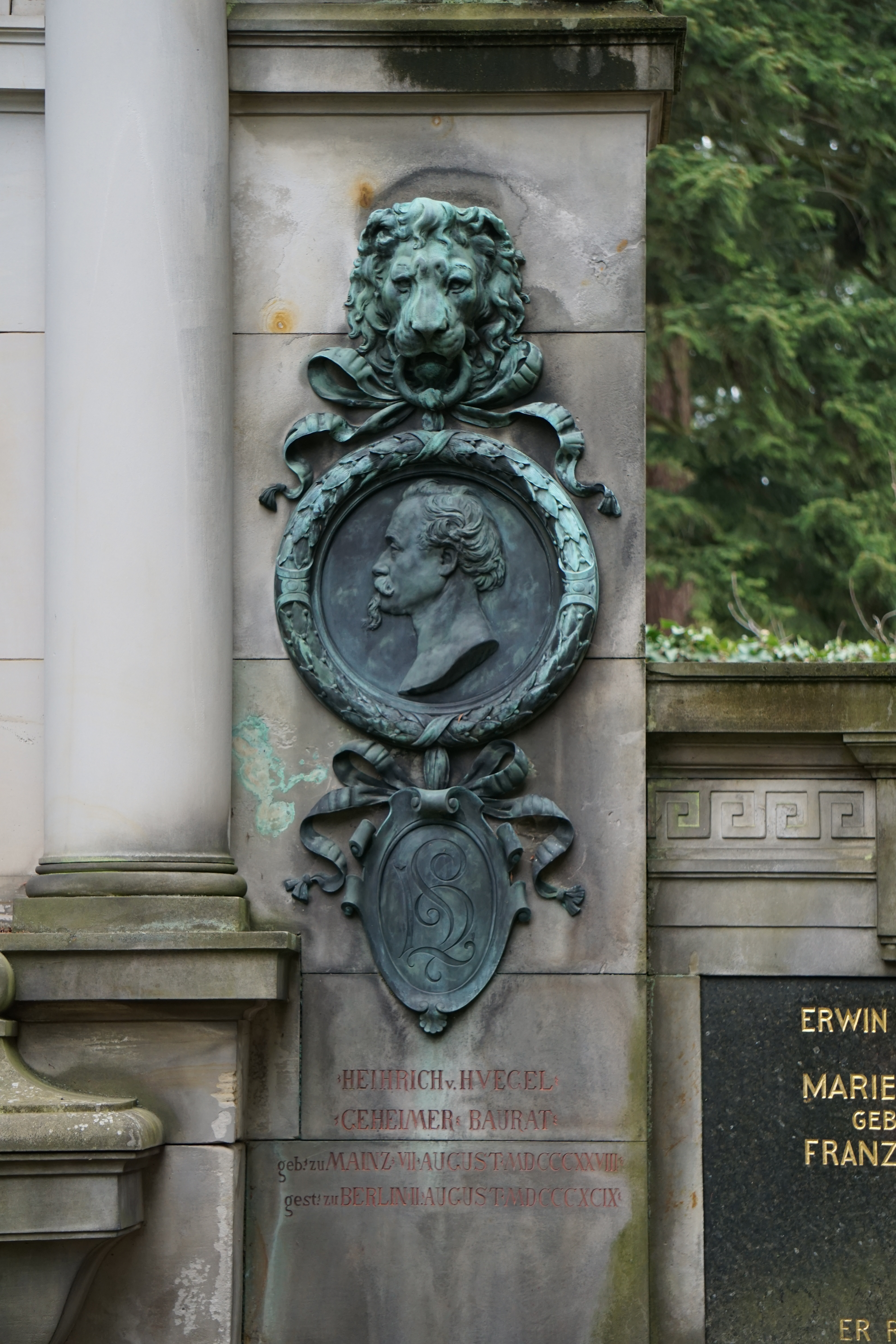
- Grave of Heinrich von Hügel in the Alter Friedhof in Darmstadt
- Born: 7 August 1828; Mainz, Germany
- Died: 2 August 1899 (aged 70); Charlottenburg, Germany

Georg Heinrich Hügel, known since 1875 as Ritter von Hügel (7 August 1828 - 2 August 1899) was a German architect and railway construction contractor.

== Life ==
Heinrich von Hügel came from a middle-class background. His father, railway inspector David Martin Hügel (1794–1875), had first become a Rhine shipowner in Mainz and later a freight forwarder for the Grand Ducal Hesse Main-Weser Railway in Giessen. In 1822 he married Margarethe née Brehm (1799–1839). The couple first had two daughters and then twin sons.

His first wife, Marie Luise née Vietor (1836–1890), married Heinrich von Hügel on June 10, 1857 in Darmstadt. He had four daughters with her. The second-born, Johanne Caroline Louise (1862–1946), married Hügel's senior employee and later building contractor Wilhelm Carl von Doderer (1855–1932). Another daughter, Friederike Charlotte (1863–1949), married the Austrian architect Max von Ferstel (1859–1936). Heinrich von Hügel also had a grandson, the Austrian writer Heimito von Doderer, who later became very famous.

Heinrich von Hügel married his second wife, Anna Louise (Aenny née Garbe; 1870–1931), in Berlin on 15 September 1891. The marriage produced two daughters: Elisabeth (1892–1892) and Erika Marianne Henriette (born 1893), who married Raimund Heinrich Adalbert von Gleichen on 16 July 1919 in Berlin.

== Career ==
After passing a "special examination in construction" in Darmstadt in 1850, he found employment in railway construction in the Circle of the Rhine from 1854 to 1856. He then made a name for himself in the 1850s and 1860s as chief director architect of the Bavarian Eastern Railway. In this role, he planned and built railway lines and the associated operational buildings. This included the Regensburg Central Station, which opened in 1859, but had to make way for a new building further north in 1886. A carriage depot designed by him has been preserved as a Regensburg architectural monument and was relocated to its current location near the train station east of the Galgenberg Bridge in 1888. The hall is now used as a school building for the Music College under the name Lokschuppen.

Later, Heinrich von Hügel became self-employed as an architect in Munich and built the armory and the palace for Adolf Friedrich von Schack. He also built the Villa Kustermann in Tutzing and, in 1867, the theater in Franzensbad (today Františkovy Lázně, Czech Republic).

In Regensburg, in 1868, after the demolition of the city wall, von Hügel built the first city palace in the Renaissance style for the private citizen Johann Gschwendtner in the area of the green belt of the Fürstenallee on the foundations of the city wall and the Roman wall. The elegant building, reminiscent of Schinkel's pavilion in the Charlottenburg Palace Park, housed the district leadership of the NSDAP during the Nazi era. It was officially called the Ostmarkhaus, but was generally known as the Schwarzhaupt Villa after the previous Jewish owner. In 1935, the city extorted the villa from the widow of the wholesaler Schwarzhaupt for a ridiculous price. After the war, the villa was demolished in 1955 to make way for a new building for the Regensburg Chamber of Commerce and Industry. In Bad Kissingen, Heinrich von Hügel had the casino built between 1878 and 1880 in collaboration with his construction manager Wilhelm Carl von Doderer. According to his plans and under his construction, the Alice Hospital in Darmstadt (Dieburger Straße 21) was completed in 1883. In order to support this charitable project, von Hügel waived his fee.

== Awards and honors ==
Heinrich Hügel received various honours for his services. In 1867 he was appointed Grand Ducal Hessian Geheimen Baurat and in 1883 he was appointed Royal Bavarian Building Councillor. In 1875 Heinrich Hügel was awarded the Order of Merit of the Bavarian Crown in the Kingdom of Bavaria and thus raised to the personal nobility for life. In 1881 he was awarded with ennoblement in Austria-Hungary.

== Bibliography ==
- Anton Bettelheim (Hrsg.): Biographisches Jahrbuch und deutscher Nekrolog. Band 4, Reimer, Berlin 1902, S. 149.
- (in German) Heinrich von Hügel. In: Ulrich Thieme, Felix Becker (editors): Allgemeines Lexikon der Bildenden Künstler von der Antike bis zur Gegenwart. Leipzig, 1907 ff.
- Eduard Grimmel: Hessisches Geschlechterbuch. C. A. Starke, Limburg an Lahn 1964, S. 240 f. und S. 249 f.
- Wolfgang Fleischer: Heimito von Doderer. Das Leben. Das Umfeld des Werks in Fotos und Dokumenten. Kremayr & Scheriau, Wien 1995, ISBN 3-218-00603-1, S. 11 ff.
- Wolfgang Fleischer: Das verleugnete Leben. Die Biographie des Heimito von Doderer. Kremayr & Scheriau, Wien 1996, ISBN 3-218-00619-8, S. 14 f., S. 17 f., S. 22, S. 24 ff., S. 33, S. 41 und S. 44.
