= The Merowingians (novel) =

1962 novel by Heimito von Doderer

- Author: Heimito von Doderer
- Original title: Die Merowinger
- Translator: Vinal Binner
- Language: German
- Publisher: Biederstein Verlag
- Publication date: 1962
- Publication place: Germany
- English publication date: 1996
- Pages: 368

The Merowingians or The Total Family (German: Die Merowinger oder Die totale Familie) is a 1962 novel by the Austrian writer Heimito von Doderer. It interweaves a contemporary family with the medieval Merovingian dynasty and is about a man who tries to create "the total family" by marrying his step-family members. In 2018, Die Welt described the novel as "by far the funniest and strangest in the oeuvre of this highly funny and most strange author".

The book was adapted into the 1981 film Die totale Familie.
