= Paul Strudel =

Austrian artist (c.1648–1708)

Baron von Strudel and Vochburg
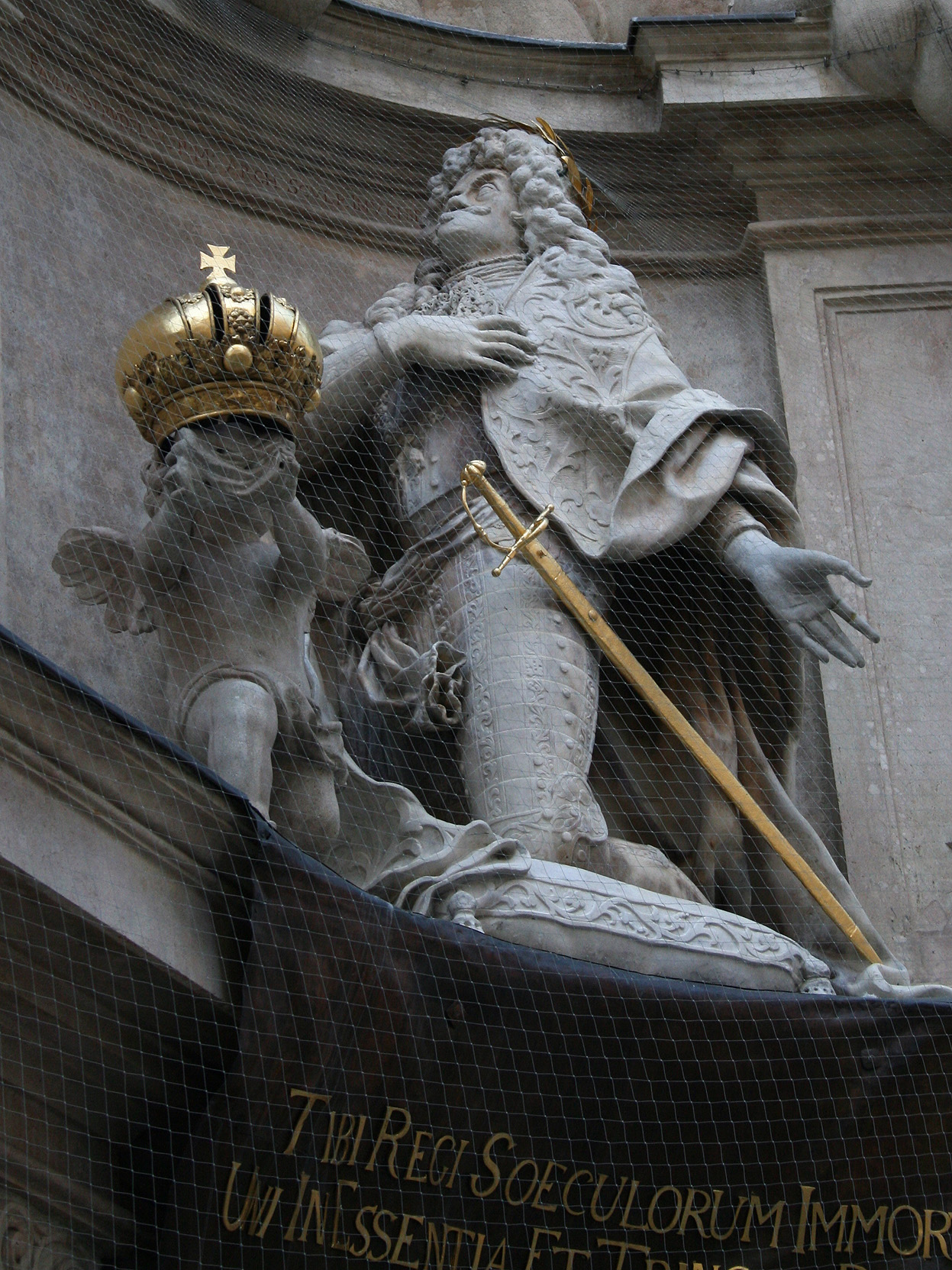
- Statue of Leopold I, Holy Roman Emperor in Vienna, Austria
- Born: Paul Strudl; 1648; Cles, County of Tyrol
- Died: 20 November 1708 (aged 59–60); Vienna, Austria
- Known for: sculptor, architect, engineer, and painter

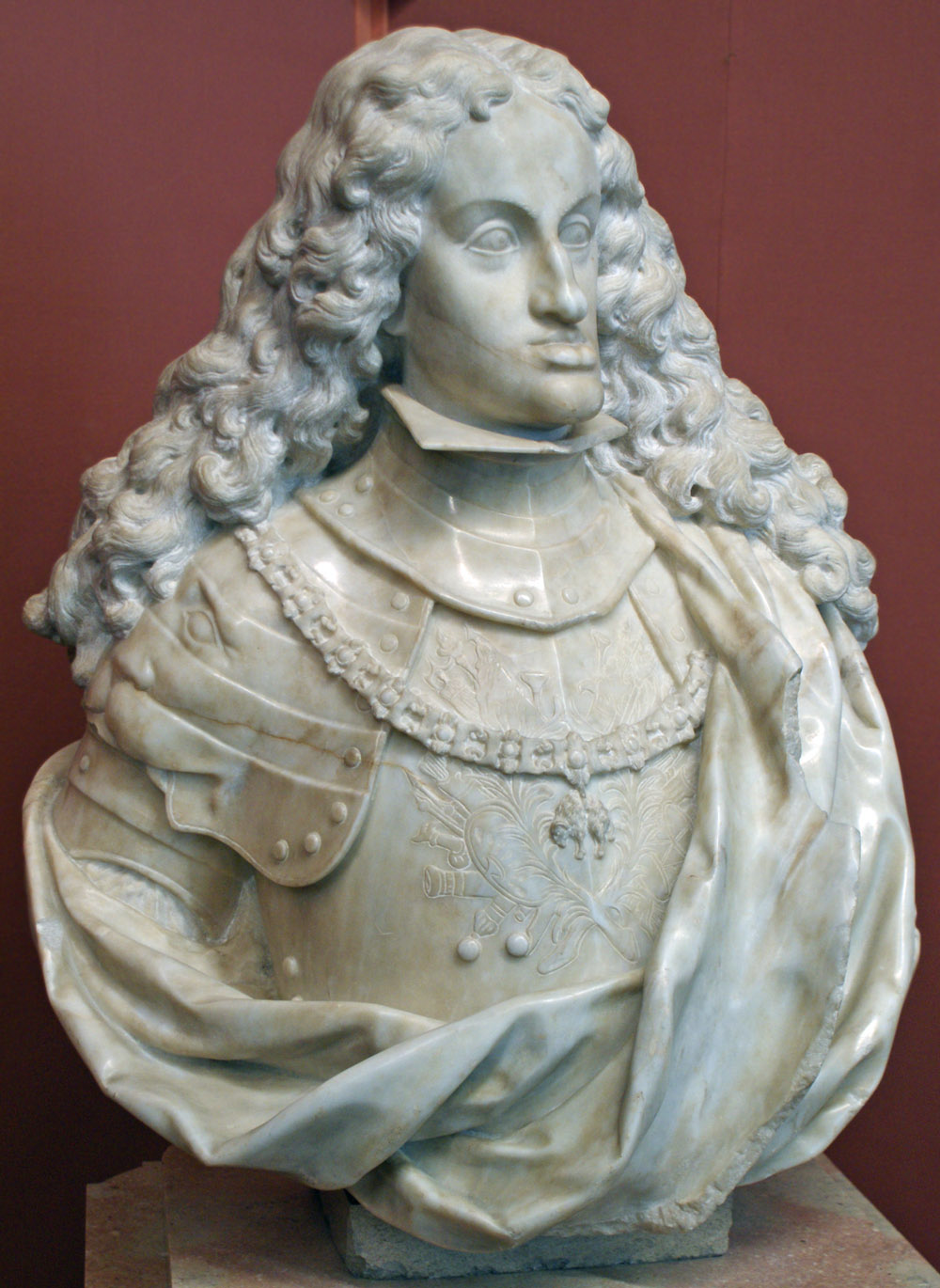
Marble bust of Charles II of Spain, 1695 (Kunsthistorisches Museum).

Paul Strudel or Paul Strudl (c. 1648 – 20 November 1708) was an Austrian sculptor, architect, engineer, and painter, ennobled as Baron von Strudel and Vochburg.

As a sculptor in the Hofburg, Paul Strudel worked creating statues with his younger brother, Peter Strudel.

== Life ==
In 1648, Paul Strudel was born, as would be his younger brothers, Peter and Dominik, in Cles in the Val di Non in the County of Tyrol, where his father Jakob worked as a sculptor. Paul learned with his father and with Johann Carl Loth in Venice. In 1684, he came to Vienna, where he made three statues for the Prince of Liechtenstein; his high remuneration caused the envy of his German colleagues at that time.

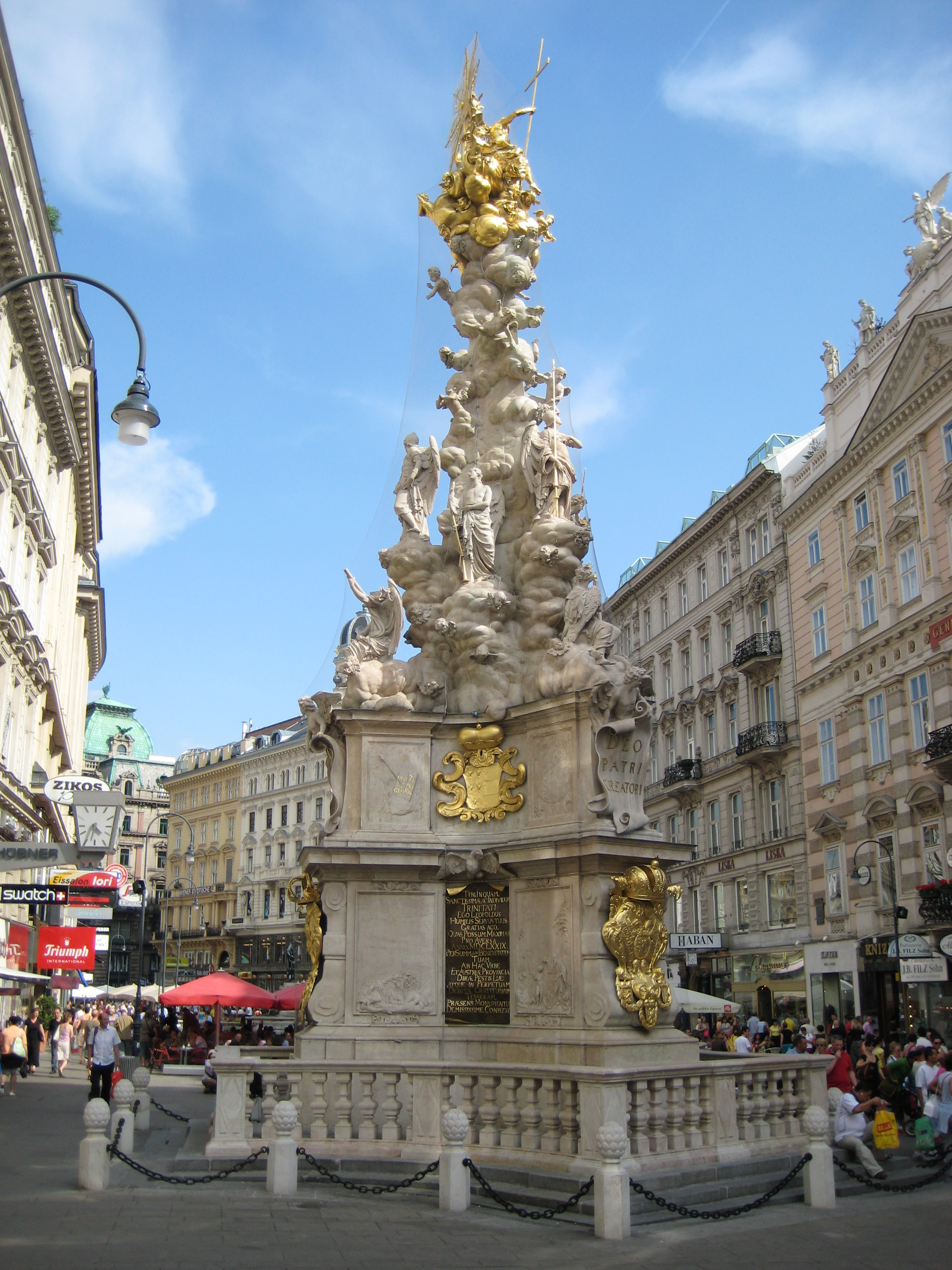
The Plague Column

Paul Strudel came in 1686 to the Hofburg court in Vienna and obtained employment as a Court painter. Mostly he co-operated with his brother Peter Strudel. His work marks the transition of Austria to the high baroque; however, Strudel captured the style of Gian Lorenzo Bernini.

The most important works of Paul Strudel are the large statues from white marble for the ancestor gallery of the Habsburgs. In 1696, he received the statuary order from Emperor Leopold I, on the condition to deliver, every three years, two figures. Up to his death, he had delivered 16 figures: the remaining 15 (of the total 31) statues were created by his younger brother.

Strudel was responsible for overseeing the design and construction of Vienna's Plague Column from 1686 until its completion in 1693. He was also commissioned by the prince of Liechtenstein, Prince-Bishop Karl Eusebius von Liechtenstein, to create some monumental statues for his Moravian palaces in Valtice and Lednice.

Due to changing tastes in art during the early eighteenth century, it was not possible for the Hofburg Court Architect Giovanni Pietro Tencalla (de:Giovanni Pietro Tencalla) to introduce Paul Strudel (or his brother Peter) as his successor. The German building master Johann Lucas von Hildebrandt from Genoa was preferred over the Strudel brothers.

At the age of approximately 60 years, Paul Strudel died on 20 November 1708 in Vienna.

== Works ==
- 1699 – Statues of the Habsburg rulers in the dome area of the Imperial Library, Hofbibliothek.
- 1700 – Statues of the Habsburg rulers in Schloss Laxenburg.

== See also ==
- Hofburg Imperial Palace - describes buildings with statues by Paul Strudel.
