= Vincent Kling (translator) =

American scholar and translator

Vincent Kling is an American scholar and translator of German literature. He studied at La Salle University, the University of Pennsylvania and Temple University. His PhD thesis was based on the works of Hugo von Hofmannsthal. He also spent some time at Georg-August-Universität in Göttingen, Germany, and later taught at the University of Vienna under a Fulbright scholarship.

Kling's scholarly interests are wide-ranging, and he has published on subjects as diverse as Johann Breitwieser, Rainer Werner Fassbinder, Anthony Hecht, Aglaja Veteranyi and W.G. Sebald. As a prominent scholar of Austrian literature, he has written on the works of Austrian writers such as Heimito von Doderer, Heimrad Bäcker, Lilian Faschinger, Andreas Pittler, Ödön von Horváth, Gert Jonke and Gerhard Fritsch.

Kling won the Schlegel-Tieck Prize for his translation of Aglaja Veteranyi's novel Why the Child Is Cooking in the Polenta. He has also translated Gert Jonke's The System of Vienna: From Heaven Street to Earth Mound Square. He received the 2022 Helen and Kurt Wolff Translator's Prize for his translation of Doderer's The Strudlhof Steps for the NYRB Classics series.
