= The Strudlhof Steps (novel) =

1951 novel by Heimito von Doderer

- Title page for Die Strudlhofstiege oder Melzer und die Tiefe der Jahre (1965)
- Author: Heimito von Doderer
- Original title: Die Strudlhofstiege
- Translator: Vincent Kling
- Language: German
- Publisher: Biederstein Verlag
- Publication date: 1951
- Publication place: West Germany
- English publication date: 7 September 2021
- Pages: 908

The Strudlhof Steps: or, Melzer and the Depth of the Years (German: Die Strudlhofstiege oder Melzer und die Tiefe der Jahre) is a 1951 novel by the Austrian writer Heimito von Doderer. It is set in Vienna in the 1920s and portrays a large number of mostly well-off characters, connected by their proximity to the Strudlhofstiege, an outdoor staircase. The novel gives emphasis to location and language rather than actions of the characters.

The book was a critical success at its original publication. Retrospective critics have praised its sense of timelessness, style and portrayal of Viennese society. It has been grouped with Doderer's novels The Lighted Windows (1950) and The Demons (1956), which provide a detailed panorama of Vienna in the 1910s and 1920s. A poem by Doderer that opens The Strudlhof Steps has been placed on a plaque at the Strudlhofstiege. The novel was adapted into an Austrian television film in 1987.

== Background ==
The Austrian writer Heimito von Doderer had served in World War I and became a moderately successful novelist in Vienna in the 1930s. He became a member of the Nazi Party in 1933, served in the Wehrmacht during World War II and was a war prisoner in Oslo. He developed ideas for The Strudlhof Steps in his diaries during the war and began to write the novel in American-occupied Upper Austria in 1945. He was eventually able to move back to Vienna, where he continued to work on the large-scale novel, finishing it in 1948.

In the second half of the 1940s, Doderer lived on little food and worked on three novels—The Lighted Windows, The Strudlhof Steps and The Demons—while being subjected to denazification and undergoing gradual rehabilitation. He had stopped sympathising with National Socialism in 1938, instead turning toward Austrian subjects, Catholicism and the private world, but because of his party background, he was still forbidden from publishing at the time he finished The Strudlhof Steps. The Lighted Windows was published in 1950 and has been described as a precursor to The Strudlhof Steps due to its Viennese setting and narrative mode.

== Plot ==
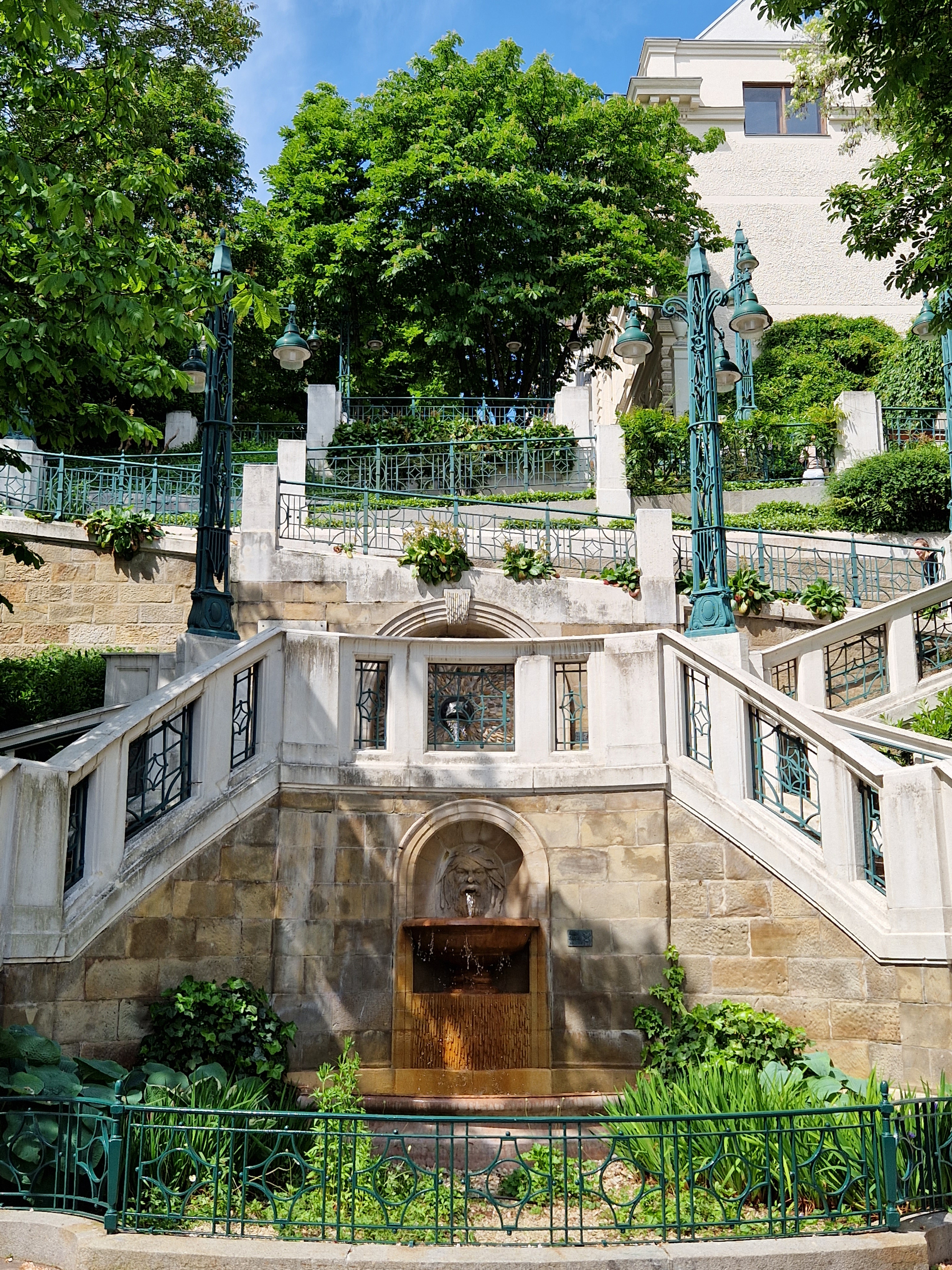
The Strudlhofstiege in 2023

It is the 1920s and Melzer, who served as a lieutenant for the Austro-Hungarian Army in the Balkans, is back living in his home city of Vienna. Melzer becomes an observer of his own life, the people of Vienna and the city itself, recurringly spending time at the Strudlhofstiege, an Art Nouveau staircase with terraces and fountains that has become a symbol for the city.

There are scenes from 1923 to 1925, and most prominently August–September 1925, as well as memories from the period 1908–1911 and especially the summer of 1911. Although World War I and the fall of the Austrian monarchy took place during the period covered, they are almost not commented on at all by the characters, and the narrator argues that war, as it is a collective experience, is of little relevance for the human self-knowledge he is interested in. Melzer becomes a de facto background character as the book portrays the daily lives, minds and pastimes of dozens of people connected by the stairs.

The different plot lines and large character gallery are occasionally woven together but do not add up to any central plot. The characters are mostly from the upper social strata of Viennese society, including the families of military officers, businessmen, government officials and lawyers, but there are also lower-level employees in the city's bureaucracy, who often live in the Alsergrund district below the Strudlhofstiege. Melzer has this lower-middle-class background but has the opportunity to marry a woman from a prominent family at the end of the novel.

== Major Characters ==
Mary K. • had a relationship with Melzer in 1910; • married Oscar in 1910; • book starts with her in late summer 1923 when she stands up Dr. Negria; • lives above the Siebenscheins; • takes piano lessons from Grete Siebenschein; • doesn't like Rene Stangeler because he makes Grete unhappy; • doesn't like Eulenfeld either; • Oscar dies from something like cancer in Feb. 1924; • as a friend of Fraunholzer's wife Mädi, she knows about their marriage falling apart in 1925; she pieces together from Grete that Etelka is the one causing this break; • Mary wants Mädi and Fraunholzer to stay together, in homage to her own marriage. • in Sept. 1925, her son is almost 14 and her daughter is almost 15; she sees Dr. Negria at the tennis club and he tells her about seeing Fraunholzer and Etelka at the dance; • she talks to Lea Fraunholzer on the phone and arranges to meet her; Grete stops by and she tries to get her to stay for tea so that she can hear the news from Budapest from Rene when he gets home, but it goes too late so she leaves; she is distracted when she sees Dr. Negria and she gets run over by a street car; Melzer and Thea administer first aid (Mon., Sept. 21, 1925). • Melzer and Thea visit Mary in the hospital (Sat., Sept. 26, 1925); • Melzer and Thea also visit her on their wedding day.

Oscar K. • husband of Mary K.; • lives above the Siebenscheins; • plays tennis with Semski; • Oscar dies from something like cancer in Feb. 1924.

Dr. Negria • Romanian physician; • admirer of Mary K.; • plays tennis with Semski; • at the dance in the country on Aug. 29, 1925; • he goes for a drive with Melzer, Editha, Eulenfeld, Angelika Scheichsbeutel, Kajetan and wife, Geyrenhoff, and others (Sat., Sept. 5, 1925); • Mary K. sees him right before she gets hit by the street car (Mon., Sept. 21, 1925).

Kajetan von S. (aka Dr. Döblinger) • author; divorcee; former son-in-law of Dr. Schedik; friend of Eulenfeld; • takes Geyrenhoff to the café; • convinces Rosa Zihal to have her husband's portrait painted; • he goes for a drive with Melzer, Editha, Negria, Angelika Scheichsbeutel, his wife, Eulenfeld, Geyrenhoff, and others (Sat., Sept. 5, 1925).

Cavalry Captain Otto Eulenfeld (aka Rittmeister; Master of Horse; Disaster of Course; the Captain; Otto) • wears a monocle; • friend of Kajetan and Melzer; • spent 1918-1922 abroad; • rides in the car with Melzer and Editha in 1923; • in spring 1925, Editha and Melzer meet at his place; • dates Thea Rokitzer in 1925; • he asks Thea to take "Editha's" passport to the post office to pick up a letter (July 11, 1925); • in July 1925, Eulenfeld tries to get some tobacco products from Thea's aunt and gets upset when she botches the request; • in 1925 Mimi and Eulenfeld are out in Vienna and Ingrid, now Frau von Budau, cuts "Editha" again; • he calls Rene in Vienna to ask him to keep "Editha" company the next day, though he knows it's really Mimi (August 21, 1925); • he meets up with Rene and Melzer going to Editha's place and gets drunk (Aug. 24, 1925); • he's having a party with Dolly Storch, Leucht, Thea, Editha; it is revealed that the concierge of Editha's building (Hawelka) is friends with the concierge of Eulenfeld's building (Wöss)(Aug. 29, 1925); • he goes for a drive with Melzer, Editha, Negria, Angelika Scheichsbeutel, Kajetan and wife, Geyrenhoff, and others (Sat., Sept. 5, 1925); • he is with Editha and Mimi; they are planning to reveal the twins to Melzer, but Thea comes instead; the authorities come with a warrant to search Eulenfeld and Editha's apartments concerning the tobacco scheme; luckily, Thea just pocketed the papers with the official signatures (Mon., Sept. 21, 1925); • Eulenfeld, Mimi, and Editha reveal the twin escapade to Melzer (Oct. 2, 1925); • he facilitates the twins' meeting with their parents and rides on a horse in the Prater; • attends Melzer's wedding.

Lieutenant Melzer (later Major; then civil service councillor) • friend of Eulenfeld, who taught him how to drive; lives on Porzellan Gasse; • in summer 1910 he leaves Mary in Ischl, goes to Café Pucher and sees Semski and Grabmayr, then takes the train with Major Laska; • frequent guest at the Stangeler country house, especially in 1911; • meets Rene in the stream in August 1911 after the snake encounter; • part of the group that drinks in Aug. 1911 in the country with Marchetti, Grabmayr, Geyrenhoff, von Langl, Lindner, Buschmann, etc.; • part of the hiking party the next day with Asta (who he wants to get with), Editha, and Rene; • has a brief crush on Editha in 1911; • after 1918, working for the state tobacco administration; • rides in the car with Eulenfeld and Editha (at that time Schlinger) in 1923; • is walking with Editha on the Graben when she and Ingrid cut each other, three days after the car ride in 1923; • met E.P. and Rosa in 1924; • in spring, 1925, he sees Editha at Eulenfeld's, and sees her a few times that year; • on the evening at Eulenfeld's, Melzer goes with Rene and Editha to the Strudlhof Steps; • in June, 1925, Mimi and Eulenfeld come to Melzer's; • Melzer writes a note to cancel a meeting with Editha (really Mimi); he gives the note to Thea who is going to see Editha on (July 10, 1925); • meets EP and Roserl at the Steps on Saturday, Aug 22, 1925, the day he spends by the bearskin from the Treskavica in his room on Porzellan Gasse; • Aug. 22 is the day he acquires a "civilian mentality"; • he goes out to Greifenstein to see Eulenfeld and meets Editha (really Mimi) on the train; she brings the cigarettes, he brings the coffee; he remembers Major Laska and how he died in Melzer's arms (Aug. 23, 1925); • he goes to the Strudlhof Steps and runs into Rene, then also Editha (really Mimi) and Eulenfeld (Aug. 24, 1925); • Editha (really Mimi) asks him to get her fountain pen repaired (Aug. 28, 1925); • he runs into Geyrenhoff, Marchetti, Konietzki, Langl, and von Lindner and they go to Café Pucher (Fri., Aug. 28, 1925); • he goes to the country and sees Asta at the post office, getting a letter from Herr Karl von W.; they go to the woods and talk about Etelka (Aug. 29, 1925); • at the dance in the country on Aug. 29, 1925; • has lunch with the Stangelers on Aug. 30 and notices that the father has gotten old; when he walks to the station with Asta and Etelka, it's the last time he sees her; • when he returns to Vienna on Sunday, Aug. 30, 1925, EP has put an electric candle in his room; • he goes for a walk with "Editha" and Eulenfeld; he later runs into Rene and they go to Melzer's place to drink coffee and smoke tobacco; they part at the Strudlhof Steps (Wed., Sept. 2, 1925); • Editha goes to Melzer's office to invite him for a drive on Saturday with Eulenfeld, then Thea shows up at the office to invite him for a get-together on Wed. Sept. 8 with Paula (Thurs., Sept. 3, 1925); • he goes for a drive with Eulenfeld, Editha, Negria, Angelika Scheichsbeutel, Kajetan and wife, Geyrenhoff, and others; he kisses Editha (Sat., Sept. 5, 1925); • he goes to the garden party with Alois and Paula Pichler, Thea Rokitzer, Theresa Schachl, Councillor Zihal; he officially meets Paula and Zihal for the first time, but remembers that he saw Paula on the Strudlhof Steps in 1911 (Wed., Sept. 9, 1925); • he meets Editha at the Strudlhof Steps (Thurs., Sept. 10, 1925); • he runs into Rene (Fri., Sept. 11, 1925); • Thea and Paula come over (Sat., Sept. 19, 1925); • he meets Rene on the Strudlhof Steps and learns that Etelka is dead; for this reason he ends up not meeting Paula and Thea on the Donaukanal; he was supposed to meet Editha as well, but on his way over he sees Mary K.'s accident; he rushes to assist her and finds that Thea is also there; they go to his place afterwards to clean up and he proposes to her (Mon., Sept. 21, 1925); • he sees Rene when they follow Etelka's coffin (Tues., Sept. 22, 1925); • Melzer and Thea go to the Pichlers and plan the engagement party (Thurs., Sept. 24, 1925); • Melzer and Thea visit Mary in the hospital (Sat., Sept. 26, 1925); • Melzer and Thea visit E.P. and Rosa (Sun., Sept. 27, 1925); • he goes to Editha's to get the twin show and confront her about the papers Thea gave him (Fri., Oct. 2, 1925); • Oct. 7 is the engagement party at the Schachls; • Melzer goes to the Strudelhof Steps one more time and marries Thea before winter; • after the ceremony they go visit Mark K in the hospital.

Embassy Councillor Stephan von Semski • Polish; • Editha and Ingrid were battling for him; • involved in the scandal with Ingrid Schmeller to which her dad takes offense in 1911.

Sectional Councillor Geyrenhoff (aka Georgie-Porgie) • friends with Marchetti; • wears the lavender cologne that Rene likes; • meets Rene in the stream in August 1911 after the snake encounter; • part of the group that drinks in Aug. 1911 in the country with Marchetti, Grabmayr, Melzer, von Langl, Lindner, Buschmann, etc.; • he randomly runs into Marchetti, Konietzki, Langl, von Lindner, and Melzer and they go to Café Pucher (Aug. 28, 1925); • he goes for a drive with Melzer, Editha, Negria, Angelika Scheichsbeutel, Kajetan and wife, Eulenfeld, and others (Sat., Sept. 5, 1925); • attends Melzer's wedding and chats with Zihal and Pichler.

Senior Councillor Julius Zihal • worked at the Central Bureau of Revenue and Tariff Computation; • lived in Theresa Schachl's house until he retired and got engaged in 1913; • then he was together with Rosa Oplatek; • had his portrait painted in 1923; • garden party with Alois and Paula Pichler, Thea Rokitzer, and Theresa Schachl; he meets Melzer for the first time (Wed., Sept. 9, 1925); • gives Thea away at Melzer's wedding and chats with Geyrenhoff and Pichler

Dr. Ferry Siebenschein • attorney; • lives below Mary and Oscar K.; • father of Grete and Titi Siebenschein; husband of Irma (hypochondriac).

Grete Siebenschein • black hair; graduate of music conservatory in Vienna; • older sister of Titi Siebenschein; • finds the Stangelers stuck up; • lives under Mary K. and teaches her piano; • was engaged to E.P. until summer of 1921 but didn't love him; • left E.P. after WWI to travel abroad to Norway; • played dance music in the resort hotel in Norway; • got with Rene in spring 1921 when she came back from Norway in May; then had a tumultuous relationship with Rene Stangeler that lasted over 3 yrs; • told Kajetan her Norway story 8 yrs after; • lives next to Dolly Storch; • 29 yrs old in late summer 1923; • Grete did not actually meet Etelka until June 1925 in Vienna; • in 1925 she goes to Paris with her sister Titi and Titi's husband, Cornel Lasch; she is 31; Scheichsbeutel is also there; • returns to Rene in Vienna on August 28, 1925 and they make love; • Rene goes to see Grete and they have a moment alone (Thurs., Sept. 3, 1925); • in the Lainzer Tiergarten with Rene (Wed., Sept. 9, 1925); • she is waiting for Rene to return from Budapest and goes to Mary K's (Mon., Sept. 21, 1925); • she and Rene go to Etelka's funeral (Tues., Sept. 22, 1925);

Rene Stangeler • 5th Stangeler child; • about the same age as Grete Siebenschein; • in prep school in 1911; • he takes a note to Grauermann from Etelka and hears the piano, then meets Paula for the first time, then is put on display at family dinner (May 12, 1911); • August 1911, the encounter with the snake; • hooks up with Editha while hiking with Asta and Melzer in Aug. 1911; she gives him a gold locket that he finds again on August 21, 1925; • meets Paula and Grauermann in the café on Aug. 23, 1911, and sees Etelka with Guys before they head to the Strudlhof Steps; • passed his Matura; • met E.P. in 1915 in the military; • completed military service and 4 yrs as prisoner of war; came home from POW camp in summer 1920 and went to the country house; • resumed his studies and started dating Grete in spring 1921; • meets Melzer and Editha at Eulenfeld's in spring 1925, for the first time since the Strudlhof Steps in 1911, and they go back there together; • spent some time with Etelka in Budapest, where he receives Grete's letters from Naples • he heads out to the country house and receives letters there from Grete (Aug. 4, 1925); • he is in Vienna waiting for Grete to return from Paris, is thinking about Editha and finds the locket she gave him in 1911, and then Eulenfeld calls to ask him to keep Editha (really Mimi) company the next day (Aug. 21, 1925); • he passes the Strudlhof Steps and visits Editha (really Mimi), where they hook up (Aug. 22, 1925); • he goes to the Strudlhof Steps and runs into Melzer, then also Editha (really Mimi)(Aug. 24, 1925); • he goes to the Westbahnhof to meet Grete Siebenschein, coming from Paris; he sees Paula Pichler and Lintschi who are coming to meet Thea Rokitzer; Rene thinks he sees Editha Schlinger coming from Salzburg, but then he sees them together and knows they are twins; his meeting with Grete that day is good and they make love (Aug. 28, 1925); • dinner at Grete's parents' house with Frau Siebenschein's sister Clarisse Markbreiter (Aug. 30, 1925); • he meets Paula at Café Brioni and then has tea with real Editha; they make love; he goes to see Grete briefly and kiss her; he runs into Melzer afterwards and they go to his place to drink coffee and smoke tobacco; they part at the Strudlhof Steps (Wed., Sept. 2, 1925). • Rene goes to see Grete and they have a moment alone (Thurs., Sept. 3, 1925); • in the Lainzer Tiergarten with Grete (Wed., Sept. 9, 1925); • he runs into Melzer (Fri., Sept. 11, 1925); • he is summoned to Budapest (Wed., Sept. 16, 1925); • His sister Etelka dies on Friday, Sept. 18, 1925; • he meets Melzer on the Strudlhof Steps and tells him that Etelka is dead (Mon., Sept. 21, 1925); • he sees Melzer when they follow Etelka's coffin (Tues., Sept. 22, 1925); • knew Kajetan by 1927 and jealous of Kajetan because Grete told him her Norway story.

Asta von Stangeler • 4th Stangeler child; • goes hiking with Melzer, Editha, and Rene in Aug. 1911; • sees Grauermann and Cornelia Wett having a tryst in the countryside on August 3, 1925; • marries Building Inspector Haupt; • at the dance in the country on Aug. 29, 1925; • Melzer is there for her at Etelka's funeral on Sept. 22.

Etelka Stangeler (aka Frau Consul Grauermann) • third Stangeler child; • educated in Dresden; • conflict with her father; • lives with Asta in the Quartier Latin of the Stangeler house; • was going to be engaged to Grauermann in 1910; • had a secret fling with Guys while with Grauermann when she was 24; • Rene sees her in a fiacre with Guys (Aug 23, 1911); • marries Grauermann in spring 1915; a bit older than Grauermann; • lives in Constantinople from about 1915-1919, then moves back to Vienna with Grauermann and their child; • moves to Budapest in 1923 with Grauermann; she cheats on him there; • Etelka and Pista host a dinner party that Honnegger attends, and she throws everyone out except Teddy; Pista says she is ill; • in August 1925 she is having an affair with Karl von W. in the countryside; she gets a letter from Fraunholzer (who is married) urging her to leave Grauermann for him; she also gets a love letter from Imre G.; • at the dance in the country on Aug. 29, 1925 • two turning points in her life: when she met Fraunholzer in Constantinople and in late summer 1925 when Fraunholzer gives up on her; • she commits suicide on Tues., Sept. 15, 1925, dies on Friday, the 18th; her body arrives in Vienna on the 22nd.

Herr von Stangeler • construction engineer for the railroad; • had 2 older daughters before Etelka, Asta, and Rene.

Chief Medical Councillor Schedik • doctor for Frau Siebenschein after 1927; • former father-in-law of Kajetan von S.

E.P. • lives at 44 Porzellan Gasse and is a neighbor of Melzer's; • was engaged to Grete; • met Rene in 1915 in the military; • introduced Grete to Rene, who she left him for; • got his job at the bank through Grete; • met wife Rosa in mortgage dept. of Land Title Bank; • married Rosa in 1924; • Melzer meets EP and Roserl at the Strudlhof Steps (Sat., Aug 22, 1925); • installs an electric candle in Melzer's room to surprise him (Aug. 31, 1925). • in the Lainzer Tiergarten with Rosa (Wed., Sept. 9, 1925); • Melzer and Thea visit E.P. and Rosa (Sun., Sept. 27, 1925).

Strudlhof Steps • built 1910, according to designs by Johann Theodor Jaeger and named after painter Peter Strudl; • in 1910, Mary and Oscar K. kiss here; • Rene comes here after hearing the music (May 12, 1911); • the Ingrid Schmeller and Semski meeting (plus Melzer, Asta, Rene, Paula, Grauermann, and Herr Schmeller)(Wed., Aug. 23, 1911); • in spring 1925, Melzer, Editha, and Rene go there after Eulenfeld's party • Rene goes there alone on his way to Editha's (Aug. 22, 1925); • Melzer meets EP and Roserl there, and finds out that E.P. knew Rene (Sat., Aug. 22, 1925); • Melzer goes to the Strudlhof Steps and runs into Rene, where they talk about the origin of the Steps; Editha (really Mimi) also shows up (Aug. 24, 1925); • Rene and Melzer part ways here after hanging out and waxing nostalgic on times past (Wed., Sept. 2, 1925); • Editha meets Melzer at the Strudlhof Steps (Thurs., Sept. 10, 1925); • Melzer goes to the steps alone (Sun., Sept. 20, 1925); • Rene meets Melzer on the Strudlhof Steps and tells him that Etelka is dead (Mon., Sept. 21, 1925); • Melzer and Thea meet here when going to visit Mary in the hospital; • Melzer goes to the Strudlhof Steps one more time at the end.

Editha Pastre (aka Frau Schlinger, Frau Gustav Wedderkopp) • divorced twice, first from Schlinger, then from Wedderkopp; parents are Swiss; had a twin who ran away (Mimi); Calvinist family; family is from Geneva; mother is Pastre-Meriot; • hooks up with Rene while hiking with Asta and Melzer in Aug. 1911; • passes Melzer on the tennis court wearing the white dress in 1911; • the one who discovers Herr Semski and Ingrid Schmeller kissing in the bathroom in 1911, though she was also trying to get with him; • she has an affair with Ingrid's dad, Herr Schmeller; • the one who meets Negria in the café when he's waiting for Mary, on the same day she and Ingrid cut each other on the Graben in 1923; • Editha visits Mimi in Buenos Aires from Nov. 1923 to March 1924; she convinces Enrique that Mimi should come to Vienna to meet with her parents and secure her inheritance; • Thea becomes her protégée in 1923-25; • hangs out with Eulenfeld's crew in 1925; • in spring, 1925, she sees Melzer at Eulenfeld's; goes to the Strudlhof Steps with Rene and Melzer in 1925; • Editha falls in love with a cigar dealer from Wiesbaden, Germany, Herr Wedderkopp, who wants Austrian cigarettes; Editha plans to get the cigarettes from Fräulein Oplatek and use Mimi to smuggle them to Germany; • she goes to Salzburg as Mimi for the summer and returns on Aug. 28, 1925 to Vienna; Mimi picks her up at the Westbahnhof and they are seen by Rene and Paula; • she meets with Mimi and Eulenfeld to discuss the cigarette scheme and is upset that Mimi didn't make more headway with Melzer, who works in the tobacco administration; they plot on how to confuse Melzer and Rene about the duplicity; Mimi talks about growing up as Editha's twin; • she goes to Melzer's office to invite him for a drive on Saturday with Eulenfeld and steals some papers (Thurs., Sept. 3, 1925); • she goes for a drive with Melzer, Eulenfeld, Negria, Angelika Scheichsbeutel, Kajetan and wife, Geyrenhoff, and others; she kisses Melzer (Sat., Sept. 5, 1925); • she meets Melzer at the Strudlhof Steps (Thurs., Sept. 10, 1925); • she is with Eulenfeld and Mimi and is telling him about her plans to marry Gustav Wedderkopp; they are planning to reveal the twins to Melzer, but Thea comes instead; the authorities come with a warrant to search Eulenfeld and Editha's apartments concerning the tobacco scheme; luckily, Thea just pocketed the papers with the official signatures (Monday, Sept. 21, 1925). • Eulenfeld, Mimi, and Editha reveal the twin escapade to Melzer (Oct. 2, 1925); • in the end she meets with her parents and Mimi, marries Gustav Wedderkopp, and attends Melzer's wedding.

Ingrid Schmeller (aka Frau von Budau) • gets caught kissing Semski on Tuesday, Aug 22, 1911, the day of the Schmellers' garden party in Döbling, Vienna; Ingrid and Semski were hooking up in the bathroom; Editha discovered them; Herr Schmeller shows up and they have a confrontation on the stairs; the next day Ingrid is with Asta in the Quartier Latin; Melzer, Asta, and Ingrid go to the Consular Academy to find Honnegger, who helps them get in touch with Semski so Ingrid can say goodbye to him; Herr Schmeller shows up; • Melzer is walking with Editha on the Graben when she and Ingrid cut each other, in 1923; • in 1925, Editha and Eulenfeld are out in Vienna and Ingrid, now Frau von Budau, cuts Editha again (or is it Mimi?)

Herr Benno von Grabmayr • from Tirol; • sees Melzer at Café Pucher in 1910; • goes to the Stangeler country house; part of the group that drinks in Aug. 1911 in the country with Marchetti, Geyrenhoff, Melzer, von Langl, Lindner, Buschmann, etc.; • died in Serbia in the war.

Vice Consul Stephan Grauermann (aka Pista) • Hungarian; friends with Honnegger; • was going to be engaged to Etelka in 1910; • he runs into Rene and Paula in the café (Aug. 23, 1911); • dispatched to Constantinople around 1913; • marries Etelka in spring 1915; • transitions to private industry between 1920-1923; then they move to Budapest; • Etelka cheats on him in Budapest; • Etelka and Pista host a dinner party that Honnegger attends, and she throws everyone out except Teddy; Pista says she is ill; • in August 1925, Grauermann wants to have an affair with Cornelia Wett in the countryside; • his wife Etelka commits suicide in Budapest on Tues., Sept. 15, 1925, and dies on the 18th.

Marchetti • goes to the Stangeler country house in 1910; • part of the group that drinks in Aug. 1911 in the country with Geyrenhoff, Grabmayr, Melzer, von Langl, Lindner, Buschmann, etc.; • he goes to Café Pucher with Geyrenhoff, Konietzki, Langl, von Lindner, and Melzer (Aug. 28, 1925); • attends Melzer's wedding.

Teddy von Honnegger • hangs out with Semski in Café Pucher; • 2 yrs older than Grauermann; childhood friend of Fraunholzer; • plays the piano on May 12, 1911, when Rene and Grauermann hear him; • Etelka and Pista host a dinner party in Budapest that Honnegger attends, and she throws everyone out except Teddy; Pista says she is ill; • in summer 1925 he runs into Fraunholzer in Budapest and tells him Etelka has been consorting with Imre von G.; • he is present at Etelka's death in Budapest in Sept. 1925.

Edouard von Langl (aka the master of light piano music) • part of the Grauermann, Marchetti, Semski, Grabmayr crew in 1910; • part of the group that drinks in Aug. 1911 in the country with Marchetti, Grabmayr, Melzer, Geyrenhoff, Lindner, Buschman, etc.; • he thinks he sees Editha in Salzburg (Aug. 24, 1925); • he goes to Café Pucher with Geyrenhoff, Konietzki, Marchetti, von Lindner, and Melzer; he tells them he saw Editha Schlinger in Salzburg on Monday (Aug. 28, 1925); • attends Melzer's wedding.

Major Laska (later Colonel) • Melzer's mentor; they go on the bear hunt together; he dies in Melzer's arms on the battlefield.

Lovis Konietzki • he goes to Café Pucher with Geyrenhoff, Marchetti, Langl, von Lindner, and Melzer (Aug. 28, 1925).

Paula Schachl (aka Paula Pichler) • dark red hair; worked for the attorney; lived with her aunt, Theresa (Resi) Schachl; 8 yrs. older than Thea; • meets Rene on May 12, 1911 in front of the Blue Unicorn, when she's 18; • meets Rene and Grauermann in the café before they go to the Strudlhof Steps (Aug. 23, 1911); • meets Thea Rokitzer through the Schachl/Zihal connection in early summer 1923; • married a foreman at the govt. printing office (Alois Pichler); • sees Rene in 1925; • Thea tells her about being slapped by Editha (really Mimi)(July 18, 1925); • she goes to the Westbahnhof to meet Thea Rokitzer with Lintschi; they see Rene there and she also sees Editha with Mimi (Aug. 28, 1925); • she meets with Thea and doesn't tell her about Editha and Mimi (Aug. 31, 1925); • she meets with Rene and remembers she's in love with him; she wants Rene to tell Melzer about Editha but he refuses (Sept. 2, 1925); • garden party with her husband Alois Pichler, Theresa Schachl, Thea Rokitzer, Councillor Zihal, Melzer; she and Melzer remember that they saw each other on the Strudlhof Steps in 1911 (Wed., Sept. 9, 1925); • she and Thea go to Melzer's (Sat., Sept. 19, 1925); • she and Thea wait for Melzer by the Donau but he doesn't come (Mon., Sept. 21, 1925); • Melzer and Thea go to the Pichlers and plan the engagement party (Thurs., Sept. 24, 1925); • attends Melzer's wedding, where her husband chats with Zihal and Geyrenhoff.

Government Councillor Emile Guys • Swiss; married with 2 kids; • sits next to Etelka at dinner on May 12, 1911 and has an affair with her; • Rene sees him in a fiacre with Etelka (Aug. 23, 1911);

Consul Robby Fraunholzer (aka Pompeius) • older colleague of Grauermann; 10 yrs older than Etelka; • posted to Constantinople in 1910 and married Fräulein Lea "Mädi" Küffer; their 3 kids would later play with Mary K's kids; • meets Etelka when she gets off the train in Constantinople in 1915 and then follow 3 years of undeclared love; • had pneumonia in 1919 and was ordered to gain weight; • in 1920 he lives in Gmunden with his family, before moving to Belgrade without the family to handle business for an Austrian firm; • in August 1925, he writes to Etelka urging her to leave Grauermann for him; he also writes to Asta asking about Etelka; • after receiving Asta's letter, he takes the train from Belgrade to Budapest and thinks about his wife; • in Budapest, he runs into Honnegger, who tells him that Etelka has been consorting with Imre von G; • shows up unexpectedly at the dance in the country on Aug. 29, 1925, where Etelka is with Karl von W.; he realizes it won't work with Etelka and goes back to his wife in Gmunden; • he stays in Gmunden from Aug. 31 to Sept. 10, 1925, then goes to Belgrade; • on Sat., Sept. 19, 1925, he arrives in Budapest after Etelka's death.

Cornelia Wett • member of the Vienna State Opera • 1921-1922 friends with Etelka and Fraunholzer; • in August 1925, Grauermann wants to have an affair with her in the countryside.

Thea Rokitzer • resembles Lintschi; her father is the brother-in-law of Rosa Zihal; • meets Paula Pichler through the Schachl/Zihal connection in early summer 1923; • becomes Editha's protégée in connection with Eulenfeld; dates Eulenfeld in 1923-25; • spends half a July afternoon with Melzer while waiting for Eulenfeld; • she witnesses Melzer in a quandary; he doesn't want to mail the note to Editha so he asks her to deliver it; she doesn't get it there that day because she runs into Eulenfeld and Rene who may have been coming from drinking at Editha's (July 10, 1925); • Eulenfeld asks Thea to take Editha's passport to the post office to pick up a letter; instead of taking it back to him she goes to Editha (who is really Mimi), and she also has the letter from Melzer to Editha, but she doesn't give it to her; Mimi slaps her because of the passport (July 11, 1925); • she tells Paula about the slapping event and they read Melzer's note to Editha (July 18, 1925); • in July 1925, Eulenfeld tries to get some tobacco products from Thea's aunt and gets upset when she botches the request; • Thea then goes to St. Valentin with her aunt Rosa Zihal; • Thea returns to Vienna and meets Paula and Aunt Lina on the platform; this is when Paula and Rene see Editha and Mimi (Aug. 28, 1925); • Thea has an unsuccessful audition for a movie talent agency; Hedi accosts her about the cigarette scheme and Eulenfeld; she goes to Eulenfeld's house (Sat., Aug. 29, 1925); • garden party with the Pichlers (Alois and Paula), Theresa Schachl, Councillor Zihal, and Melzer (Wed., Sept. 9, 1925); • she and Paula go to Melzer's (Sat., Sept. 19, 1925); • she and Paula wait for Melzer by the Donau but he doesn't come; she goes to Editha's; while she is waiting, she steals some papers with Melzer's name on them from Editha's desk; she freaks out when she sees the twins and runs away, just in time to see Mary K get hit; she helps Melzer administer first aid; they go to his place afterwards to clean up and he proposes to her (Mon., Sept. 21, 1925); • Melzer and Thea go to the Pichlers and plan the engagement party (Thurs., Sept. 24, 1925); • Melzer and Thea visit Mary in the hospital (Sat., Sept. 26, 1925); • Melzer and Thea visit E.P. and Rosa (Sun., Sept. 27, 1925); • Oct. 7 is the engagement party at the Schachls; • she marries Melzer before winter in Liechtental; after the ceremony they go visit Mark K in the hospital.

Lina Nohel (aka Lintschi) • Frau von Stangeler's maid for 27 yrs.; Paula Schachl thinks of her as an aunt; • she goes to the Westbahnhof to meet Thea Rokitzer with Paula; they see Rene there and she also sees Editha with Mimi (Aug. 28, 1925).

Dolly Storch • dates Oki Leucht in 1925; • neighbor of the Siebenscheins'; • tells E.P. about Rene's falling out with Grete; • attends parties at Eulenfeld's.

Oki Leucht • is the man lying on the rug at Editha's feet at Eulenfeld's place in 1925; • dates Dolly Storch in 1925; • close friends with Scheichsbeutel; • he was just about to deliver some tobacco goods to Editha, but he saw the authorities going to her apartment so he left (Mon., Sept. 21, 1925).

Scheichsbeutel • manservant to Cornel Lasch; friends with Leucht; this family lives next door to the Stangelers; large-scale black marketeer; his younger daughter is Angely de Ly; • in Paris in summer 1925 with Titi, Grete, and Lasch; • he arranged to have Oki Leucht deliver some tobacco products to Editha, but luckily the mission was timely aborted (Mon., Sept. 21, 1925).

Cornel Lasch • husband of Titi Siebenschein; • in Paris in summer 1925 with Titi, Grete, and Scheichsbeutel.

Mimi Pastre (aka Mimi Scarlez) • Editha's twin; when they were younger they would often impersonate each other; she ran away to Argentina with Enrique Scarlez in 1908 because she hated being Editha's double; • had an appendectomy in 1923; • 17 yrs late, in summer 1925, she pretends to be Editha in Vienna while Editha is in Salzburg; • Captain Eulenfeld knew her in Argentina and was there 4 yrs ago; • on July 11, 1925, she slaps Thea for bringing her the passport and letter; • in 1925 she and Eulenfeld are out in Vienna and Ingrid, now Frau von Budau, cuts her (as Editha) again; • she runs into Konietzki but doesn't recognize him (Aug. 17, 1925); • Rene comes to visit her and they make love (thinking it's Editha)(Aug. 22, 1925); • she rides with Melzer on the train to Greifenstein to see Eulenfeld; she brings the cigarettes, he brings the coffee; she asks him about Ingrid who is now married, Frau von Budau (Aug. 23, 1925); • she runs into Rene and Melzer at the Strudlhof Steps and invites them back to her place, where the captain also comes (Aug. 24, 1925); • she is with Eulenfeld and Editha; they are planning to reveal the twins to Melzer, but Thea comes instead (Mon., Sept. 21, 1925); • Eulenfeld, Mimi, and Editha reveal the twin escapade to Melzer (Oct. 2, 1925); • in the end she meets with her parents and her husband comes to Vienna; • attends Melzer's wedding.

Building Inspector Haupt • marries Asta von Stangeler; • runs into Rene on Aug 29, 1925; • at Etelka's funeral on Sept. 22, Melzer remembers that he knows Baurat Haupt.

Angely de Ly (aka Angelika Scheichsbeutel) • daughter of Scheichsbeutel, celebrity dancer; • Dr. Negria is her protector/physician/uncle?; • at the dance in the country on Aug. 29, 1925; • she goes for a drive with Melzer, Editha, Negria, Eulenfeld, Kajetan and wife, Geyrenhoff, and others (Sat., Sept. 5, 1925).

Karl von W. • having an affair with Etelka in summer 1925; ugly son of a minister; • at the dance in the country on Aug. 29, 1925.

Hedwig Loiskandl (aka Hedi) • Paula Pichler's 18 yr old stepsister; • she visits Thea R., asking about Eulenfeld and the cigarette scheme (Aug. 29, 2025).

Josephine Oplatek • Aunt of Hedwig Loiskandl; • In July 1925, Mimi and Eulenfeld approach her about the cigarette scheme because she is a tobacconist.

== Publication ==
Biederstein Verlag in Munich published the original, 908 pages long German-language edition of The Strudlhof Steps in 1951. C. H. Beck published an edition in 2013 with an essay by Stefan Winterstein about the novel's topography and an afterword by Daniel Kehlmann. Translations were published in Italian in 1965, Polish in 1979, Spanish in 1981, Bulgarian in 1984, Slovak in 1990, Slovenian and Hungarian in 1994, Estonian and Dutch in 2008 and Croatian in 2013–2014. New York Review Books published the English translation by Vincent Kling on 7 September 2021.

== Reception ==
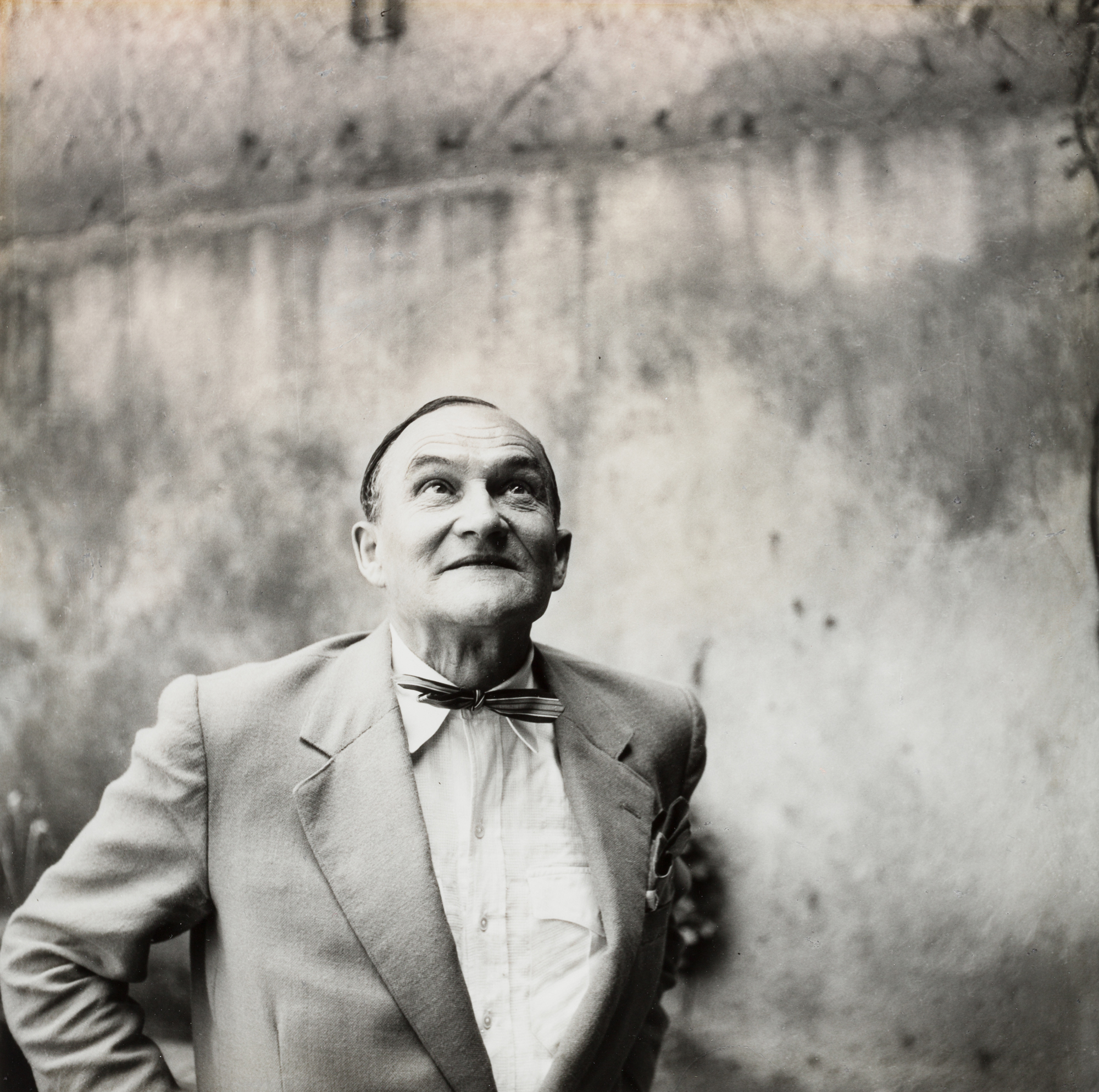
Doderer in 1959

The Strudlhof Steps was a major critical success in German-speaking Europe when it first appeared. It turned Doderer into one of Austria's most prominent writers. According to Barbara Petsch of Die Presse, the way the novel portrays a resilient Austrian identity managed to provide comfort in post-war Austria.

In 2013, Helmut Böttiger of Deutschlandfunk wrote that the novel has retained a feeling of being fresh and timeless. He wrote that its appeal lies in how Doderer offers "a perpetual meandering and circling" which creates "an approximation that becomes ever denser and more concrete". Böttiger wrote that The Strudlhof Steps portrays a seemingly endless summer and is a novel where the location and language are more important than the actions of the individual characters. According to Böttiger, this "suprapersonal" narrative mode is a key to the sense of timelessness, because it allows the novel to connect its time levels—the pre-war imperial Austria-Hungary, the republican Austrian rump state of the 1920s, and, through occasional evocations of the author, the immediate post-war period when the book was written—with almost no apparent disruption from the wars and political shifts.

When The Strudlhof Steps was published in English in 2021, David Dollenmayer wrote that Doderer is "among the great novelists of the twentieth century" and called The Strudlhof Steps his masterpiece. He wrote that it differs significantly from The Magic Mountain, The Man Without Qualities and Radetzky March, which portray a development toward the disaster of war, by instead being about the recovery of memories and human dignity on the other side of a war. Dollenmayer wrote that translating The Strudlhof Steps comes with many challenges, to which Kling's English translation contains many "brilliant solutions". Ritchie Robertson wrote that the novel has won devotees thanks to the atmosphere it creates with short, lyrical passages, but also contains detailed character descriptions and a "wholly individual style" that remains pleasurable even at times when it is too verbose. Francine Prose wrote that Doderer uses a level of detail and other elements associated with 19th-century novels, but these "are scrambled by his modernist disregard for the conventions of chronology, introduction, and explanation". Kirkus Reviews called The Strudlhof Steps "both neurasthenic and darkly humorous" and wrote that it "ably captures a lost world". The critic wrote that it contains "a few uncomfortable passages" where Doderer describes foreigners with "a sometimes-disapproving fascination".

The English translation received the 2022 Helen and Kurt Wolff Translator's Prize.

== Legacy ==
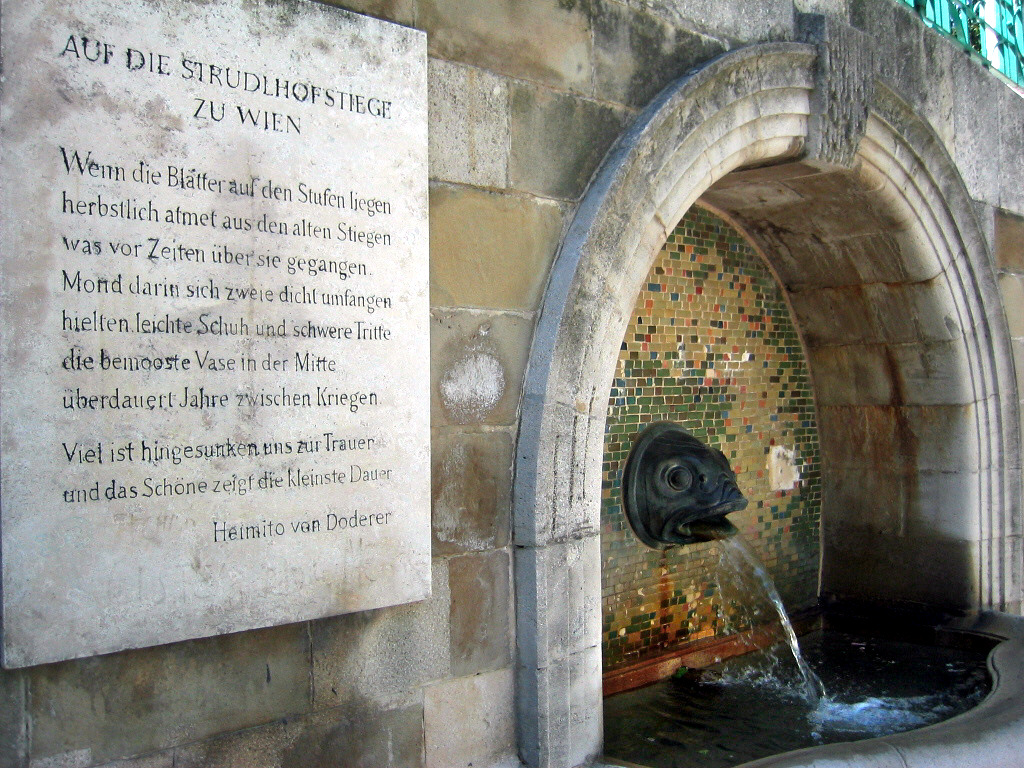
Plaque with Doderer's poem at the Strudelhofstiege

A plaque with Doderer's poem "Auf die Strudelhofstiege zu Wien" (lit. 'On the Strudlhof Steps in Vienna'), which opens the novel, has been placed at the Strudlhofstiege.

In 1956, Doderer published The Demons, which is an even longer novel about a large cast of characters in Vienna, set a few years after The Strudlhof Steps. Together with The Lighted Windows, these novels give a detailed panorama of Vienna's social life in the years before and after the fall of the Austrian monarchy. They are sometimes referred to as the Vienna novels.

The Strudlhof Steps was the basis for the two-part Austrian television film Melzer oder Die Tiefe der Jahre. It was directed by Georg Madeja and made for the ORF in 1987.
