= Wilhelm Heinrich Schüßler =

German homeopath (1821–1898)

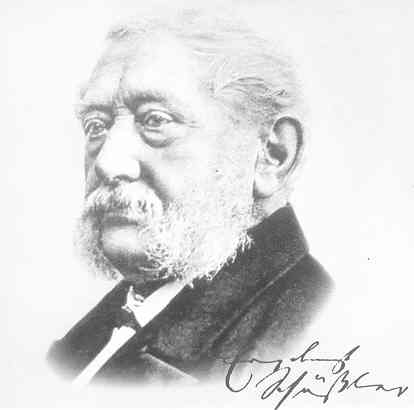
- Born: 21 August 1821
- Died: 30 March 1898 (aged 76)
- Occupations: Medical doctor and naturopath
- Known for: Biochemic cell salt research

Wilhelm Heinrich Schüßler (also spelled Schuessler; 21 August 1821 – 30 March 1898) was a German medical doctor in Oldenburg who searched for natural remedies and published the results of his experiments in a German homeopathic journal in March 1873, leading to a list of 12 so-called "biochemic cell salts" that remain popular in alternative medicine. Although he was firmly within the homeopathy movement of his day, the modern definition of homeopathy tends to exclude his concept of homeopathic potency, which favored remedies which, while very dilute, still retained small amounts of the original salt.

== Influences and history ==
Samuel Hahnemann had proposed homeopathy in 1796, based on the idea of using very dilute remedies including salts. An 1832 paper in Stapf's Archiv suggested such salts would be "essential component parts of the human body". Schüßler was influenced by an 1852 paper by the Dutch physiologist Jacob Moleschott (1812–1893). Serious discussion began only after Dr Lorbacher of Leipzig critically considered his ideas five months later. An English translation appeared in the Medical Investigator in May 1873, then in "The Twelve Tissue Remedies" by Dr C. Hering, and in 1888 in a book of the same name by Boericke and Dewey, two medical doctors in San Francisco.

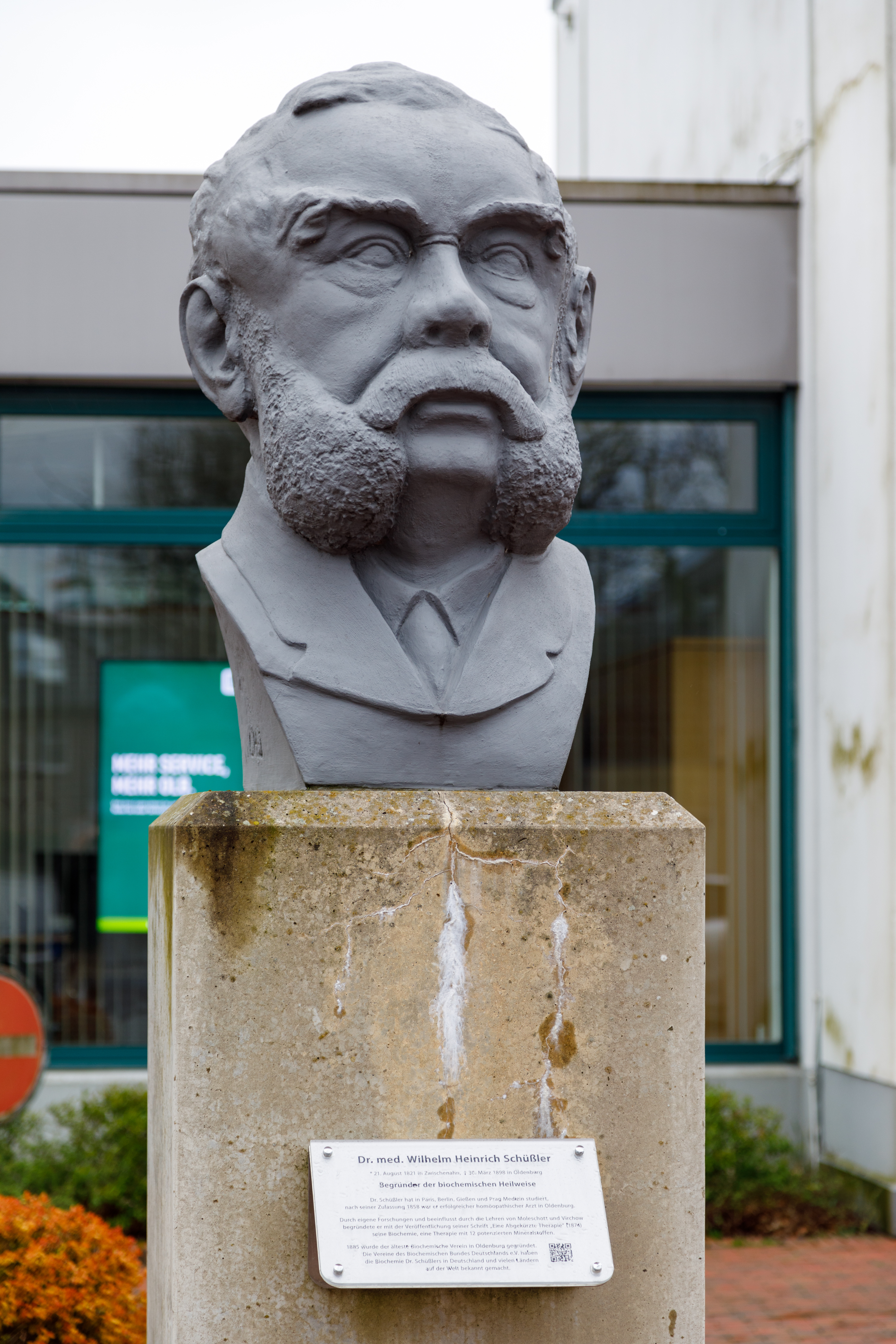
Memorial in Bad Zwischenahn

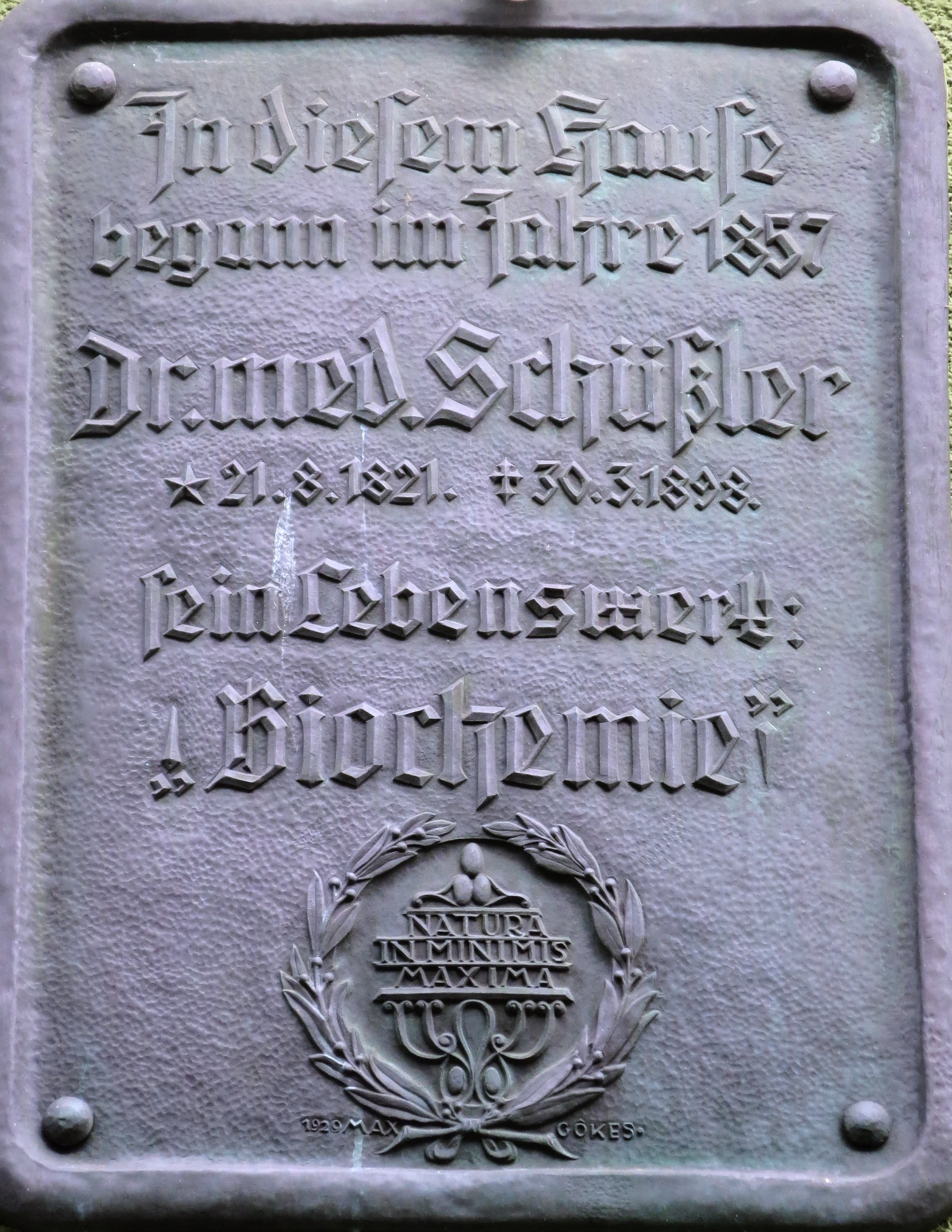
Memorial plaque in Oldenburg

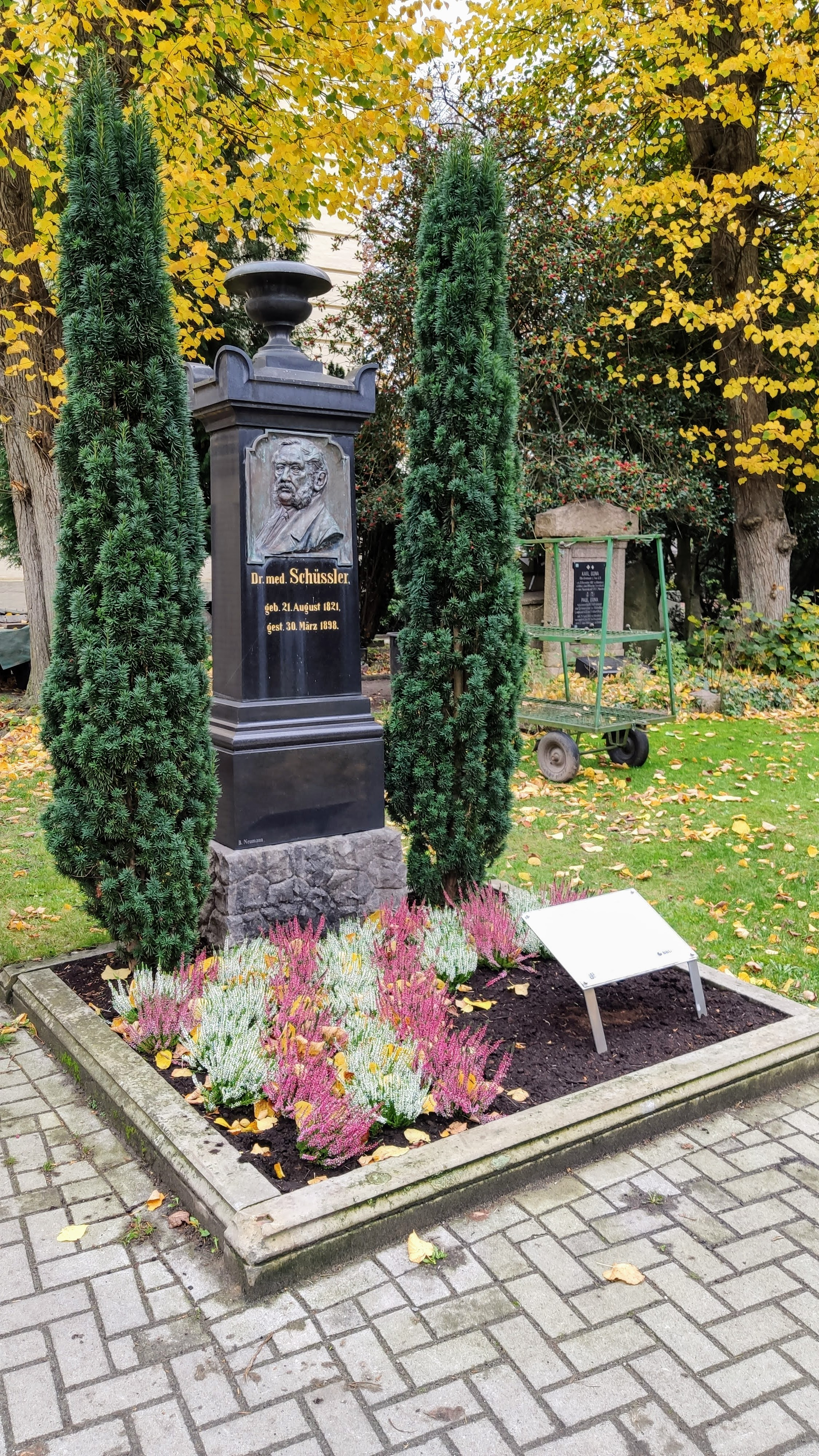
Grave in Oldenburg at the Gertrudenkirchhof

Around the beginning of the twentieth century, Eli Jones and other doctors studied Schüßler's ideas and derived new ones; by the end of that century Schüßler's name (in various forms of spelling) and list of twelve "tissue salts" were commonly found in health shops and alternative medicine books.

Schuessler salts are discussed in Western Australia's Government Gazette of 12 April 1946:

THE following report is issued under section 210 of the Health Act, 1911–1944:- It is claimed that the above "remedy" [Dr. Schuessler's Cell Salts, Kali Phos. 3X] is "indicated in loss of mental power, brain fog, paralysis of any part, nervous headaches, neuralgic pains, general disability and exhaustion and sleeplessness from nervous disorders." The "remedy" has been analysed and been found to contain potassium dihydrogen phosphate and lactose. The actual quantity of potassium dihydrogen phosphate in the "adult dose" is so minute that over 9,000 tablets would be necessary to give the minimum medicinal dose of this drug. Lactose is a sugar which is of no value in the treatment of any of the above-mentioned maladies. Dr. Schuessler's Cell Salts can therefore have no curative value. They will bring about no improvement in any of the illnesses for which they are said to be indicated. Any expenditure on the purchase of these salts will be money wasted

— C. E. COOK, Commissioner of Public Health

== Works ==
- Eine abgekürzte Therapie: Anleitung zur biochemischen Behandlung der Krankheiten. Schulze, Oldenburg 42nd ed. 1917 Digital edition by the University and State Library Düsseldorf

== See also ==
- George W. Carey
