= William Boericke =

Austrian-American physician and ardent

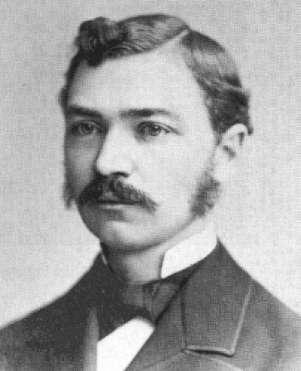
William Boericke

William G. Boericke (25 October 1849 in Asch, Bohemia Austrian Empire – 1 April 1929 in San Francisco) was an Austrian-born American physician and ardent, influential exponent of homeopathy. He is known in the field today as the compiler and editor of the Pocket Manual of Homeopathic Materia Medica. The ninth edition has endured as his most re-published version partly because of its then final inclusion of a mini-repertory (Note: Repertory: noun; in homeopathy, repertory is an extensive reference book or computer program that lists and cross-references precise symptoms and remedies for those symptoms. (Mosby's Dictionary of Complementary and Alternative Medicine, Wayne B Jonas (ed.), Elsevier (2005); OCLC 436845773)) by his brother, Oscar Eugene Boericke, MD, (Note: Oscar Eugene Boericke, MD (1872–1958), a homeopathic physician, was a half-brother of William Boericke, having the same father, Franz Oskar Boericke (1813–1901)) also a homeopathic physician.

== Early life ==
As a child, William Boericke immigrated to the United States with his family from Asch, then part of the Austrian Empire, a Bohemian region that, since the end of World War II, was part of Czechoslovakia, then, since 1993, the Czech Republic. The Boerickes settled in Cleveland.

William Boericke's father, Franz Oskar Boericke (1813–1901), married twice, his second being to Henriette C. née Jaenig (1836–1902), William Boericke's stepmother.

== Medical journal ==
Boericke was the founding editor in November 1882 of the journal, The California Homeopath. The first five volumes were published bi-monthly. Willis Alonzo Dewey, MD (1858–1938) became co-editor with volume six. Charles Lewis Tisdale, MD (1859–1925), was added as editor with volume eight. With volume nine in 1892, the name changed to The Pacific Coast Journal of Homeopathy under a new editor, Hugo Emil Rudolph Arndt (1849–1913). Boericke was editor again from 1910 to 1915 and from 1918 to 1922. The journal ran until 1940, closing under the editorship of one of Boericke's sons, Charles Caleb Boericke, MD (1897–1965). The publication had been the official organ of the state homeopathic medical societies of California, Oregon, and Washington.

== Hospital and medical college in Northern California ==
Boericke co-founded the Pacific Homeopathic Medical College and Hahnemann Hospital in 1881. In 1883, Boericke was a co-incorporator and founding faculty member of the Hahnemann Medical College of San Francisco, graduating its first class in October 1884. The Hahnemann Medical College of the Pacific was absorbed by the University of California, San Francisco, Medical School in July 1918. That same year, the University appointed Boericke as its first homeopathic lecturer, a position he had held from 1883, at the original college, to 1922, at UCSF. Instruction in homeopathy continued at UCSF until 1939, when the school dropped it from the curriculum.

== Boericke & Tafel ==
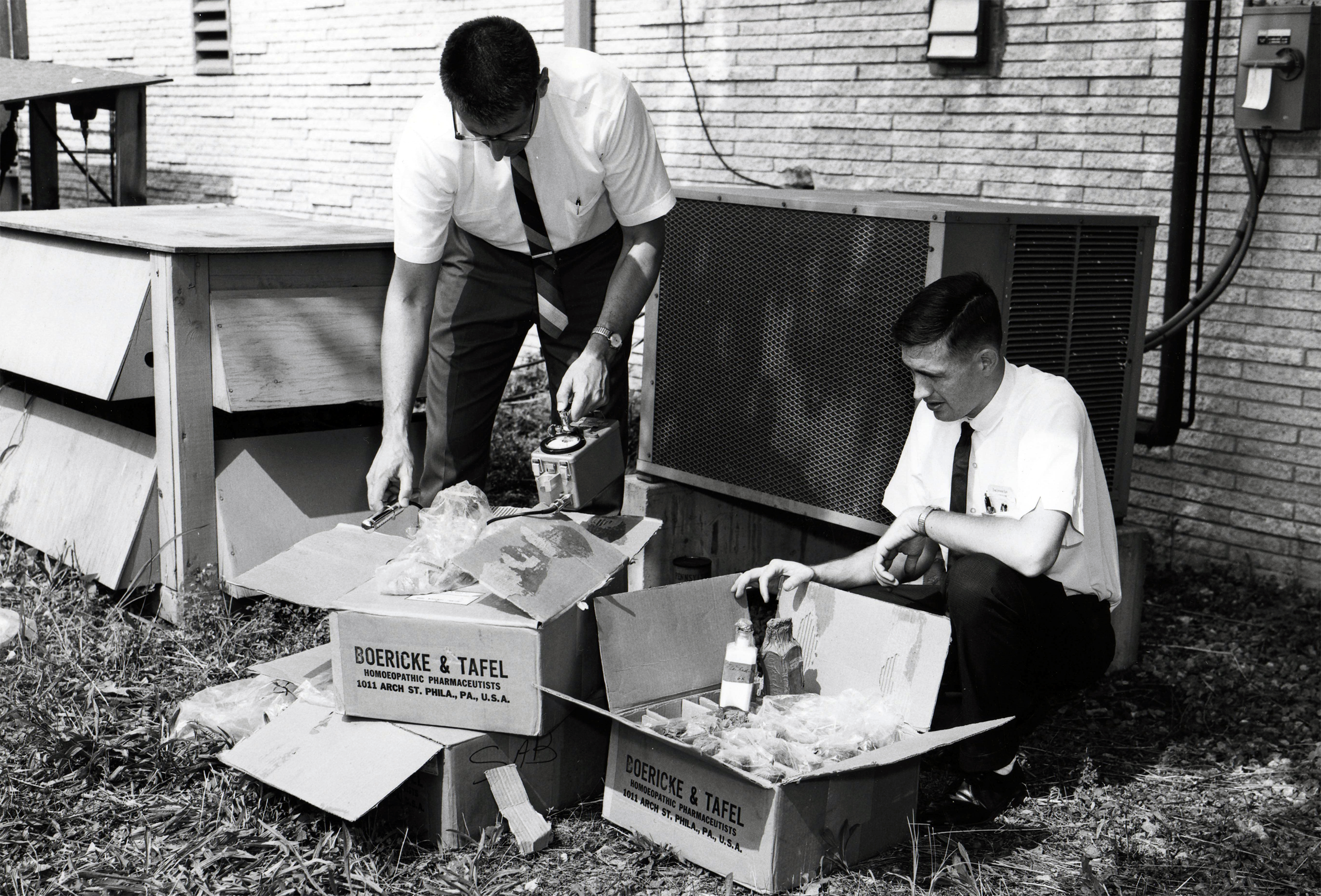
FDA inspectors go through a collection of homeopathic drugs from long-time manufacturer Boericke & Tafel. The Homeopathic Pharmacopoeia of the United States became an official compendium under the 1938 Food, Drug, and Cosmetic Act.

In 1853, William Boericke's uncle, Francis Edmund Boericke (1826–1901), and Rudolph Leonhard Tafel (1831–1896) founded a bookstore specializing in Swedenborgian literature, at 24 South 5th Street in Philadelphia. Upon the suggestion of Constantine Hering, they began to manufacture and sell homeopathic remedies. Within six months of the formation of the partnership, Rudolph Tafel left to assume a teaching position at the U.S. Naval Academy. That same year (1854), Francis Boericke married Rudolph Tafel's sister, Eliza Mathilda Tafel (1838–1904). Francis Boericke kept the small book store, and took in Rudolph's brother, Adolph Julius Tafel (1839–1995), as an apprentice. In 1855, Adolph Tafel left for the West. In 1863, Francis Boericke earned a medical degree from the Homeopathic Medical College of Pennsylvania. In 1869, he formed a partnership with Adolph Tafel, Boericke & Tafel, a publishing company, homeopathic medicine wholesaler, retailer, and manufacturer, in Philadelphia, headquartered at Fifth Street, above Chestnut.

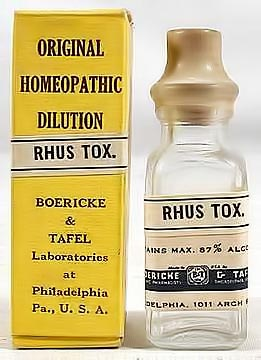
Homeopathic remedy Rhus toxicodendron, derived from poison ivy.

When William Boericke graduated from public high school in Cincinnati in 1863, he moved to Philadelphia to work for the Boericke pharmacy. In 1870, Boericke & Tafel opened a branch in San Francisco called "Pioneer Homeopathic Pharmacy", located at 234 Sutter Street. William Boericke ran it from its inception. In 1876, William Boericke moved back to Philadelphia to attend Hahnemann Medical College, where he graduated with an MD in 1880. He then studied at the Vienna Medical School for one year.

== Boericke & Schreck ==
In 1882, William Boericke moved back to San Francisco to practice medicine and, in the spring of that same year, he and Ernest Albert Schreck (1831–1886) purchased the Pioneer Homeopathic Pharmacy and henceforth named it Boericke & Schreck.

== Boericke and Runyon Company ==
Schreck died in 1886. In October 1890, Edward Wheelock Runyon (1851–1937) purchased Schreck's half interest and the firm henceforth, until 1950, was known as "Boericke and Runyon". Around 1894, Boericke and Runyon took on another partner, Frederick O. Ernesty (1951–1959) and the firm became known as Boericke, Runyan & Ernesty. Ernesty sold his interest to Boericke and Runyon in 1899 and retired. Around 1920, Boericke and Runyon began producing popular non-prescription home-remedy medicines under the tradename EOPA, the middle four alpha characters from the word "Hom-eopa-thy". EOPA eventually became a subsidiary of Boericke and Runyon – Eopa Company – and distributed medicines nationwide. The Eopa Company operated nationally until the early 1950s.

In 1877, Boericke & Tafel opened a pharmacy in Oakland at the Grand Central Hotel at 956 Broadway. They suspended operations in 1882, selling it to William Adelbert Brueck, a homeopathic pharmacist who had been their manager. In 1886, Brueck sold it to Boericke and Schreck.

== Legacy ==
When William Boericke died in 1929, approximately three-fourths of the stock in Boericke & Tafel descended to his four surviving sons: (i) Garth Wilkinson Boericke, MD (1893–1968), (ii) William Fay Boericke (1885–1963), (iii) Charles Caleb Boericke, MD (1897–1965), (iv) Arthur Thacher Boericke (1899–1972).

Before the end of the 19th century, Boericke & Tafel, headquartered in Philadelphia, became the largest manufacturer of homeopathic medicines in the United States. In 1987, Boericke & Tafel was acquired by VSM (nl) (Voorhoeve Schwabe Merkgeneesmiddelen) of the Netherlands, a subsidiary of the Willmar Schwabe Group (de) of Germany. In 1992, Boericke & Tafel moved to Santa Rosa, California. In 2005, Schwabe Pharmaceuticals closed its Santa Rosa manufacturing facilities and moved its marketing and distribution departments to a sister company, Nature's Way, in Utah, and its manufacturing to the Netherlands and Mexico, where Schwabe, at that time, had facilities that were underused. Boericke and Runyon Company was eventually, sometime after 1950, acquired by Boericke & Tafel.

Boericke, who was known internationally in the field of homeopathy, flourished in several dimensions of homeopathy during its rise in the United States. He was a popular clinical physician, prolific academic writer, publisher, medical journal editor, owner of several pharmacies, medicine manufacturer, medical school professor, and published researcher.

To the extent that homeopathy had been, and still is, criticized by the mainstream medical community in North America, Boericke's era of homeopathy, and Boericke in particular, was highly transparent and well-published. Boericke was also well-known and influential in Europe, particularly Germany – the birthplace of homeopathy, whose people spoke the language of Boericke's childhood.

At the end of the 19th century, there was hardly a U.S. city with over 50,000 people that didn't have a homeopathic hospital. In 1890, there were 93 regular medical schools, of which 14 were exclusively homeopathic and 8 were eclectic. In 1900, there were 121 regular medical schools, of which 22 were exclusively homeopathic, and 10 were eclectic. Also in 1900, there were more than 100 homeopathic hospitals, over 60 homeopathic orphan asylums and old people's homes, and over 1,000 homeopathic pharmacies.

Teaching of homeopathy in the United States declined rapidly in the early 20th century. The last purely homeopathic medical school closed in 1920, although homeopathic electives continued to be offered by the Hahnemann Medical School in Philadelphia until the 1940s. Criticism in 21st century about the validity of homeopathy is not entirely dissimilar to the criticism of Boericke's era. And, despite the rise in the sale of homeopathic preparations since the late 1980s, particularly in North America, Europe and India, there is one contrasting difference as of 2010: only Arizona, Connecticut, and Nevada license MDs and DOs to practice homeopathy.

== Personal life ==
William Boericke finished medical school in 1880 and moved back to San Francisco around 1881. On August 22, 1883, in San Francisco, he married Katherine (Kate) Worcester Fay (1861–1933), the daughter of Caleb Taylor Fay (1821–1885), a Forty-Niner from Massachusetts, San Francisco merchant, and participant in local and California state politics.

William and Kate Boericke had five sons and two daughters; the daughters were twins; two of the sons were:

1. Garth Wilkinson Boericke, MD (1893–1968), graduated in 1918 from the University of Michigan Medical School and taught pediatrics there. He became a surgeon and a published several articles in medical journals on homeopathic medicine. Garth's middle name was from James John Garth Wilkinson, a Swedenborgian writer and close friend of William Boericke.
2. Charles Caleb Boericke, MD (1897–1965), was a physician, surgeon, and influential exponent of homeopathic medicine.

== Affiliations ==
- 1883–1929: Member, American Institute of Homeopathy
- 1889: Founding director of the Astronomical Society of the Pacific

== Selected publications ==
=== Books ===
- The Twelve Tissue Remedies of Dr. Schüssler, arranged and compiled by William Boericke, MD, and Willis Alonzo Dewey, MD (1858–1938)
  - 1st ed., Philadelphia: Boericke & Hahnemann (1888); OCLC 2299218; copy at Google Books
  - 2nd ed., Philadelphia: Hahnemann (1890); OCLC 9734846; copy at Google Books
  - 3rd ed., Philadelphia: Boericke & Tafel (1893); OCLC 14797738; copy at Google Books
  - 4th ed., Philadelphia: Boericke & Tafel (1899); OCLC 10468461; copy at Google Books
  - 5th ed., Philadelphia: Boericke & Tafel (1914); OCLC 14792042
  - (four editions with Spanish translation)
- A Compend of the Principles of Homeopathy as Taught by Hahnemann, San Francisco: Boericke & Runyon (1896); OCLC 4786342; copy at Google Books
- The Treatment of Disease with the Twelve Tissue Remedies, San Francisco: Boericke & Runyon (1897); OCLC 599596002; copy at Google Books
- Pocket Manual of Homeopathic Materia Medica
  - 1st ed., San Francisco: Boericke & Runyon (1901); OCLC 15721973
  - 2nd ed., San Francisco: Homoeopathic Publishing Co. (1903); OCLC 8768059; copy at Google Books
  - Editions 3 through 9 include a repertory by Oscar Eugene Boericke, MD
  - 3rd ed., New York: Boericke & Runyan (1906); OCLC 14785632; copy at Google Books
  - 4th ed., New York: Boericke & Runyan (1909); OCLC 46666101
  - 5th ed., New York: Boericke & Runyan (1912); OCLC 768077541; copy at Google Books
  - 6th ed., New York: Boericke & Runyan (1916); OCLC 14801832; copy at Google Books
  - 7th ed., New York: Boericke & Runyan (1920); OCLC 17010853
  - 8th ed., New York: Boericke & Runyan (1922); OCLC 252383495
  - 9th ed., Santa Rosa, California: Boericke & Runyan (1927); OCLC 23127882, 469593004
- The Management and Care of Children – Including Homeopathic Treatment, San Francisco: Homeopathic Publishing Co. (1903); OCLC 827205602; copy at Google Books
- The Care, Feeding and Homeopathic Treatment of Children, 2nd ed., Boericke and Runyon (1911); OCLC 644881748; copy at Google Books

=== Translations ===
- Organon of Medicine, 6th ed., by Samuel Hahnemann, translation and preface by Boericke, intro by James Krauss, MD (1866–1939), Boericke & Tafel (1922); OCLC 4362454
  - A year before dying in 1843, Samuel Hahnemann completed the manuscript for the 6th edition of Organon of Medicine. But it remained unpublished for 79 years – until Richard M. Haehl (1873–1932) in 1921 and William Boericke in 1922 produced German and English versions, respectively. Hahnemann's manuscript is held at the University of California, San Francisco library. Boericke worked from the original manuscript; Haehl, of Stuttgart, worked from a handwritten copy.

=== Articles and lectures ===
- "Differentiation Between Melilotus, Glonoin and Belladonna", Pacific Coast Journal of Homeopathy, Vol. 8, No. 5, May 1905, pps. 101–103; OCLC 11613106
- "Hahnemann's Doctrine of Psora in the Treatment of Disease in Children", The Hahnemannian Monthly, Vol. 29, No. 32, August 1894, pps. 500–504; OCLC 1643077
- "Homeopathy – A Specialty in Therapeutics", Pacific Coast Journal of Homeopathy, Vol. 3, No. 12, December 1895, pps. 451–456; OCLC 11613106
- "Pain and Its Homeopathic Treatment", North American Journal of Homeopathy, Vol. 46, No. 5, May 1898, pps. 1–7; OCLC 10638011, 64159963
