= Robert Ellis Dudgeon =

Scottish homeopath

Robert Ellis Dudgeon (17 March 1820 – 8 September 1904) was a Scottish homeopath.

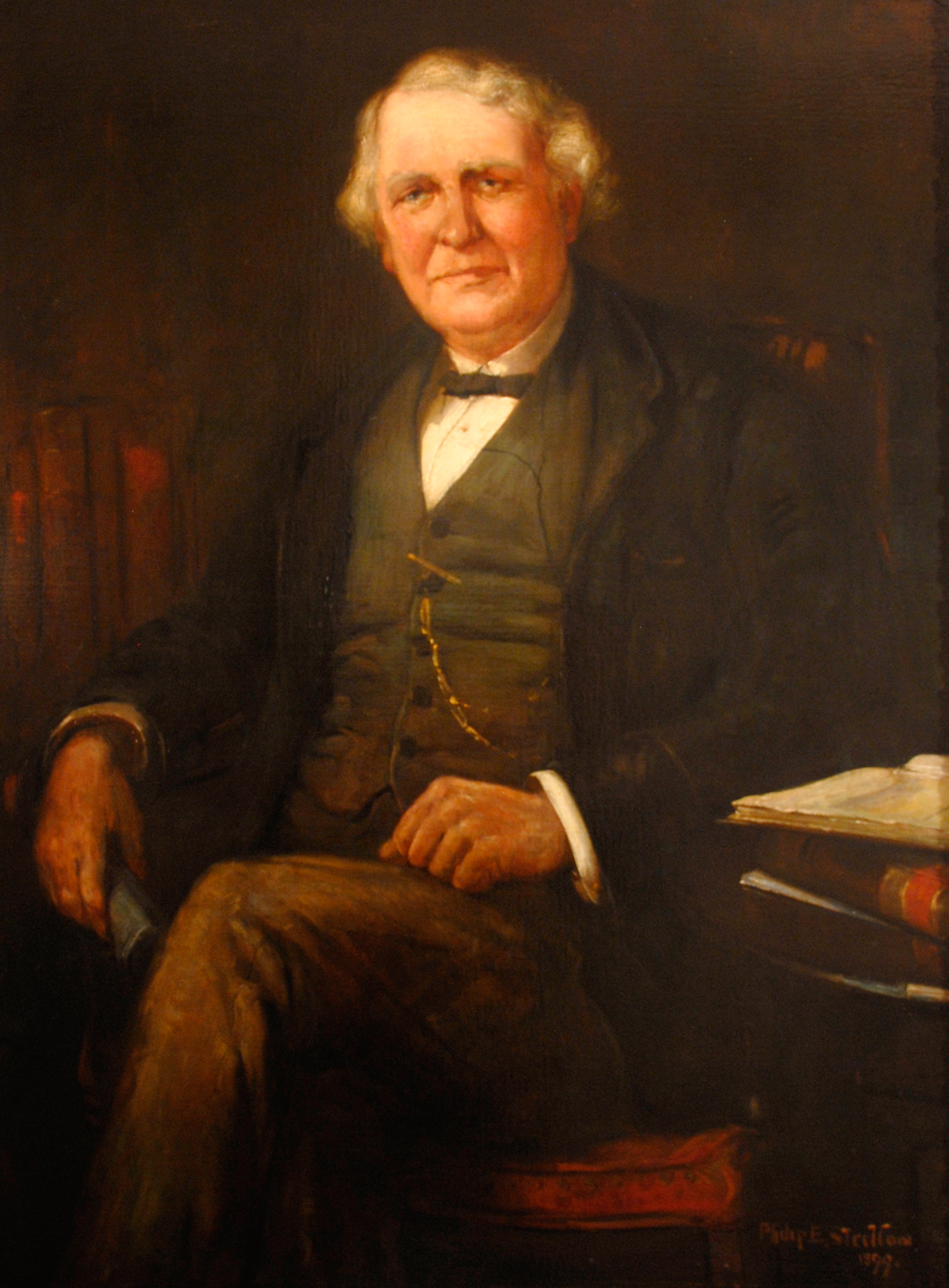
Robert Ellis Dudgeon, 1899 portrait

== Life ==
Born at Leith on 17 March 1820, Dudgeon was a younger son of a timber merchant and shipowner there. After attending a private school he received his medical education at Edinburgh, partly in the university and partly in the extra-academical medical school.

Having received the licence of the Royal College of Surgeons of Edinburgh in 1839, he attended lectures in Paris, by Velpeau, Andral, Louis, and others. He graduated M.D. at Edinburgh on 1 August 1841, and spent a semester at Vienna under Škoda, Rokitansky, Hebra, and Jäger. At Vienna fellow students John Drysdale and Rutherfurd Russell paid attention to fashionable homœopathic practice, developed by Samuel Hahnemann some forty years before; but Dudgeon was not at the time attracted by Hahnemann's system. From Vienna he went to Berlin to study diseases of the eye under Jüngken, of the ear under Kramer, and organic chemistry under Simon. He also went to Dublin to hear Dominic Corrigan, Robert James Graves, Henry Marsh and William Stokes.

Having begun practice in Liverpool, Dudgeon in 1843 was there persuaded by Drysdale to study homœopathy. The British Journal of Homœopathy was first issued in this year, and Dudgeon translated German articles for it. After a second stay in Vienna to follow the homœopathic practice of Wilhelm Fleischmann in the Gumpendorf hospital, he began to practise in London in 1845. He was editor of the British Journal of Homœopathy, with Drysdale and Russell from 1846 until 1884, when the Journal ceased.

In 1850 Dudgeon helped to found the Hahnemann Hospital and school of homœopathy in Bloomsbury Square, with which was connected the Hahnemann Medical Society. One of his patients, Robert Grosvenor, 1st Baron Ebury, assisted in defeating efforts by Sir James Simpson to have legislation passed against homeopaths practising. Dudgeon lectured in the school on the theory and practice of homœopathy and published his lectures in 1854. The legislative climate was still unfavourable, and the London Homeopathic Hospital set up in 1869 struggled as a school; certification was an issue, under the Medical Act 1858, and the teaching side closed in 1884; Dudgeon was for a short time assistant physician there. He was secretary of the British Homœopathic Society in 1848, vice-president in 1874–75, and president in 1878 and 1890.

Elected president of the International Homœopathic Congress which met in Atlantic City in 1904, Dudgeon did not attend because of bad health. He died at 22 Carlton Hill, London N.W., on 8 September 1904 and was cremated at Golder's Hill, his ashes being buried in Willesden cemetery.

== Works ==
In 1847 Dudgeon published Homœopathic Treatment and Prevention of Asiatic Cholera, and devoted himself over the next three years to an English translation of Hahnemann's writings, of which the Organon appeared in 1849, and the Materia Medica Pura in 1880. He edited several volumes for the Hahnemann Publications Society of Liverpool, including the Pathogenetic Cyclopædia (1850). He published Lectures on the Theory and Practice of Homœopathy (1854), and The Influence of Homœopathy on General Medicine since the Death of Hahnemann (1874). He also translated Ernst Fuchs's Causes and Prevention of Blindness (1885) and François Sarcey's Mind Your Eyes (1886), and wrote on The Swimming Baths of London (1870). In 1890, at the age of 70, he published On the Prolongation of Life, which reached a second edition.

In 1870–71 Dudgeon wrote notes on the Dioptrics of Vision (1871), and invented spectacles for use under water, intended to correct refraction. Original but unaccepted views which he held on the accommodation of the eye, and described to the International Medical Congress, were published in The Human Eye: its Optical Construction popularly explained (1878). In 1878 he obtained a Pond's sphygmograph, and with the help of J. Gauter he made a pocket instrument for registering the pulse. He published an account of it in The Sphygmograph: its history and use as an aid to diagnosis in ordinary practice (1882), and the device became known as the "Dudgeon sphygmograph". The approach was later adapted, and integrated with a recorder, by Sir James Mackenzie.

A utopian science fiction novel, Colymbia (1873), was a response to Erewhon of the previous year: Samuel Butler was a patient and friend.

== Family ==
Dudgeon was twice married, and had a family of two sons and three daughters. Zoë Gertrude, one of the daughters, married John Oakley Maund and then Sir Vincent Henry Penalver Caillard.

== Notes ==
Attribution

This article incorporates text from a publication now in the public domain: Lee, Sidney, ed. (1912). "Dudgeon, Robert Ellis". Dictionary of National Biography (2nd supplement). Vol. 1. London: Smith, Elder & Co.
