= Joseph von Quarin =

Austrian physician

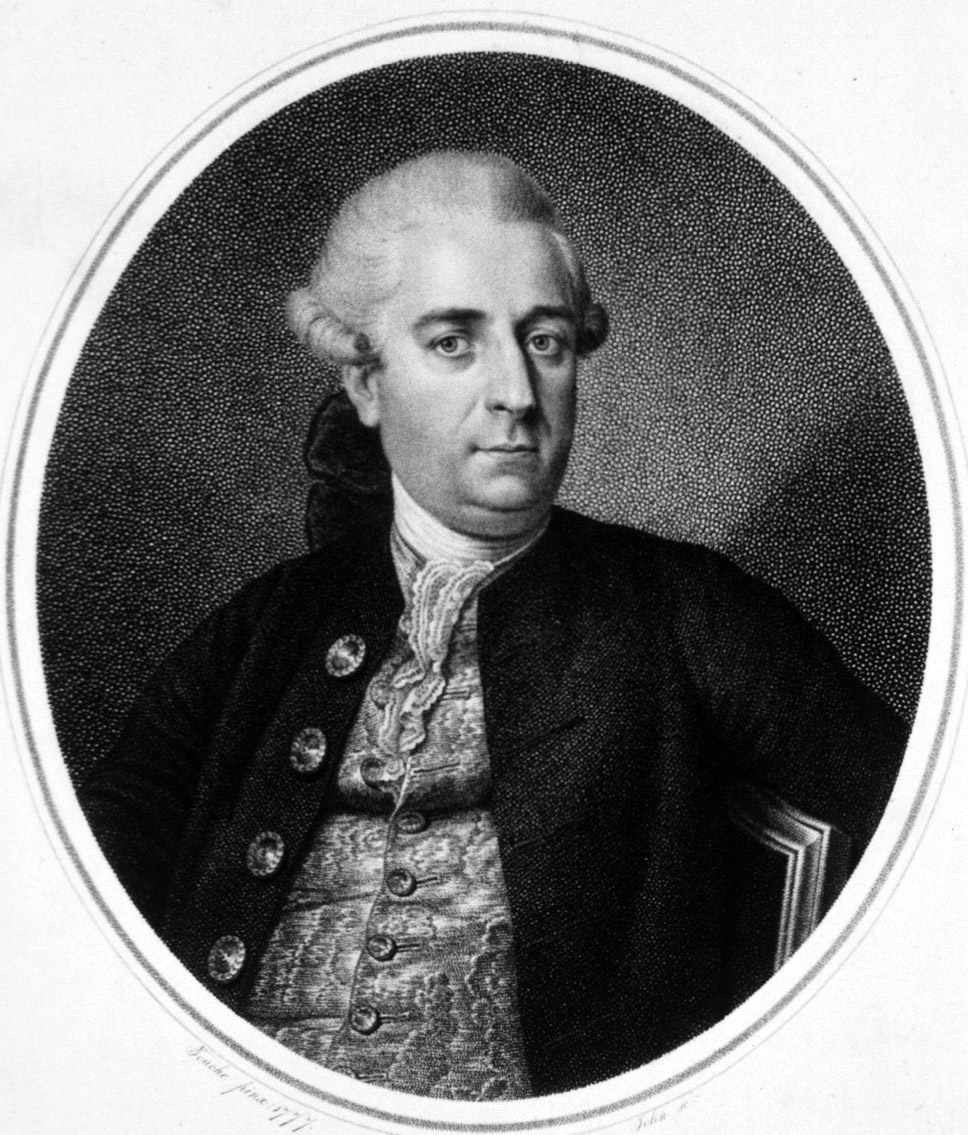
Joseph von Quarin

Joseph von Quarin (November 19, 1733 – March 19, 1814) was an Austrian physician born in Vienna.

At the age of 15, he obtained his PhD in Vienna, followed by studies of medicine at the University of Freiburg. In 1751 he received his medical doctorate, afterwards returning to Vienna, where in 1754 he attained the title of professor. At Vienna he gave lectures in anatomy and pharmacology, and on six occasions, he served as university rector. Among his medical students was Samuel Hahnemann, who later founded a system of therapeutics known as homeopathy.

In 1758 he was appointed to the Imperial Council as a medical officer by Maria Theresa. In 1784 he was chosen director of the Allgemeines Krankenhaus in Vienna by Joseph II. He is credited for developing the hospital into a model European institution. Also, through his initiative, a Findelhaus (foundling hospital) was established in 1788.

== Selected writings ==
- Tentamen de Cicuta, 1761 Digital edition by the University and State Library Düsseldorf
- Methodus medendarum febrium, 1772
- Methodus medendarum inflammationum, 1773
- Heilmethode der Entzündungen, 1776 - Methods of cure for inflammation.
- Betrachtungen über die Hospitäler Wiens, 1784 - Considerations involving Vienna hospitals.
- Animadversiones practicae in diversos morbos, 1786.
- Neues Quarinisches Dispensatorium : zum Gebrauche der Spitäler und anderer milden Anstalten für arme Kranke; nebst der beigef. Taxe für die Arzneimittel . de Paula Merr, Innsbruck 1790 Digital edition by the University and State Library Düsseldorf
