= Fragmenta de viribus =

1805 reference book by Samuel Hahnemann

Fragmenta de viribus is a homeopathic reference book published in Leipzig in 1805.

The book was written by Samuel Hahnemann and published in Latin, in two volumes. The full title is Fragmenta de viribus medicamentorum: positivis sive in sano corpore humano observatis (Fragmentary Observations relative to the Positive Powers of Medicines on the healthy Human Body).

The first volume of Fragmenta de viribus lists the detailed symptoms caused by 27 different drugs."The frequently appearing symptoms were stressed by italics. The second volume contains the totality of the symptoms in alphabetical order."

Fragmenta de viribus lists the health effects of 27 drugs in common use as recorded in the medical literature along with Hahnemann's own observations from taking the drugs himself: "The first collection of the effects of medicines ... according to his own observations and those of others was, as is well known, published in the work, Fragmenta de viribus medicamentorum, 1805." These were "medicinal substances whose pure pathogenetic action he had ascertained by experiments on himself, his family, and a few friends."

Fragmenta de viribus makes no mention of homeopathy or any theories of cure and makes no claims about their uses. However, it is widely regarded, as the forerunner of Hahnemann's Materia Medica Pura, part one of which was published in 1811: "the Materia Medica Pura had had its precursor in the Fragmenta." "The work, begun in the "Fragmenta," was continued in the "Materia Medica Pura," the first volume of which appeared in 1811 followed by five more volumes up to 1821."
