= Vienna General Hospital =

Hospital in Vienna, Austria

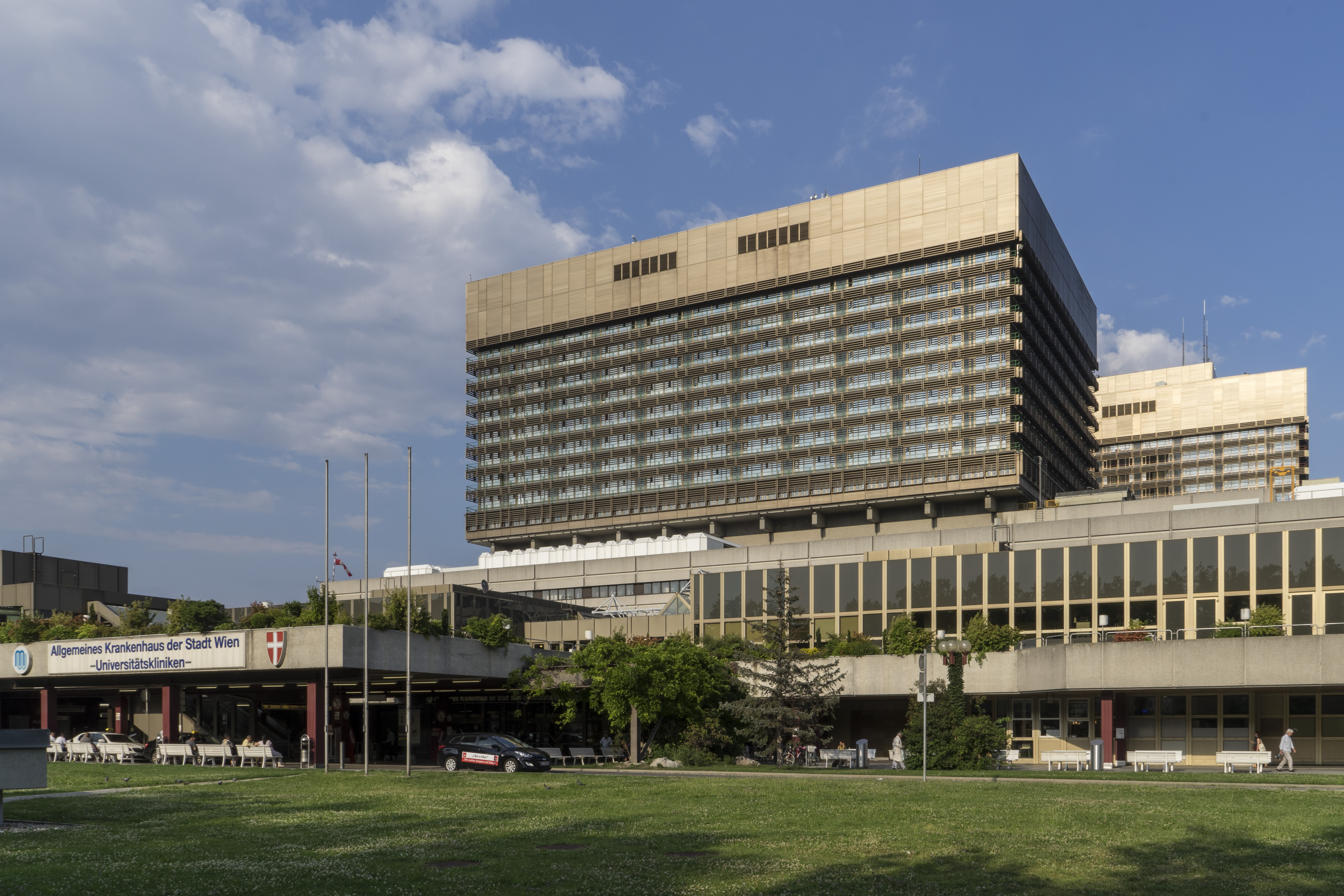
- Main entrance

Geography
- Location: Vienna, Austria
- Coordinates: 48°13′12″N 16°20′51″E

Organisation
- Type: General
- Affiliated university: Medical University of Vienna

Services
- Beds: 1,742

History
- Opened: 1697

Links
- Lists: Hospitals in Austria

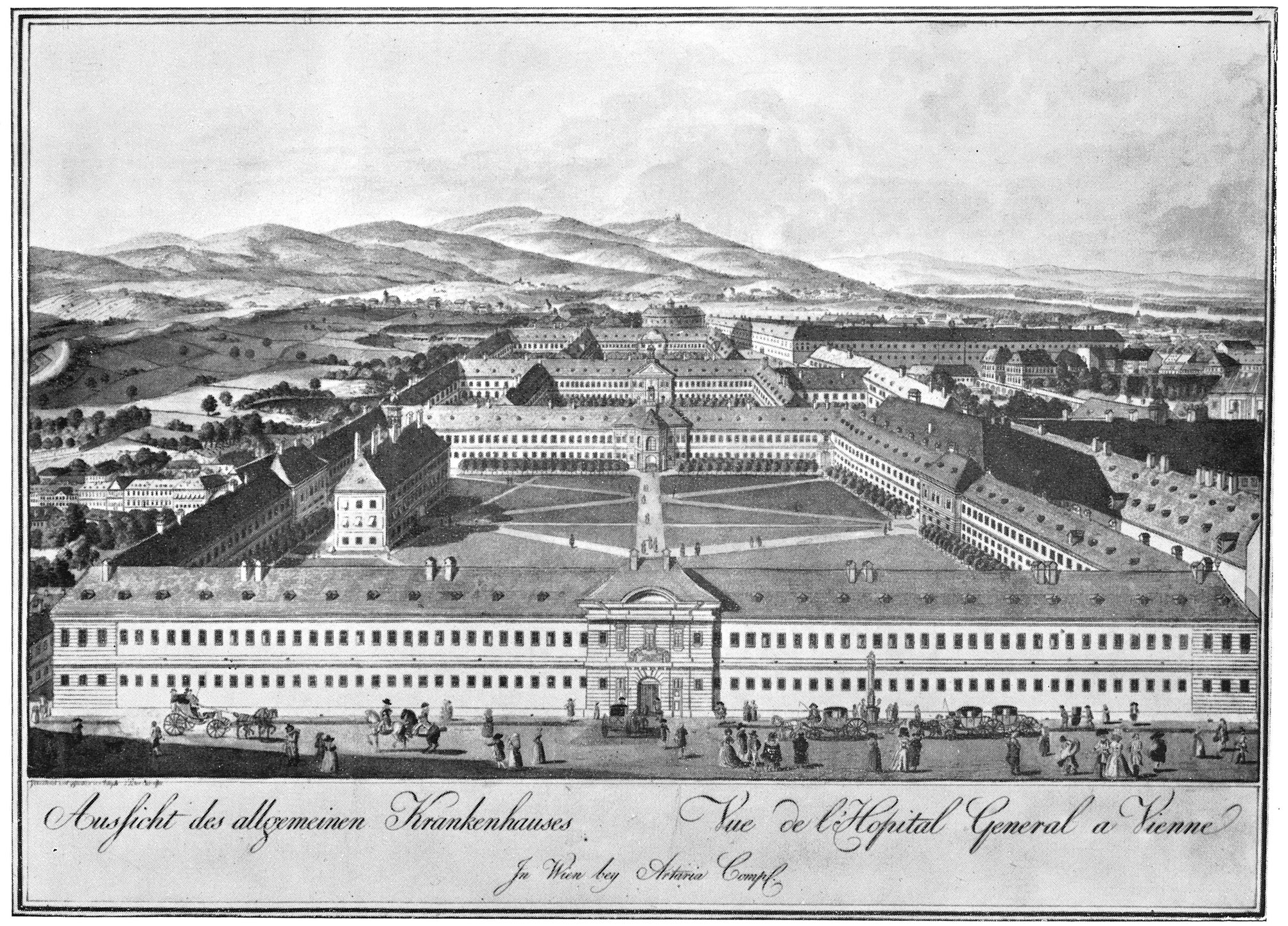
Vienna General Hospital, 1784

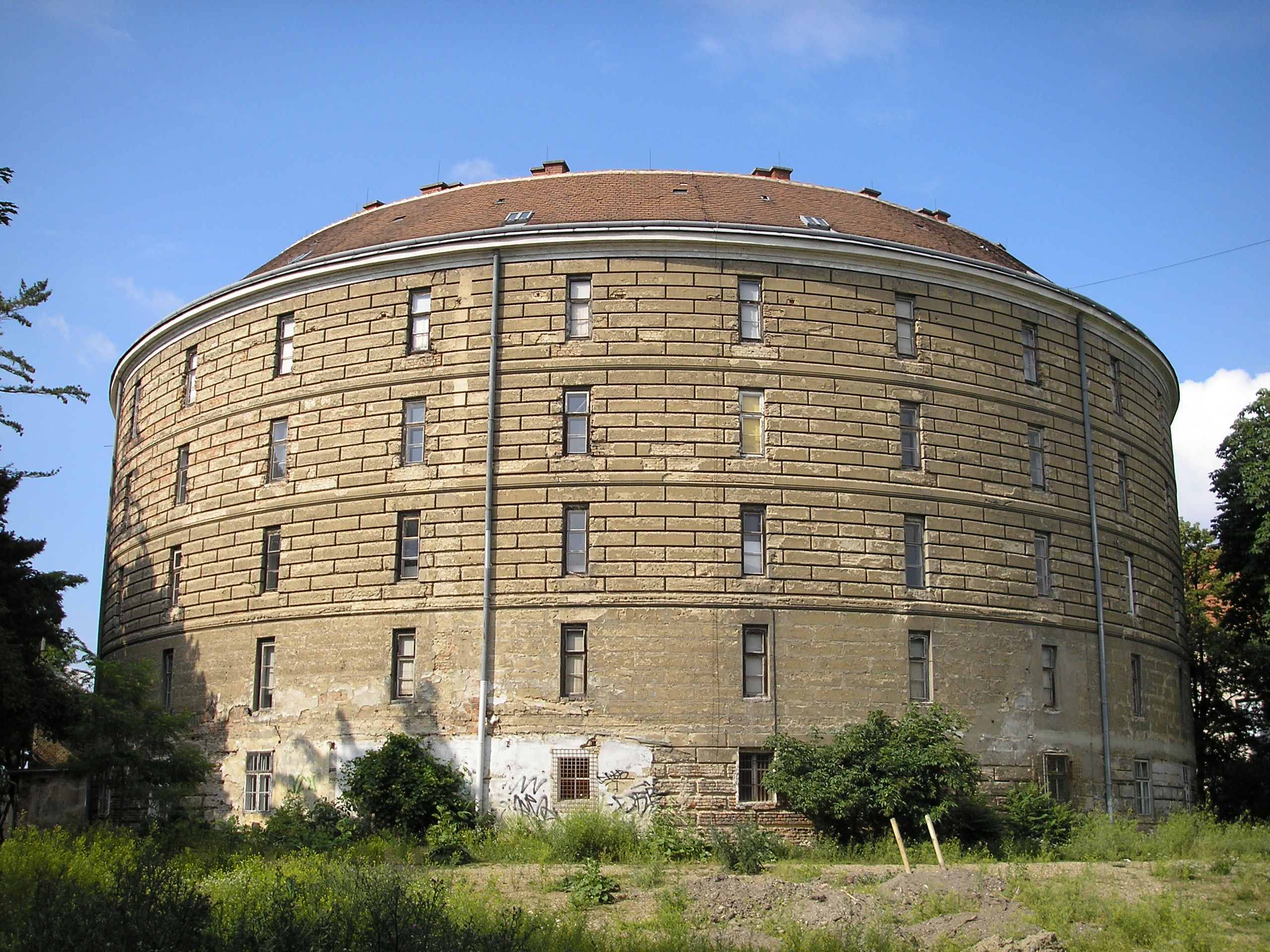
The Narrenturm, built circa 1782

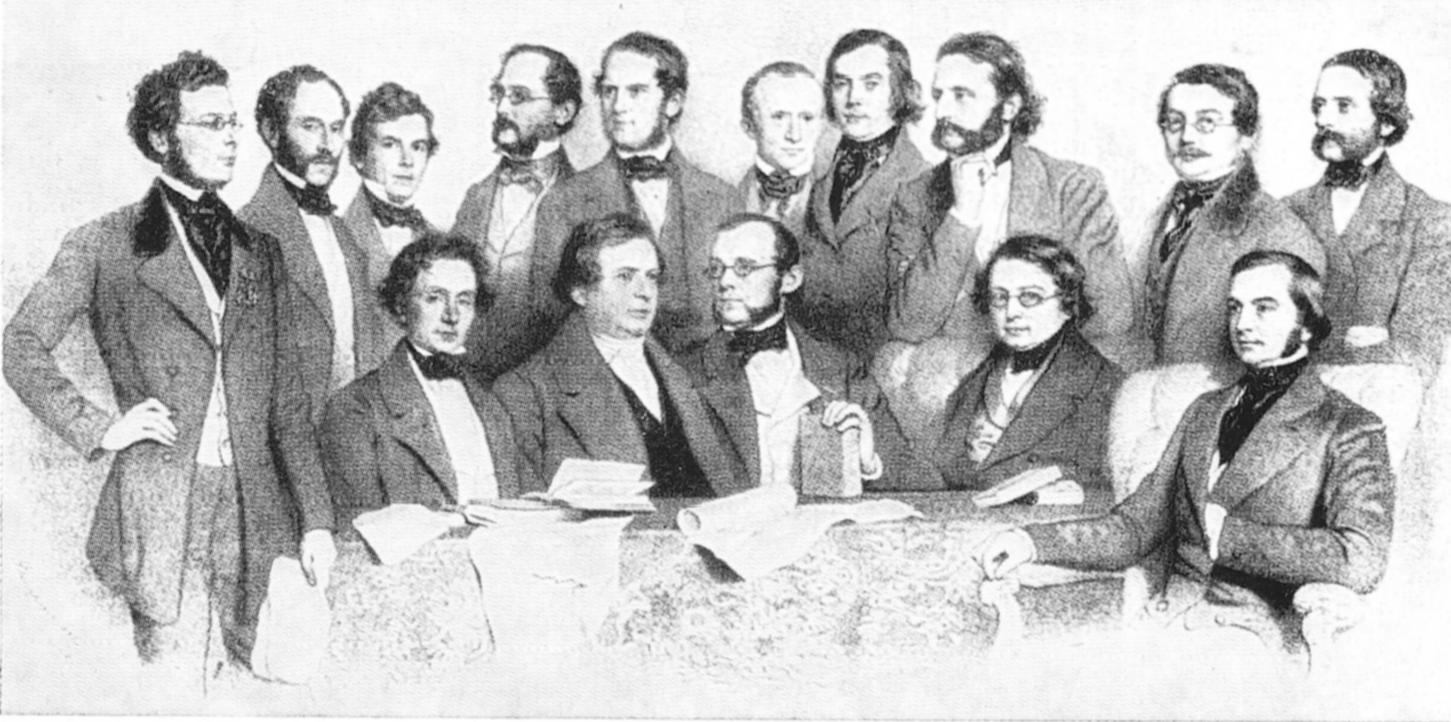
Professors of the Medical School, 1853

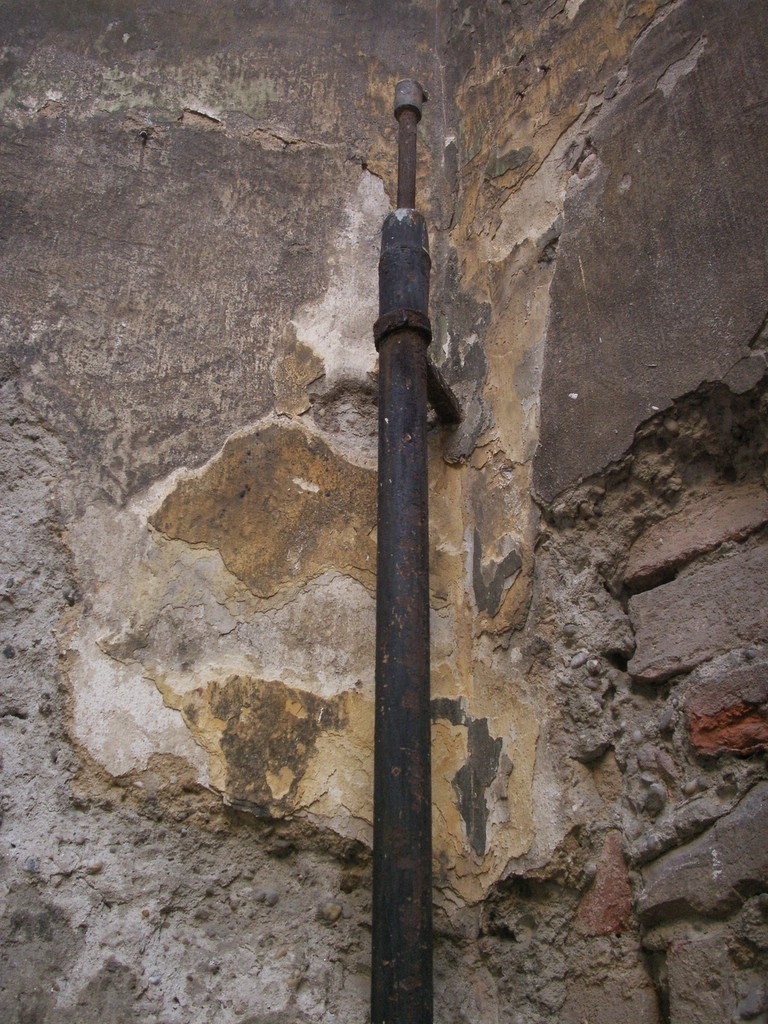
One of the oldest lightning rods in the world, at the Narrenturm

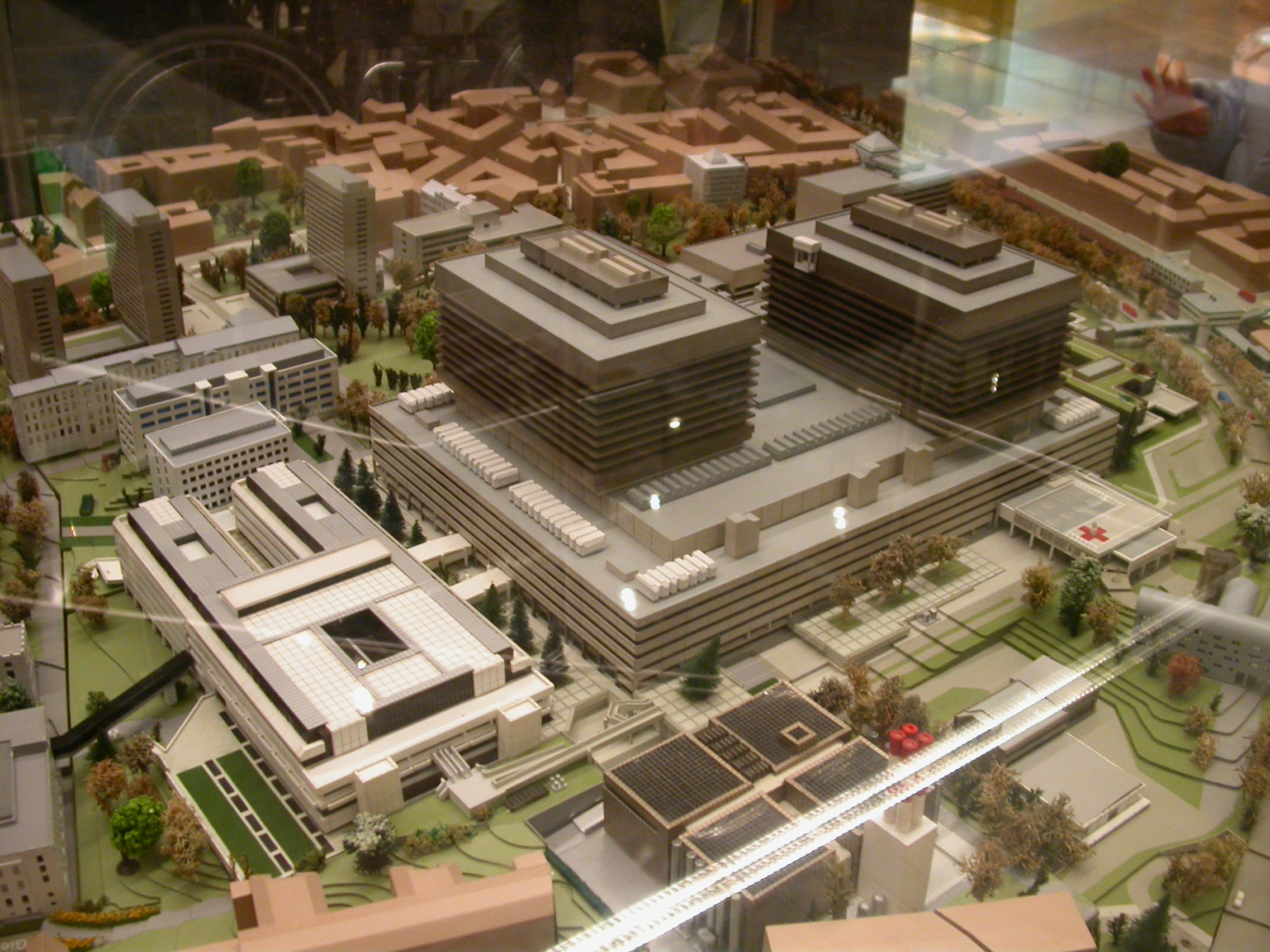
Model of the new AKH

Ignaz Philipp Semmelweis commemorative coin featuring the General Hospital in Vienna

The Vienna General Hospital (German: Allgemeines Krankenhaus der Stadt Wien; AKH) is the general hospital in Vienna, Austria. It is also the city's university hospital, and the site of the Medical University of Vienna. It is Europe's fifth largest hospital, both by number of employees and bed capacity.

== History ==
=== Old AKH ===
The origins of Vienna General Hospital go back to Dr. Johann Franckh, who donated properties in 1686, after the end of the second Siege of Vienna, at the corridor Schaffernack for the establishment of a military hospital. However, since money was lacking for the establishment of the buildings, the disabled veterans were quartered, including families, in the Kontumazhof (epidemic hospital), already in existence. In 1693, Emperor Leopold I arranged the establishment of the large hospital. In 1697, the first ward was finished, into which 1,042 persons were quartered.

By 1724, 1,740 persons lived there. Extension of the complex was made possible by the will of Ferdinand Baron von Thavonat, who left his estate to disabled soldiers in 1726. The marriage or widow yard, now Thavonathof, was to be finished. Also, the side yards formed by Zwischentrakte, the patient yard (4.), Restaurant economics (5.) and craftsman center (7.) were established.

During 1752 to 1774, further development occurred for the student yard (3.) and the house supervisor yard (6.). The inhabitants had to wear their own uniforms and received individual copper coins, which could be redeemed with the bakers in the complex, butchers, etc. The dissolution of the neighbouring cemetery came finally in 1834 of the 8th and 9th wards, in addition.

On January 28, 1783, Emperor Joseph II visited the poorhouse. He stated the fact that the enormous plant served more as an accommodation for people who gained entry by virtue of their connections. Those who were the neediest were still in need of care. Professor Dr. Joseph Quarin, who later became director, used a general hospital plan.

On August 16, 1784, the opening took place. The hospital was responsible initially only for the attendance of patients; the remaining tasks of hospitals were separate. Attached to the hospital was a maternity ward, an orphanage, and a lunatic asylum. The Narrenturm was the first special building for the accommodation of mental patients.

Particularly in the 19th century, Vienna General Hospital was the center of the Viennese Medical School, as one of the centers of medical research. There Ignaz Semmelweis made his observations of hygiene, and Karl Landsteiner discovered the groups of blood types.

The site of the old AKH is used as the campus of the University of Vienna, and includes mostly humanities institutes.

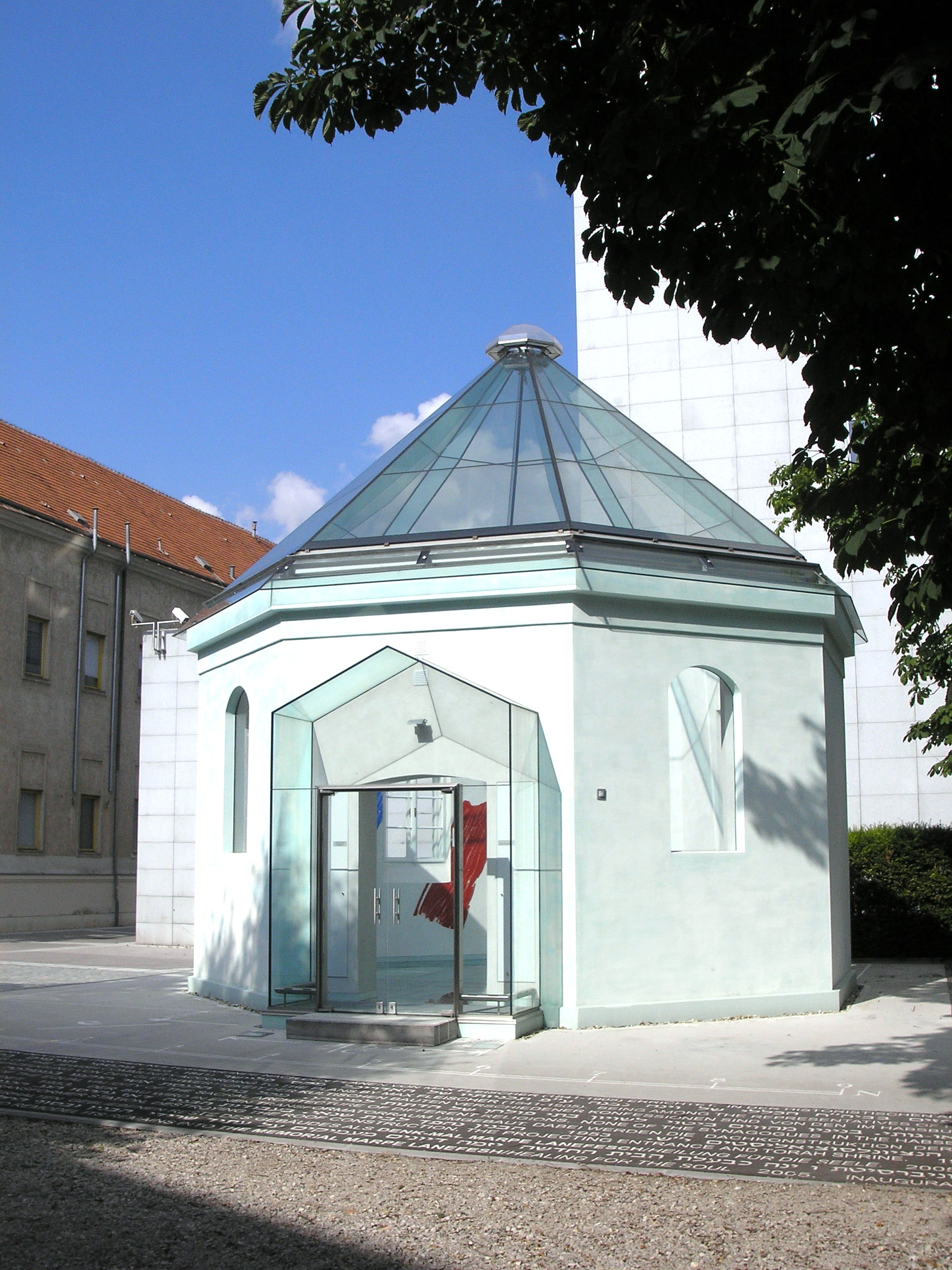
The 1903 synagogue in the old AKH, renovated in 2005

==== The synagogue ====
The synagogue in the old AKH Vienna was established in 1903 by architect Max Fleischer as the "praying pavilion" for patients of Jewish faith. The synagogue was devastated during the Third Reich's Kristallnacht in 1938, and further destroyed when converted after the war, in 1953, into a transformer station. In 2005, the remains of the building were restored to become the Marpe Lanefesch Memorial.

==== The Narrenturm (Fool's Tower) ====
In the old AKH stands the first building worldwide for the accommodation of mental patients, established in 1784 under Emperor Joseph II by Isidore Canevale. Today, it is the seat of the Federal Pathological-Anatomical Museum, Vienna. The building consisted of a five-part fortress-like circular building with slot-like windows for 200 to 250 mental patients. In its strict geometrical form and austerity, the building is considered as a high point of the revolution classicism. Each cell had strong lattice doors and rings for chaining unrestrained patients. Ten years later, the tower was already completely outdated due to innovations in the therapy for mental patients. From its round form is derived the usual colloquial designation in Vienna, Gugelhupf, meaning a round Austrian cake. The notion that the Fool's Tower is a conversion of the idea of the Panopticon of Jeremy Bentham does not apply, since the cells are not controllable from a central observation post.

Already at the oldest model, the Fool's Tower has at the roofridge a lightning rod or a Blitzfänger. Two of its mounting plates in the inner court still exist. The apparatus, devised by the Czech priest and inventor Prokop Diviš and installed in 1754, was probably not intended as lightning protection. Josef II knew well the attempts of Diviš, which specifically concerned an assumed health benefit from currents. Whether the lightning conductors were used for the treatment of the patients has not been clarified.

=== Nazi era ===
In 1939, a year after Austria's Anschluss with Hitler's Third Reich, the General Hospital was transferred to municipal administration.

Reporting on March 28, 1938, shortly after Austria's Anschluss with Nazi Germany, Time wrote of the devastating impact of the persecution of the many Jewish doctors in Vienna, listing the suicides, both Jewish and non-Jewish, including "Professor Arnold Baumgarten, 58, part-Jewish director of Vienna's largest city hospital (1,000 beds), onetime head of the Austrian State health department" and "Professor Wolfgang Denk, 55, University & General Hospital chief surgeon, author of the textbook on surgery most widely used in Austria, no Jew." It later became known that Baumgarten had succeeded in fleeing to China.

=== New AKH ===
With time, the Joseph-era buildings of the general hospital became unwieldy, so in 1957, it was decided to establish a new large central hospital, about half a kilometer from the Josephine location. The building of the new AKH began in the summer of 1964. At the beginning, the personnel hostels and the university clinics for child medicine were moved. In 1974, the building of the main house began. This consists of an outpatient clinic and OI area (approx. 50 OI halls) and two large, 22-floor high bed towers, which accommodate 2,200 beds.

The AKH is connected with its own underground (metro) station (U6 Michelbeuern/AKH) to the public transportation network. The Zentralbau with the bed towers was officially opened in 1994, but already partly in use from 1991. The total construction costs are equivalent, in 2004 values, to approximately 4.5 billion euro, projected as 1 billion Schilling (72.67 million euro originally). The construction costs are carried together by the city of Vienna and the Austrian federation. The cost explosion and an associated bribery affair with the building of the new AKH led to the AKH scandal, the largest Austrian building scandal.

At present, about 9,000 people are employed at the AKH. Of these, approximately 1,600 physicians and 4,500 allied health and nursing workers attend to patients. Annually, nearly 95,000 people are treated as inpatients, and another half-million attend the hospital's 384 outpatient clinics. Over 11,000 students are registered at the Medical University of Vienna.

== See also ==
- Austrian €50 Ignaz Philipp Semmelweis commemorative coin - with hospital motif
- History of the Jews in Vienna
- Hofburg - Royal court buildings during the time period
