= British Journal of Homoeopathy =

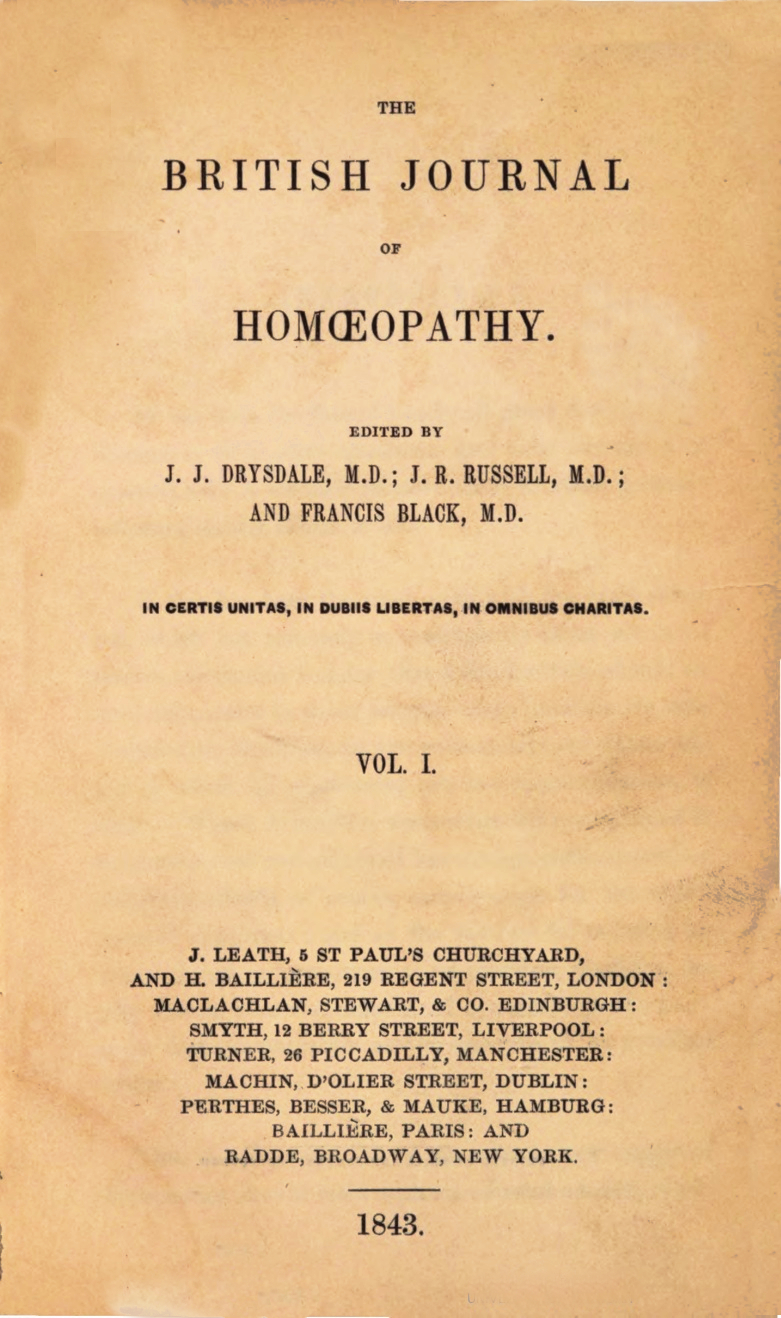
- Discipline: Homeopathy
- Language: English
- Edited by: John James Drysdale; John Rutherfurd Russell; Francis Black; Robert Ellis Dudgeon

Publication details
- History: 1843–1884

Standard abbreviations
- ISO 4: Br. J. Homeopathy

Indexing
- OCLC no.: 11357134

Links
- Archive

The British Journal of Homoeopathy was first published in 1843, and was edited by John James Drysdale, John Rutherfurd Russell, and Francis Black. Robert Ellis Dudgeon joined in 1846. For many years it was the foremost homoeopathic journal in the world. Its motto was In certis unitas, in dubiis libertas, in omnibus charitas. The journal ceased publication in 1884.
