= The Organon of the Healing Art =

1810 book defending the homeopathy

Organon of the Art of Healing
- Sixth edition cover
- Author: Samuel Hahnemann
- Original title: Organon der Heilkunst
- Translator: Charles H. Devrient (4th ed., 1833)
- Language: English translation from German
- Genre: Medicine, Philosophy
- Publisher: W.F. Wakeman
- Publication date: 1833
- Publication place: Germany
- Media type: Print
- Pages: 272
- OCLC: 32732625
- Preceded by: 3rd Edition, 1824
- Followed by: 5th Edition, 1833

Organon of the Art of Healing (Organon der rationellen Heilkunde) by Samuel Hahnemann, 1810, laid out the doctrine of his ideas of homoeopathy. The work was repeatedly revised by Hahnemann and published in six editions, with the name changed from the second onwards to Organon of Medicine (Organon der Heilkunst), and has been so since the mid-19th century.

== The Book ==
Hahnemann wrote this book in order to document his new system of medicine, "Homoeopathy". In 1796, some six years after Hahnemann first experienced the effect of Peruvian Bark Cinchona in 1790 he published an article under the title "Essay on a New Principle".

After conducting personal observations and experiments, Hahnemann published his new account of homoeopathy in book form in 1810. The original title of the book was Organon of Rational Art of Healing. In 1819, the second edition was published, with the revised title Organon of Healing Art. The third edition (1824) and fourth edition (1829) kept this new title, while the latter introduced Hahnemann's "Theory of Chronic Diseases".

The fifth edition was published in 1833, and included the doctrine of vital force and drug-dynamization. The sixth edition, written in 1842, a year before his death, was retitled Organon of Medicine and not published until 1921.

=== Editions ===
==== First edition ====
The first edition of the Organon was published in 1810 in Dresden while Hahnemann was residing in Torgau. Titled Organon der rationellen Heilkunde nach homöopathischen Gesetzen, it contained 271 aphorisms. In 1913, an English translation by C.E. Wheeler appeared called the Organon of the Rational Art of Healing, published in the Everyman's Library series by J M Dent in London.

Below the title of the Book was written a small couplet from Gallert's poem -

The truth we mortals need

Us blest to make and keep,

The All-wise slightly covered over

But did not bury deep.

==== Second edition ====
The second edition of the Organon was published in the year 1819 when Hahnemann was living in Leipzig in Germany. Titled Organon Der Heilkunst, it had 315 aphorisms. In 1824, it was translated to French by Erneste George de Brunnow and was named Organon of the Healing Art. The couplet from Gallert's poem was replaced by the words Aude Sapere which mean Dare to be Wise. No English translation of this edition has ever been made. There is also an Italian translation of 1824 by Bernardo Quaranta "L'Organo della Medicina del dottor Samuel Hahnemann" printed in Naples.

==== Third edition ====
The third edition of the Organon was published in the year 1824 when Hahnemann was resident in Köthen (Anhalt) in Germany. It contained 317 aphorisms. Though French and Italian translations exist, this edition has never been translated into English. On page 3 of the Italian translation of Organon 3, the following quotation from Seneca the Younger appears:

"Non enim cuiquam mancipavi, nullius nomen fero: multum magnorum judicio credo, aliquid et meo vindico." (Seneca the Younger, Epistulae Morales ad Lucilium – Epistle 45.4, Moral Letters to Lucilius)

"For I have sold myself to no-one; I bear the name of no master. I give much credit to the judgment of great men; but I claim something for myself."

This quotation does not appear in any of the other Organon editions or translations, and was probably therefore added by the translator of the Italian edition.

==== Fourth edition ====
The fourth edition of the Organon was published in the year 1829 when Hahnemann was living in Köthen. It contained 292 aphorisms. An English translation by Charles H. Devrient was published in Dublin in 1833. Hahnemann's miasm theory, deriving from his two volume work, The Chronic Diseases published the previous year (1828), was first alluded to in this edition. Likewise, the 'vital force' theory makes its first significant appearance in this edition.

==== Fifth edition ====
The fifth edition of the Organon was published in the year 1833 when Hahnemann was living in Köthen. It contained 294 aphorisms. It was later twice translated into English by Robert Ellis Dudgeon, first in 1849 and again in 1893. The fifth edition of the book was also translated to English by C. Wesselehoft. This fifth Organon departed significantly in style and content from the four previous editions by making numerous references to metaphysical notions like the vital force, miasms and potency energy.

==== Sixth edition ====
The sixth edition of the Organon was not a full edition in the usual sense but merely a copy of the 5th Organon which Hahnemann had annotated in February 1842 with numerous revisions before his death in 1843 in Paris.

In a letter from Paris dated June 1, 1841 he states, "I am preparing the sixth edition of the Organon, to which I can only devote a few hours on Thursdays and Sundays." However, in a letter to his publisher in Düsseldorf, dated 20 Feb 1842, he wrote, "I have now, after eighteen months of work, finished my sixth edition of my Organon, the most nearly perfect of all."

The Sixth Organon was not published until long after his death, in 1921. It contains 291 aphorisms and was named Organon der Medizin. It was later translated into the English language by William Boericke and given the title, Organon of Medicine. It contained several new additions and alterations including the change of "Vital Force" to "Vital Principle", the introduction of the 50 Millesimal Scale of Potentisation, and changes in the preparation, administration and repetition of drugs.

== Outline of the Organon of Medicine ==
The book begins with a preface by the author on the subject, with table of contents and a vast introduction to the subject, the philosophy and the presentation of how Homoeopathy became a method of practice in the medical profession.

The fifth edition of the Organon of Medicine is split into "Aphorisms", numbered 1 to 294. The doctrine of Homoeopathy is discussed in the first seventy aphorisms, often referred to as the theoretical part: The sub-division of the philosophy of Homoeopathy is below:

=== Theoretical part ===
1. The mission of Physician and Highest Ideal of cure. Aphorisms 1 and 2
2. Requisite knowledge of a physician. Aphorisms 3 and 4
3. Knowledge of disease. Aphorisms 5–18
4. Knowledge of drugs. Aphorisms 19–21
5. Application of drug knowledge to disease. Aphorisms 22–27
6. Knowledge of choice of remedy, different modes of treatment, superiority of homoeopathic therapeutics. Aphorisms 28–70

Aphorisms 71–294 are known as the practical part:

=== Practical part ===
1. Three points, which are necessary for curing. Aphorism 71
2. Classification of disease. Aphorisms 72–80
3. Case Taking: recording of patient data. Aphorisms 83–104
4. Knowledge of medicinal power, curative power and drug proving. Aphorisms 105–145
5. Proving of drugs
6. Most suitable method of employing medicine to a patient. Aphorisms 146–261
7. Allied support during treatment, diet in acute diseases. Aphorisms 262–263
8. Preparation of medicines. Aphorisms 267–269
9. Administration of medicines. Aphorisms 271–292
10. Mesmerism. Aphorisms 293–294
