= George W. Carey =

American homeopath and astrologer (1845–1924)

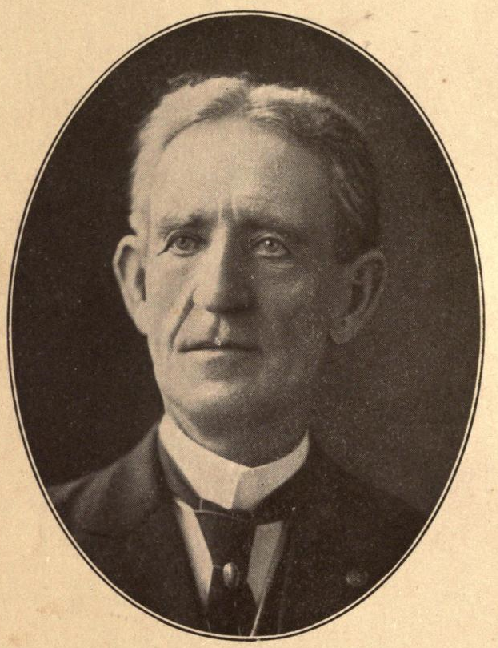
- George W. Carey
- Born: George Washington Carey; September 7, 1845; Dixon, Lee County, Illinois
- Died: November 16/17, 1924; San Diego, California
- Occupations: Homeopath and occultist

George Washington Carey (September 7, 1845 – November 16/17, 1924) - Born in Dixon, Lee County, Illinois, and died in San Diego, California. He was an American homeopath and occultist known for a number of 1910s ‘chemistry of life’ publications, a subject which he referred to as biochemistry, particularly his 1919 The Chemistry of Human Life, all generally using a mixture of religion, astrology, physiology, anatomy, and chemistry, themed particularly with a mineral-based theory of human disease. Carey is popular among homeopathic and new age circles. In the context of a person viewed as a "human molecule", Carey was the first to state that a person's body is a “chemical formula in operation.”

Carey was influenced by Wilhelm Heinrich Schüßler ideas about "cell salts". He founded his own biochemical college.

== Publications ==
- The Biochemic System of Medicine: Comprising the Theory, Pathological Action, Therapeutical Application, Materia Medica, and Repertory of Schuessler's Twelve Tissue Remedies (1894)
- The Tree of Life: An Expose of Physical Regenesis on the Three-Fold Plane of Bodily, Chemical and Spiritual Operation (1917)
- The Wonders of the Human Body: Physical Regeneration According to the Laws of Chemistry and Physiology (1918)
- The Anti-Christ (1918)
- The Chemistry of Human Life (1919)
- God-Man: The Word Made Flesh (with Inez Eudora Perry, 1920)
- Road to the Moon: A Great Occult Story (1924)
- The Zodiac and the Salts of Salvation (with Inez Eudora Perry, 1932)
- The Chemistry and Wonders of the Human Body (1996)
- Relation of the Mineral Salts of the Body to the Signs of the Zodiac (1996)
