= Samuel Hahnemann =

German physician who created homeopathy (1755–1843)

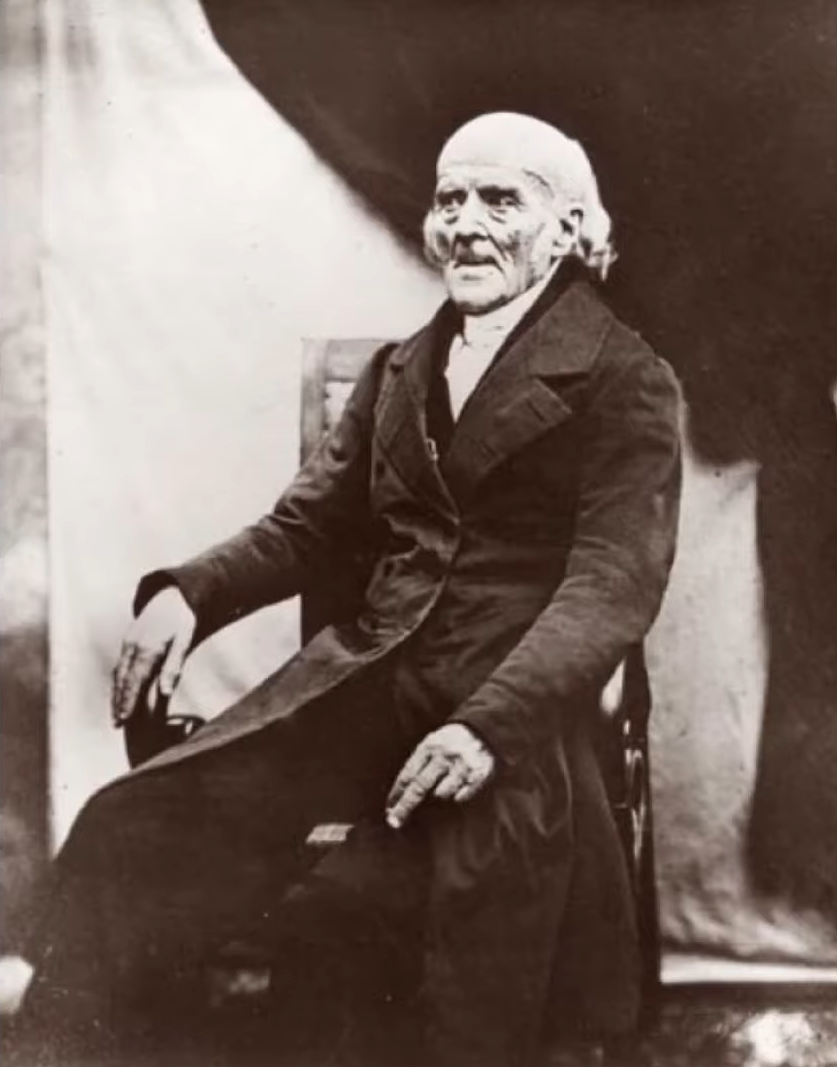
- Hahnemann in 1841
- Born: Christian Friedrich Samuel Hahnemann; 10 April 1755; Meissen, Electorate of Saxony
- Died: 2 July 1843 (aged 88); Paris, France
- Education: University of Erlangen
- Known for: Homeopathy
- Spouse(s): Johanna Henriette Kuchler; Mélanie d'Hervilly

Christian Friedrich Samuel Hahnemann (/ˈhɑːnəmən/ HAH-nə-mən, German: [ˈzaːmueːl ˈhaːnəman]; 10 April 1755 – 2 July 1843) was a German medical doctor, best known for creating the pseudoscientific system of alternative medicine called homeopathy.

== Early life ==
Christian Friedrich Samuel Hahnemann was born in Meissen, Saxony, near Dresden. His father, Christian Gottfried Hahnemann, was a painter and designer of porcelain, for which the town of Meissen is famous.

As a young man, Hahnemann became proficient in a number of languages, including English, French, Italian, Greek and Latin. He eventually made a living as a translator and teacher of languages, gaining further proficiency in "Arabic, Syriac, Chaldaic and Hebrew".

Hahnemann studied medicine for two years at Leipzig. Citing Leipzig's lack of clinical facilities, he moved to Vienna, where he studied for ten months. His medical professors in Leipzig and Vienna included the physician Joseph von Quarin, later credited for turning Vienna General Hospital into a model European medical institution.

After one term of further study, Hahnemann graduated with a medical degree with honors from the University of Erlangen on 10 August 1779. His poverty may have forced him to choose Erlangen, as the school's fees were lower than in Vienna. Hahnemann's thesis was titled Conspectus adfectuum spasmodicorum aetiologicus et therapeuticus [A Dissertation on the Causes and Treatment of Spasmodic Diseases].

== Medical practice ==
In 1781, Hahnemann took a village doctor's position in the copper-mining area of Mansfeld, Saxony. He soon married Johanna Henriette Kuchler and would eventually have eleven children. After abandoning medical practice and while working as a translator of scientific and medical textbooks, he translated fifteen books from English, six from French, and one each from Latin and Italian from 1777 to 1806. Hahnemann travelled around Saxony for many years, staying in many different towns and villages for varying lengths of time, never living far from the River Elbe and settling at different times in Dresden, Torgau, Leipzig and Köthen (Anhalt) before finally moving to Paris in June 1835.

=== Creation of homeopathy ===
Hahnemann was dissatisfied with the state of medicine in his time and particularly objected to practices such as bloodletting. He claimed that the medicine he had been taught to practice sometimes did the patient more harm than good:

My sense of duty would not easily allow me to treat the unknown pathological state of my suffering brethren with these unknown medicines. The thought of becoming in this way a murderer or malefactor towards the life of my fellow human beings was most terrible to me, so terrible and disturbing that I wholly gave up my practice in the first years of my married life and occupied myself solely with chemistry and writing.

After giving up his practice around 1784, Hahnemann made his living chiefly as a writer and translator while resolving also to investigate the causes of medicine's alleged errors. While translating William Cullen's A Treatise on the Materia Medica, Hahnemann encountered the claim that cinchona, the bark of a Peruvian tree, was effective in treating malaria because of its astringency. Hahnemann believed other astringent substances were ineffective against malaria and began to research cinchona's effect on the human body by self-application. Noting that the drug induced malaria-like symptoms in himself, he concluded that it would do so in any healthy individual. This led him to postulate a healing principle: "That which can produce a set of symptoms in a healthy individual, can treat a sick individual who is manifesting a similar set of symptoms." This principle, like cures like, became the basis for an approach to medicine to which he gave the name homeopathy. He first used the term homeopathy in his essay Indications of the Homeopathic Employment of Medicines in Ordinary Practice, published in Hufeland's Journal in 1807.

=== Development of homeopathy ===
Following up the work of the Viennese physician Anton von Störck, Hahnemann tested substances for the effects they produced on a healthy individual, presupposing (as von Störck had claimed) that they may heal the same ills that they caused. His research led him to agree with von Störck that the toxic effects of ingested substances are often broadly parallel to certain disease states, and his exploration of historical cases of poisoning in the medical literature further implied a more generalised medicinal "law of similars". Through his own experiments, he concluded that various substances which created certain symptoms in overdose, those same substances when given to people with similar symptoms in specially prepared small doses resulted in a healing effect. He later devised methods of diluting the drugs he was testing in order to mitigate their toxic effects. He claimed that these dilutions when prepared according to his technique of "potentization" using dilution and succussion (vigorous shaking), were still effective in alleviating the same symptoms in the sick. His more systematic experiments with dose reduction really commenced around 1800–01 when, on the basis of his "law of similars," he had begun using Ipecacuanha for the treatment of coughs and Belladonna for scarlet fever.

He first published an article about the homeopathic approach in a German-language medical journal in 1796. Following a series of further essays, he published in 1810 "Organon of the Rational Art of Healing", followed over the years by four further editions entitled The Organon of the Healing Art, the first systematic treatise and containing all his detailed instructions on the subject. A 6th Organon edition, unpublished during his lifetime and dating from February 1842, was only published many years after his death. It consisted of a 5th Organon containing extensive handwritten annotations. The Organon is widely regarded as a remodelled form of an essay he published in 1806 called "The Medicine of Experience", which had been published in Hufeland's Journal. Of the Organon, Robert Ellis Dudgeon states it "was an amplification and extension of his "Medicine of Experience", worked up with greater care, and put into a more methodical and aphoristic form, after the model of the Hippocratic writings."

=== Coffee theory of disease ===
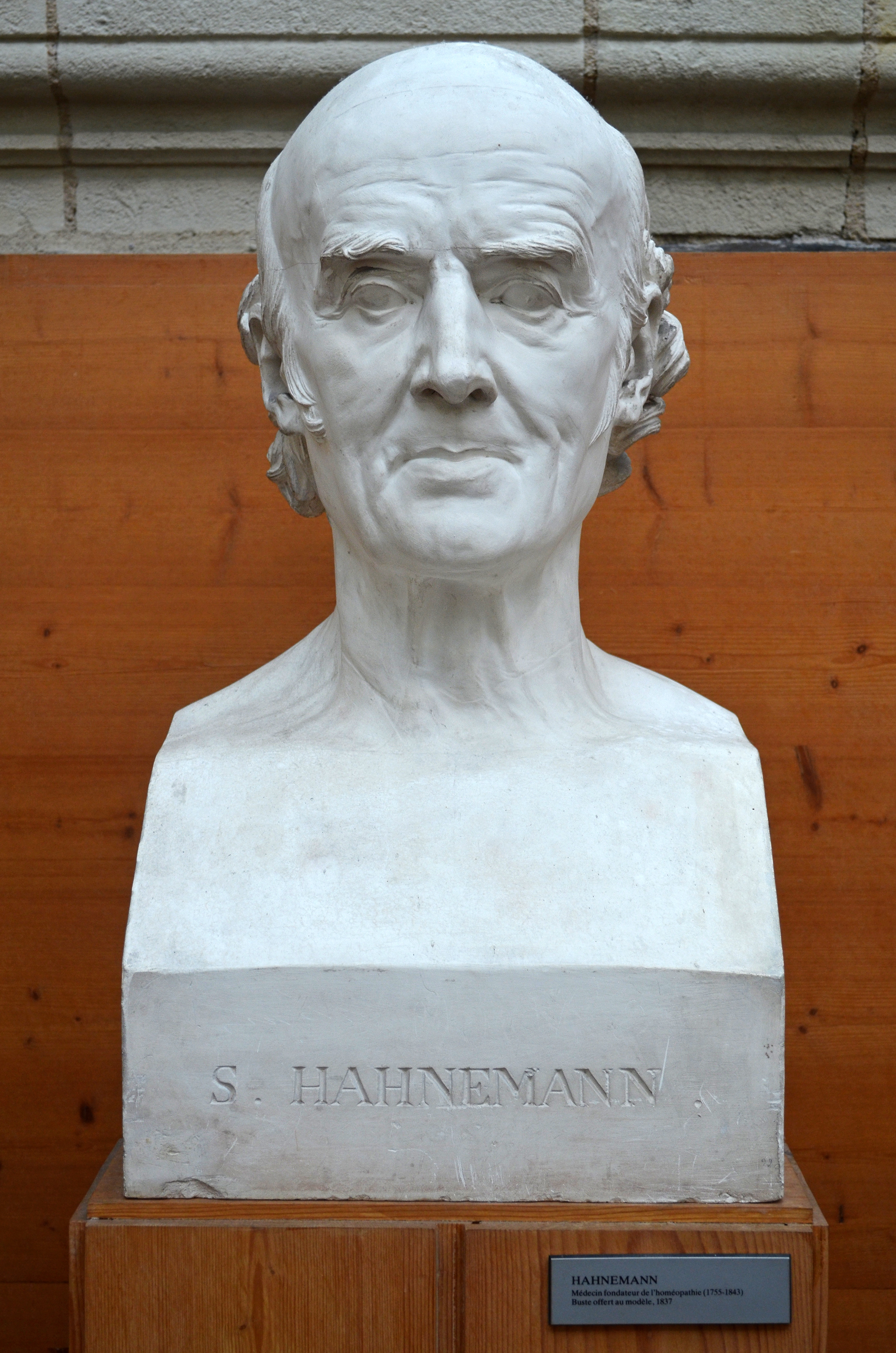
Bust of Samuel Hahnemann by French sculptor David d'Angers (1837)

Around the start of the nineteenth century, Hahnemann developed a theory, propounded in his 1803 essay On the Effects of Coffee from Original Observations, that many diseases are caused by coffee. Hahnemann later abandoned the coffee theory in favour of the theory that disease is caused by Psora, but it has been noted that the list of conditions Hahnemann attributed to coffee was similar to his list of conditions caused by Psora.

== Later life ==
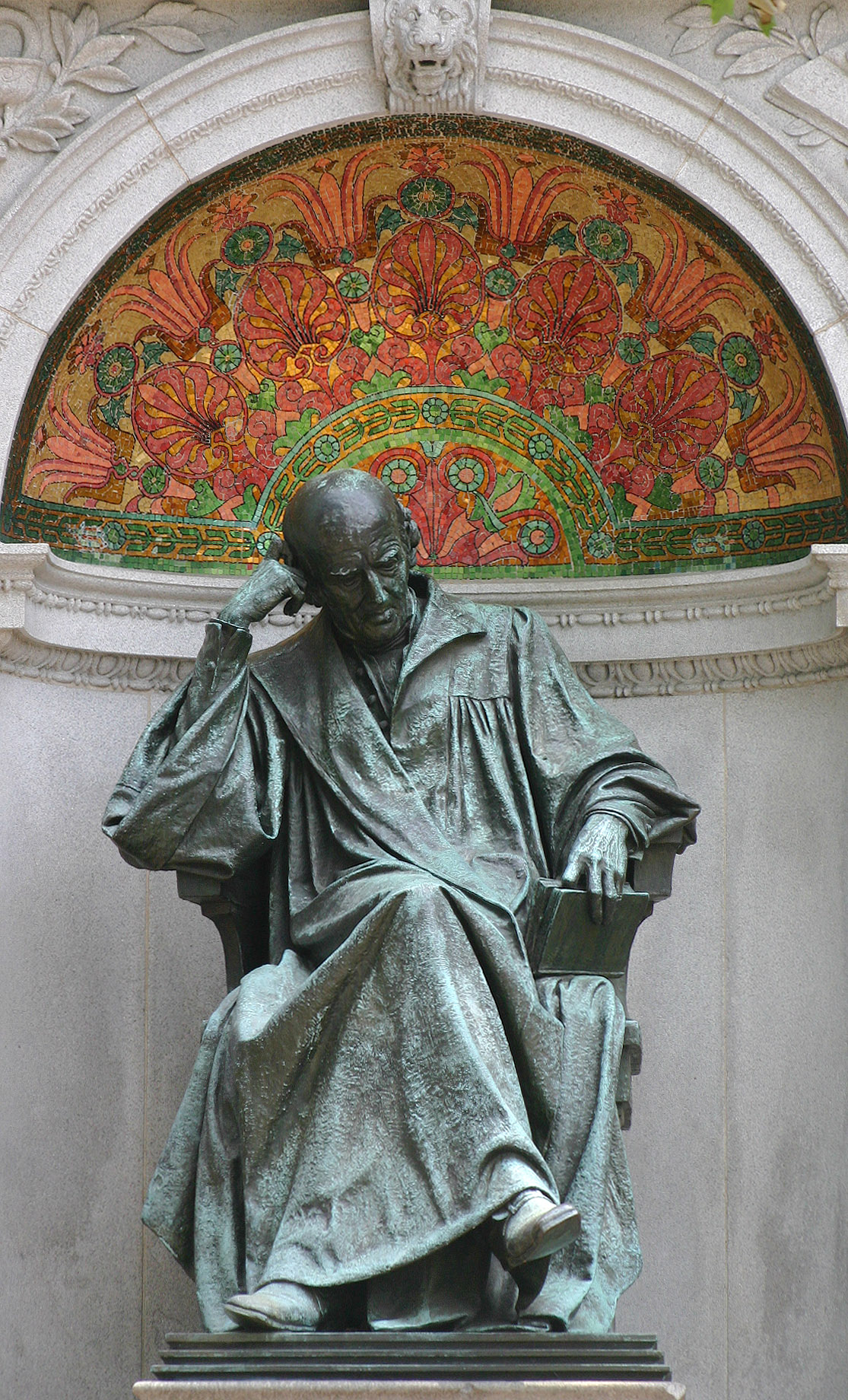
Samuel Hahnemann Monument at Scott Circle, Washington, D.C.

In early 1811 Hahnemann moved his family back to Leipzig with the intention of teaching his new medical system at the University of Leipzig. As required by the university statutes, to become a faculty member he was required to submit and defend a thesis on a medical topic of his choice. On 26 June 1812, Hahnemann presented a Latin thesis, entitled "A Medical Historical Dissertation on the Helleborism of the Ancients." His thesis very thoroughly examined the historical literature and sought to differentiate between the ancient use of Helleborus niger, or black hellebore, and the medicinal uses of the "white hellebore", botanically Veratrum album, both of which are poisonous plants.

Hahnemann continued practicing and researching homeopathy, as well as writing and lecturing for the rest of his life. He died on 2 July 1843 in Paris, at 88 years of age. He was initially buried in Montmartre Cemetery on 11 August 1843 in an unmarked tomb (grave number 8) by his wife, Mélanie and their daughter and grandson.

Later when Mélanie died on 27 May 1878, she too was buried in Montmartre to the left of Hahnemann's in grave number 9 - which were known as Hahnemann's Grave for almost two decades, before these graves were opened on 24 May 1898 and both their remains were moved to where they now lie entombed in a mausoleum at Paris's Père Lachaise Cemetery.

Hahnemann had written an inscription for his own monument on 28 July 1839 - "Non inutilis vixi" (I have not lived in vain). These words in Latin are inscribed on his tomb in Paris and also on the Samuel Hahnemann Monument in Washington, DC which was dedicated in 1900 - even though Hahnemann never visited U.S. in his life.

Hahnemann's 10 April birthday is celebrated annually by the homeopathic community as World Homeopathy Day.

== Descendants ==
Hahnemann's daughter, Amelie (1789–1881), had a son: Leopold Suss-Hahnemann. Leopold emigrated to England, and he practised homeopathy in London. He retired to the Isle of Wight and died there at the outbreak of World War I in 1914. Dr Leopold Suss-Hahnemann's youngest daughter, Amalia, had two children, Winifred (born in 1898) and Herbert. William Herbert Tankard-Hahnemann (1922–2009) was Winifred's son. He served as a Major in the British Army during World War II, and then had a career in the city of London. He was at one point appointed as a Freeman of the City of London. Mr William Herbert Tankard-Hahnemann, the great-great-great-grandson of Samuel Hahnemann died on 12 January 2009 (his 87th birthday) after 22 years of active patronage of the British Institute of Homeopathy. The William Tankard-Hahnemann line continues with his son, Charles.

== Writings ==
Hahnemann wrote a number of books, essays, and letters on the homeopathic method, chemistry, and general medicine:

- Heilkunde der Erfahrung. Norderstedt 2010, ISBN 3-8423-1326-8
- Versuch über ein neues Prinzip zur Auffindung der Heilkräfte der Arzneisubstanzen, nebst einigen Blicken auf die bisherigen [Essay on a New Principle for Ascertaining the Curative Powers of Drugs] (in German). 1796. Archived from the original on 25 April 2014. reprinted in Versuch über ein neues Prinzip zur Auffindung der Heilkräfte der Arzneisubstanzen, nebst einigen Blicken auf die bisherigen. Haug. 1988. ISBN 3-7760-1060-6.
- Fragmenta de viribus medicamentorum positivis sive in sano corpore humano obeservitis, a collection of 27 drug "provings" published in Latin in 1805.
- The Organon of the Healing Art (1810), a detailed delineation of what he saw as the rationale underpinning homeopathic medicine, and guidelines for practice. Hahnemann published the 5th edition in 1833; a revised draft of this (1842) was discovered after Hahnemann's death and finally published as the 6th edition in 1921.
- Materia Medica Pura, a compilation of "homoeopathic proving" reports, published in six volumes between vol. I in 1811 and vol. VI in 1821; second edition of vol. I to Vol. VI from 1822 to 1827 and third revised editions of volumes I and II were published in 1830 and 1833, respectively.
- Chronic Diseases (1828), an explanation of the root and cure of chronic disease according to the theory of miasms, together with a compilation of "homoeopathic proving" reports, published in five volumes during the 1830s.
- The Friend of Health, in which Hahnemann "recommended the use of fresh air, bed rest, proper diet, sunshine, public hygiene and numerous other beneficial measures at a time when many other physicians considered them of no value."
- Appeal to Thinking Philanthropist Respecting the Mode of Propagation of the Asiatic Choler, in which Hahnemann describes cholera physicians and nurses as the "certain and frequent propagators" of cholera and that whilst deriding nurses' "fumigations with chlorine", promoted the use of "drops of camphorated spirit" as a cure for the disease.
- Hahnemann also campaigned for the humane treatment of the insane in 1792.
- John Henry Clarke wrote that "In 1787, Hahnemann discovered the best test for arsenic and other poisons in wine, having pointed out the unreliable nature of the 'Wurtemberg test,' which had been in use up to that date."
- Samuel Hahnemanns Apothekerlexikon. Vol.2. Crusius, Leipzig 1798–1799 Digital edition by the University and State Library Düsseldorf
- Reine Arzneimittellehre. Arnold, Dresden (several editions) 1822–1827 Digital edition by the University and State Library Düsseldorf
- Systematische Darstellung der reinen Arzneiwirkungen aller bisher geprüften Mittel. Vieweg, Braunschweig 1831 – Digital edition by the University and State Library Düsseldorf

== See also ==
- Hahnemann University Hospital
- Samuel Hahnemann Monument
