= Arnold Baumgarten =

- Born: Arnold Baumgarten; 24 September 1879; Vienna
- Died: 23 January 1939 (aged 59); Canton
- Education: University of Vienna
- Occupations: Doctor, hospital director
- Known for: Director of Krankenhaus Lainz, fled Nazi persecution to China
- Medical career
- Institutions: Rudolfstiftung Hospital; Karolinen-Kinderspital, Krankenhaus Lainz
- Awards: Red Cross Medal of Honor (1916)

Arnold Baumgarten (24 September 1879 – 23 January 1939) was a part Jewish doctor and hospital director in Vienna who fled to China after Austria's Anschluss from Nazi Germany.

== Early life ==
Arnold Baumgarten was born in Vienna on 24 September 1879, the son of the merchant Johann Jakob Baumgarten and Mathilde, née Kollinsky. In 1907 he was married Johanna (born 6 May 1879 Brünn/Mähren), née Horvath. They had the two sons Johann (born 28 September 1907 in Pörtschach) and Friedrich Robert (born 10 July 1910 in Pörtschach), who studied medicine at the University of Vienna and received his doctorate in 1936.

== Career ==
After further training, Baumgarten worked as assistant at the prosectura of the Rudolfstiftung Hospital with the pathologist Prof. Richard Paltauf (1858-1924). In 1904, he published the paper "„Ein Beitrag zur Pathogenität des Bazillus Friedländer und zur Histogenese der Mikulicz´schen Zellen“ ("A Contribution to the Pathogenicity of the Bacillus Friedländer and to the Histogenesis of Mikulicz's Cells"). Until 1907, he practiced medicine at the Karolinen-Kinderspital at Sobieskigasse 31 in Vienna 9 with the lecturer and later professor Wilhelm Knoepfelmacher (1866-1938), where he published "A Case of Peripheral Unilateral Hypoglossal Palsy with Hemiatrophy of the Tongue." In 1906 he became member of the Society of Internal Medicine and Pediatrics, and the Society of Pediatrics, in Vienna.

In early 1908 he was appointed provisional community physician in Annaberg in the district of Lilienfeld in Lower Austria, and then in the same year in Pörtschach am Wörthersee in Carinthia as community physician and physician of the health resort. In 1911, he was appointed medical officer in the state of Carinthia, from which position he resigned as early as 1912.

He served in World War 1 as a senior physician at the Pörtschach Reserve Hospital, and from 1915 as a naval medical officer for the Naval Supplementary District in Trieste at the Military Hospital in Knittelfeld.[6] In 1915, he was appointed Landsturm assistant physician, and in 1916 Landsturm senior physician. In 1916 he also received the Red Cross Medal of Honour in recognition of services to the founding of district hospitals and to the voluntary rescue service.[9] As a physician at the military hospital in Knittelfeld, he published a series of papers from the hospital's bacteriological laboratory in 1917, as well as collaborating on scientific papers with the bacteriologist Helene Langer-Zuckerkandl (1888-1944) and Alfred Luger (1886-1938).

Baumgarten was the director of Vienna's largest city hospital (1,000 beds) and the head of the Austrian State health department. From 1923 to 1938 he was the Director of the "Krankenhaus Lainz" in Wien

In early 1938 he joined the Verein für Geschichte der Stadt Wien as a member, and in January 1938 he was decorated by the mayor of the city of Vienna.

== Nazi persecution and flight ==
After Austria merged with Nazi Germany in the 1938 "Anschluss", Baumgarten was persecuted because of his Jewish heritage.

One day after the Anschluss, on 14 March 1938, the Nazis removed him from his positions at the Lainz Hospital (Vienna 13, Woltersbergenstraße 1), forcing him into permanent retirement on 23 April 1938.

Baumgarten fled to China in October 1938. He died on 23 January 1939 in Canton in China; his wife Johanna, who was not Jewish, died in Vienna in March 1940. His son Fritz, who had studied medicine at the University of Vienna and received his doctorate in 1936, fled to Tianjin (formerly Tientsin) in China, where he died.[23] His second son Johann Baumgartner managed to escape to Paraguay.

== Time Magazine report of suicide ==
Time Magazine included Baumgarted in a list of reported post-Anschluss suicides of Jewish doctors in Vienna in a 28 March 1938 article entitled, "Medicine: Death & Doctors". The article focused on the impact of the Nazis taking possession of " the world's greatest establishment for medical teaching—the University of Vienna's medical school (300 professors & lecturers), the General Hospital (over 2,000 beds), the polyclinic and nine other hospitals."

Time included Baumgarten in a list of suicides, not knowing that he had managed to flee to China. The Time list included:

Professor Gabor Nobl, 74, Polyclinic skin & syphilis specialist, who shot his wife and himself.

Professor Edmund Nobel, 54, baby specialist, who with the help of U. S. charity fed 400,000 Austrian children starving after the last War.

Professor Arnold Baumgarten, 58, part-Jewish director of Vienna's largest city hospital (1,000 beds), onetime head of the Austrian State health department.

Professor Moritz Oppenheim, 61, best skin specialist in Vienna.

Professor Jonas Borak, X-ray specialist.

Professor Gustav Bayer, 69, who with his daughter took morphine, turned on the gas and died in his home at Innsbruck.

== See also ==
- The Holocaust in Austria

(not to be confused with another Holocaust victim of the same name)
