= Leipzig Christmas Market =

Seasonal market in Leipzig, Germany

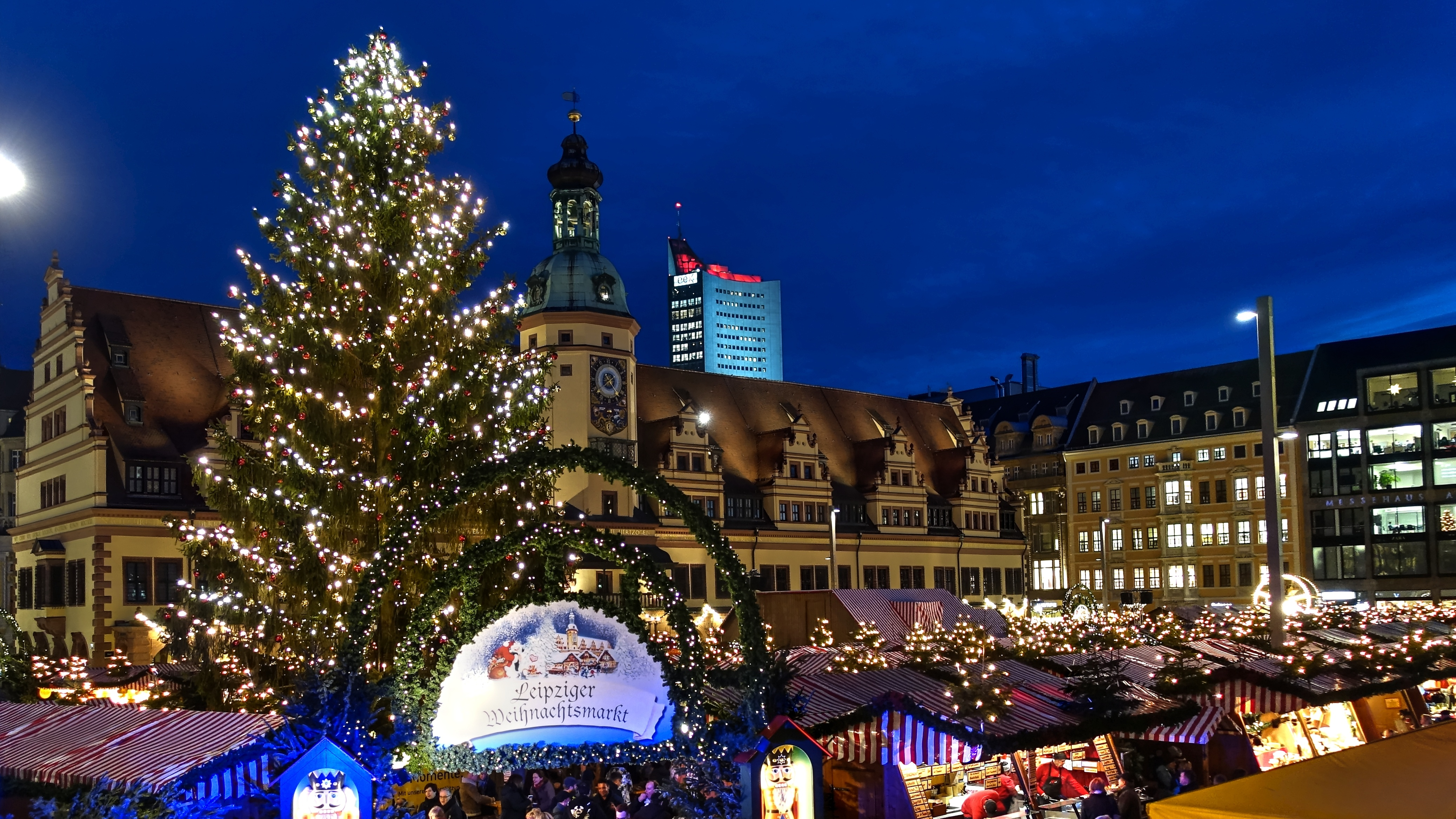
View at blue hour over Leipzig's market square and the Old Town Hall (2019)

The Leipzig Christmas Market (in German: Leipziger Weihnachtsmarkt) is one of the oldest Christmas markets in Germany. It takes place annually from the end of November to 23 December on Leipzig's market square and the adjacent streets and, with around 300 stalls and over 2.8 million visitors (2019), is one of the largest Christmas markets in Germany.

== History ==
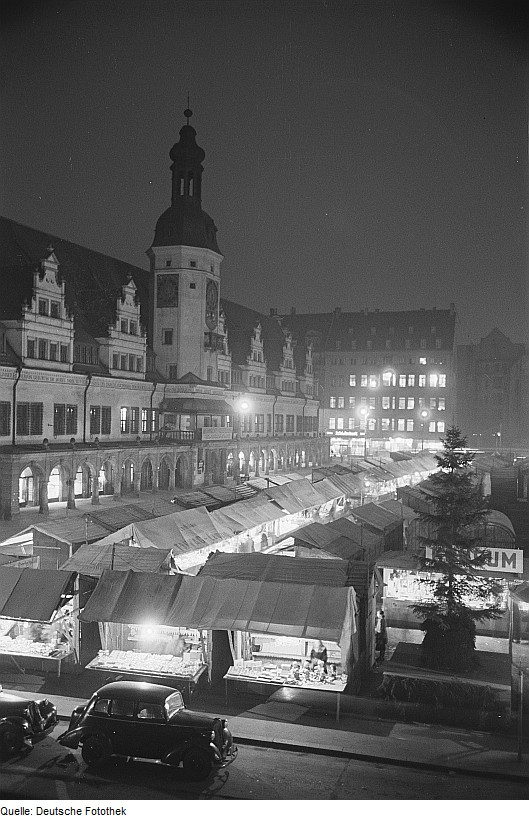
Leipzig Christmas Market (1950)

Its history goes back to 1458. In notes by Johann Jacob Vogel from 1714 there is the note:

"Anno 1458. Frederick II, Elector of Saxony, Marggraff of Meissen and Hertzog of Saxony / publicly advertised the Weynachtsmarckt / and the city / because of the loyal service rendered / as shown to him by the council / and the citizens / thus pardoned."

This makes it one of the oldest Christmas markets in Germany, alongside the Munich Christmas Market (1310), Bautzen Wenzelsmarkt (1384), Frankfurt Christmas Market (1393) and Dresden Striezelmarkt (1434).

The Christmas markets planned for 2020 and 2021 were canceled due to the COVID-19 pandemic.

== Program of supporting events ==
The Leipzig Christmas Market 2023 will be opened by the cultural mayor Skadi Jennicke, the Thomanerchor and the Leipzig Youth & Wind Orchestra. Every day at 6 p.m., tower brass players traditionally play from the balcony of the Old Town Hall. Further concerts take place on the market stage. The Ore Mountains Miners' parade is a procession of a brass band with seven miners' bands with 265 mountain musicians and around 370 people in uniform and takes place every two years.

== Attractions ==
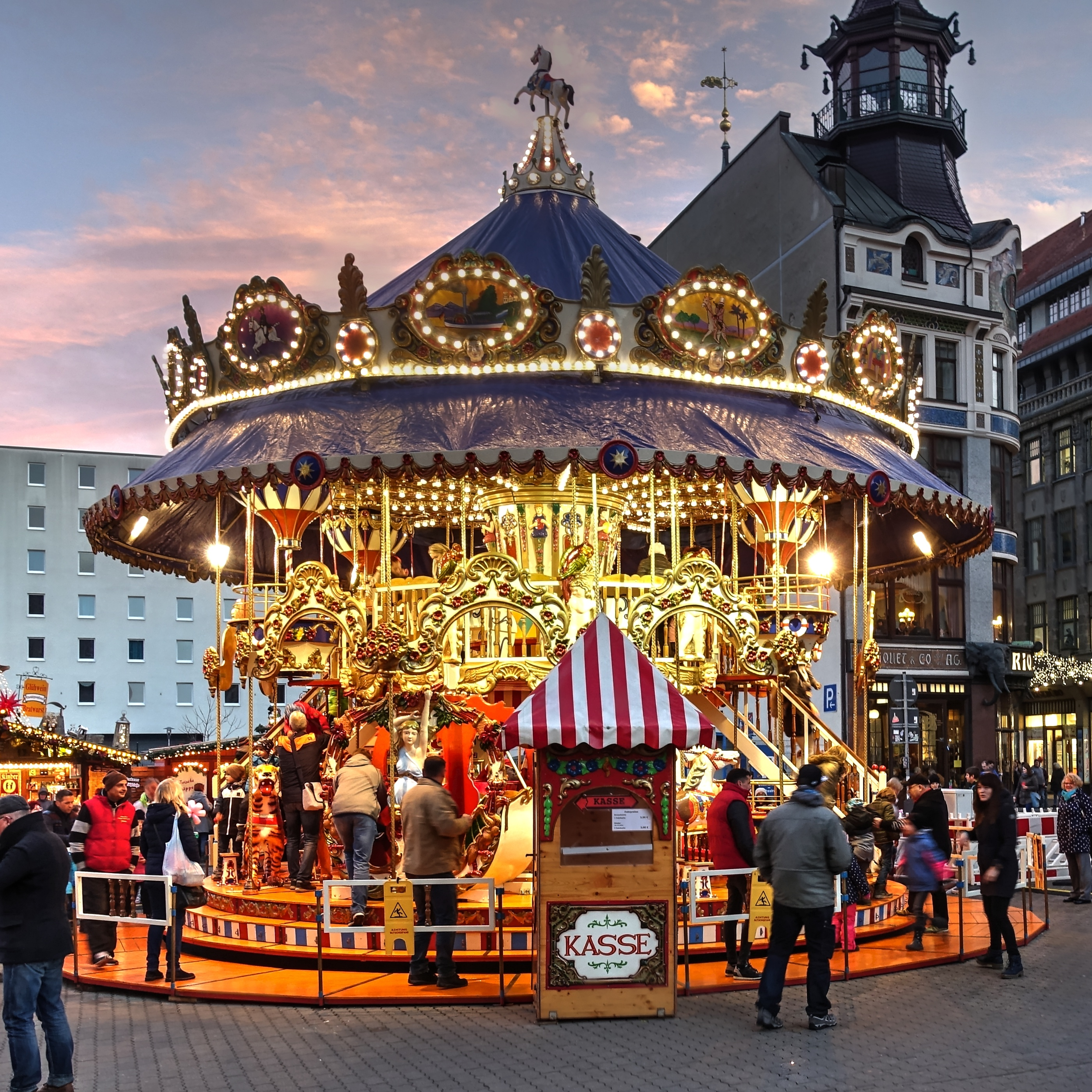
Floor carousel rebuilt based on the historical original (2019)

The market offers several areas, including a fairytale land for children on Augustusplatz, a historical market on Naschmarkt, a nativity scene with real sheep, an 8 metres (26 ft) tall Ore Mountains Christmas pyramid on Nikolaikirchhof and a Finnish village on Augustusplatz. On the market square there is the approximately 20 metres (66 ft) tall Christmas fir, usually a spruce from the region.

The South Tyrolean village is a popular meeting point on Augustusplatz during the Leipzig Christmas market. Tyrolean dishes are served while listening to Alpine music.

The historic carousel is a special attraction of the Christmas market on Salzgässchen. The carousel, parts of which were over 100 years old, fell victim to a fire due to a short circuit before the market opened in November 2009. In 2010 the carousel was rebuilt true to the original. The “Wichtelwerkstatt” where children can do crafts has existed since 2010 and was completely renovated and reopened in 2017.

A special and widely celebrated Leipzig tradition is the arrival of Santa Claus in the city. Every year on the Saturday before the Advent Sunday at 11 a.m., numerous children and their parents welcome Santa Claus and his entourage at the main station, where he arrives on a special train. They then escort his carriage and brass band across the city to the market square. Santa Claus will hold his office hours there every day until the end of the Christmas market.

Another attraction at the Christmas market was the largest free-standing Advent calendar in the world, which was installed from 1997 to 2012 and, at 857 square metres (9,225 sq ft), according to the Guinness Book of Records, was on the facade of a house in Böttchergässchen with 3 metres (10 ft) by 2 metres (7 ft) windows. It was played by students from Leipzig schools and the ″Musikschule Leipzig Johann Sebastian Bach". Due to damage caused by vandalism, the calendar was no longer installed in 2013.

== Offer ==
Around a third of the stands offer baked goods and confectionery such as roasted almonds, Pulsnitzer gingerbread or Stollen, as well as other food and drinks. The largest proportion are high-quality dealers, showmen and craftsmen. Among other things, wood carvings from Ore Mountain folk art and other handicrafts are on offer.

== Images ==
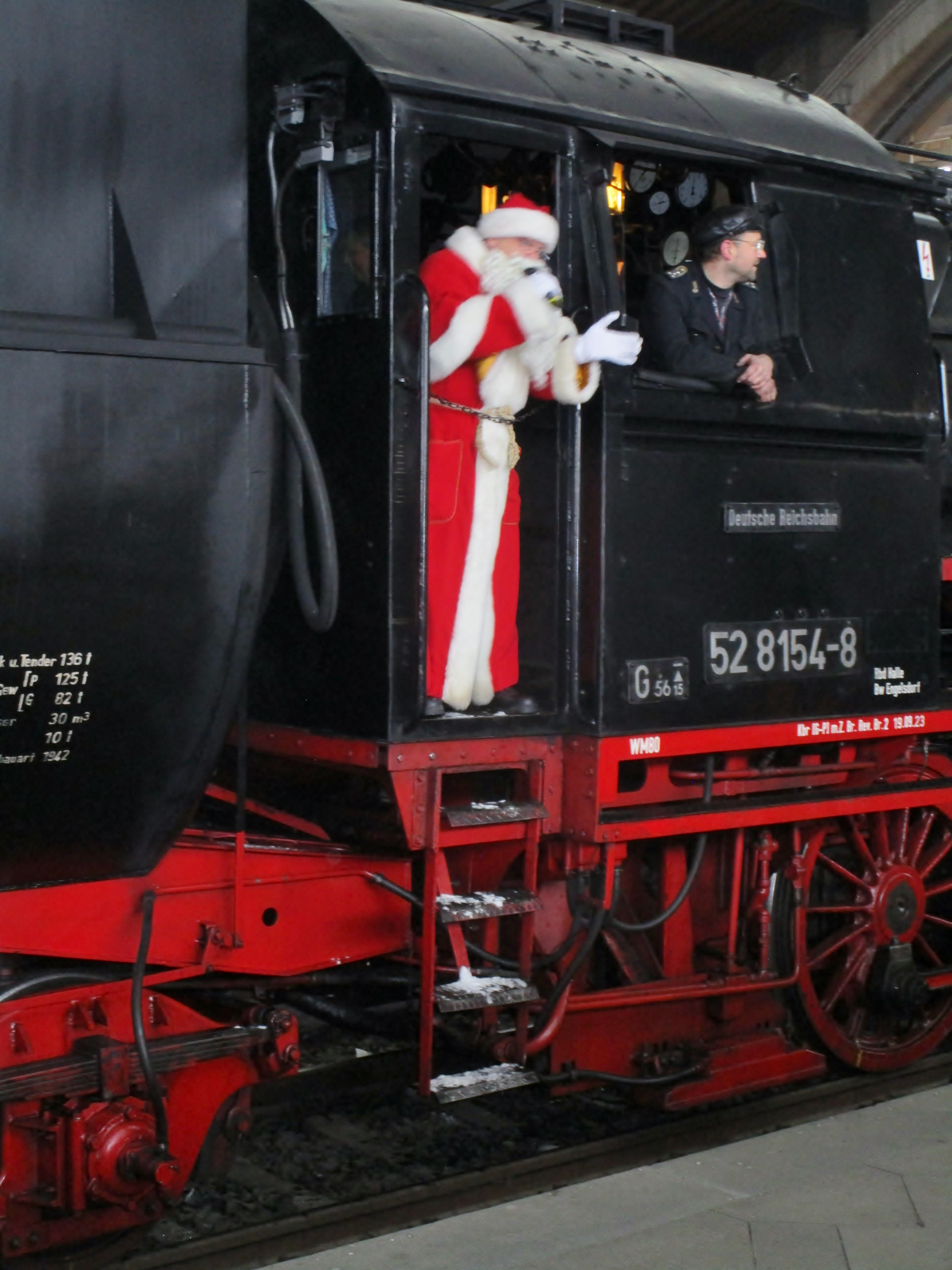
Arrival of Santa Claus (2023)

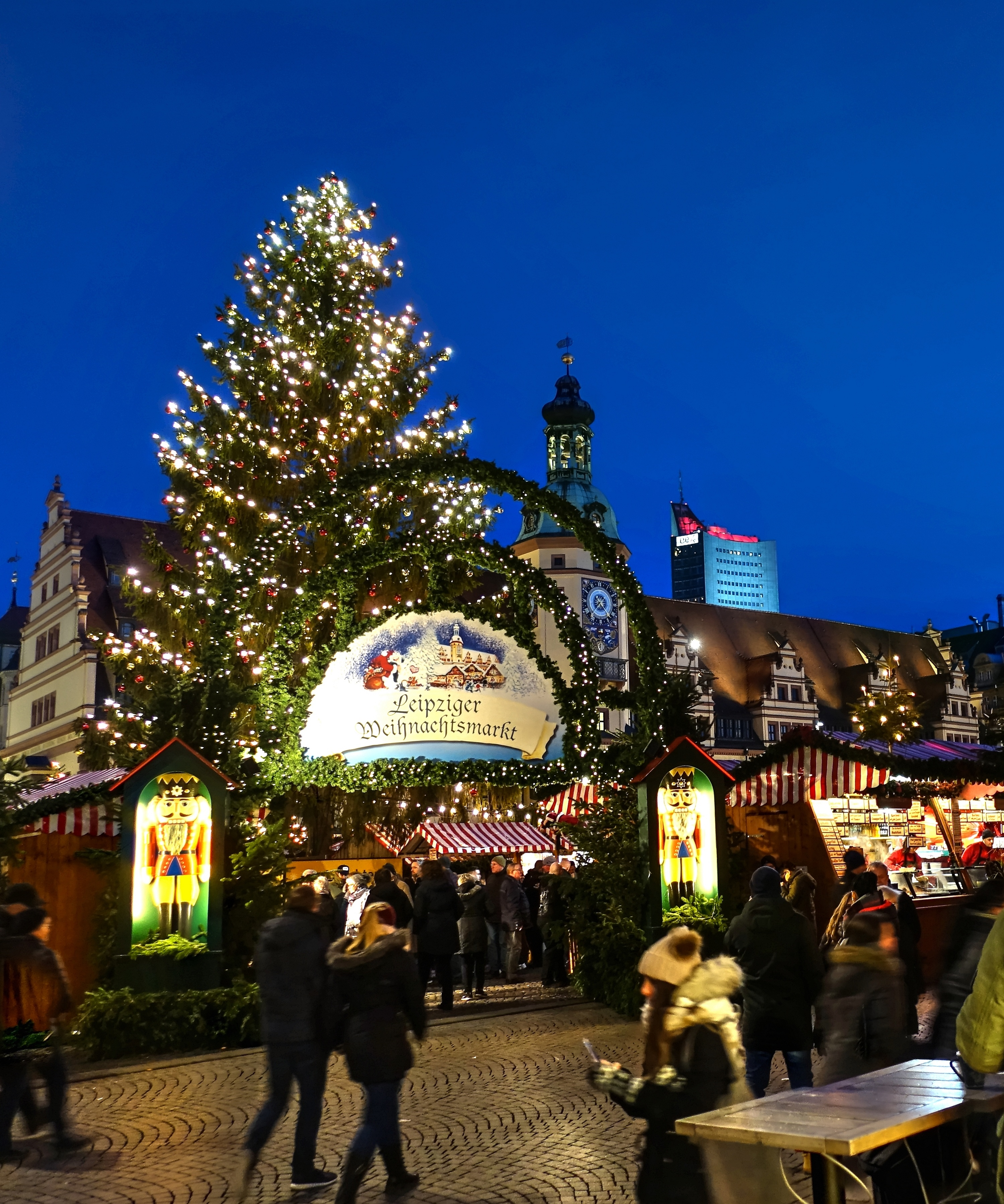
Entrance to the Christmas Market from the northwest corner of the market place

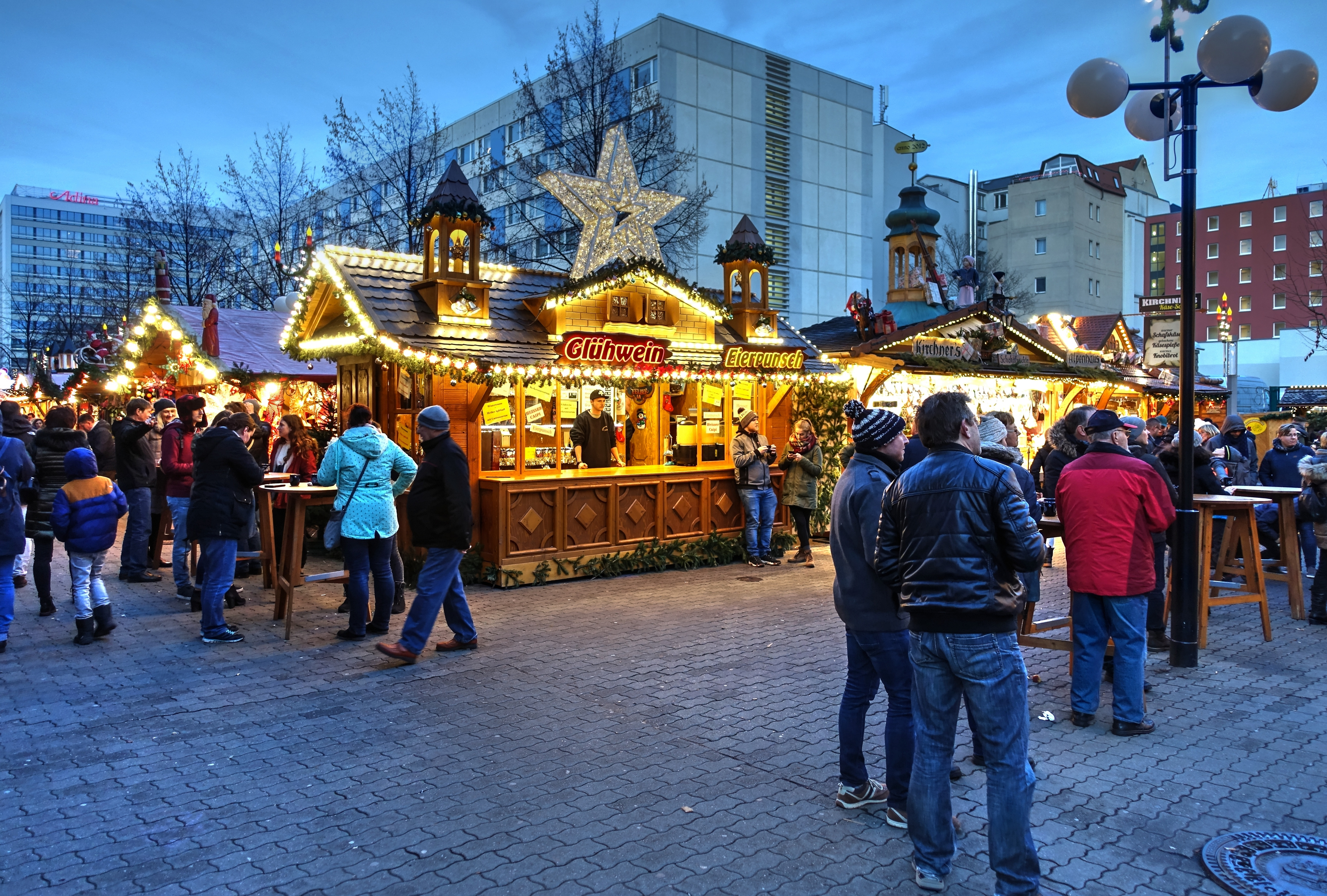
Mulled wine stand on Reichsstrasse at the corner of Salzgässchen

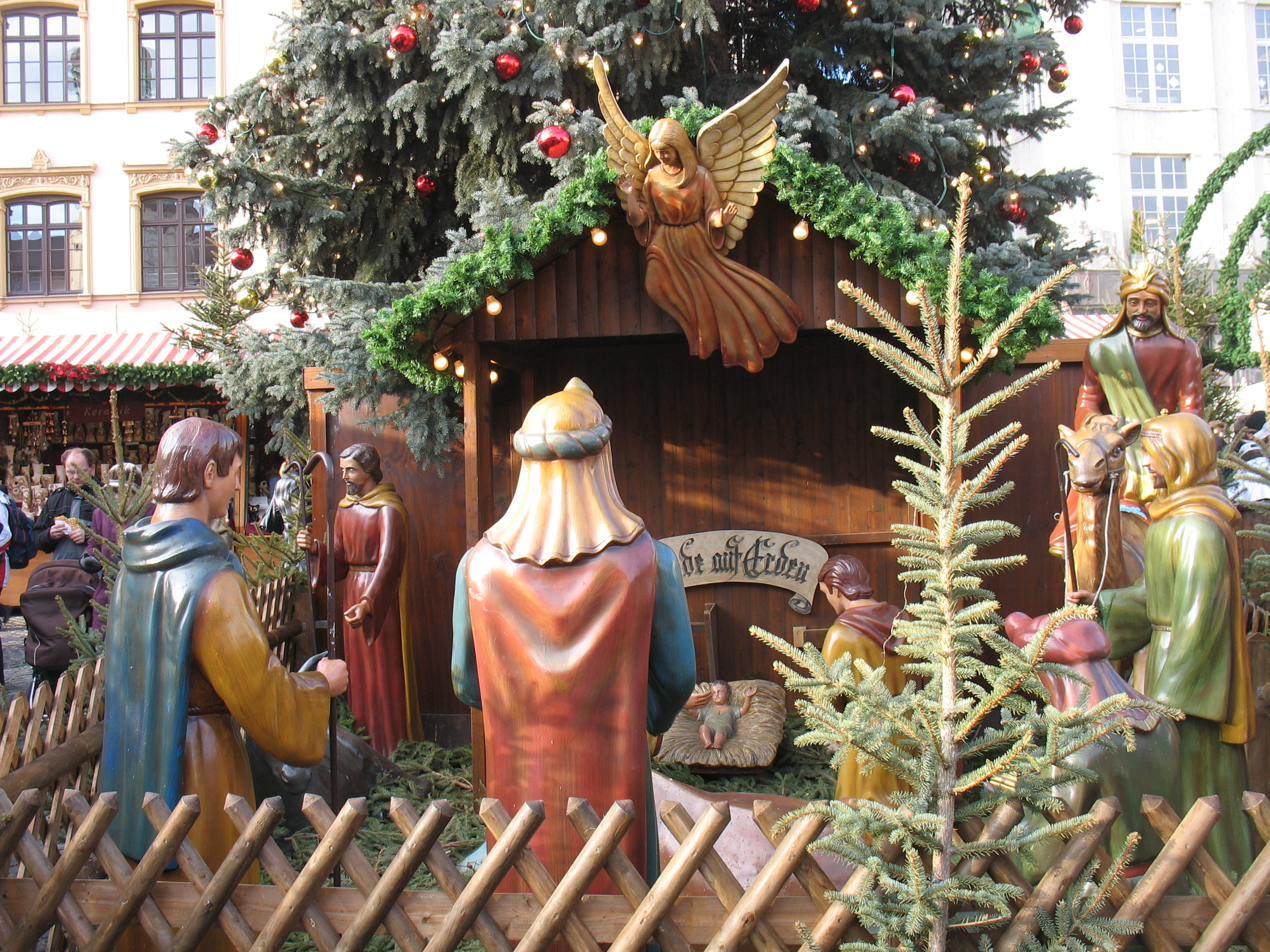
Leipzig Christmas nativity scene

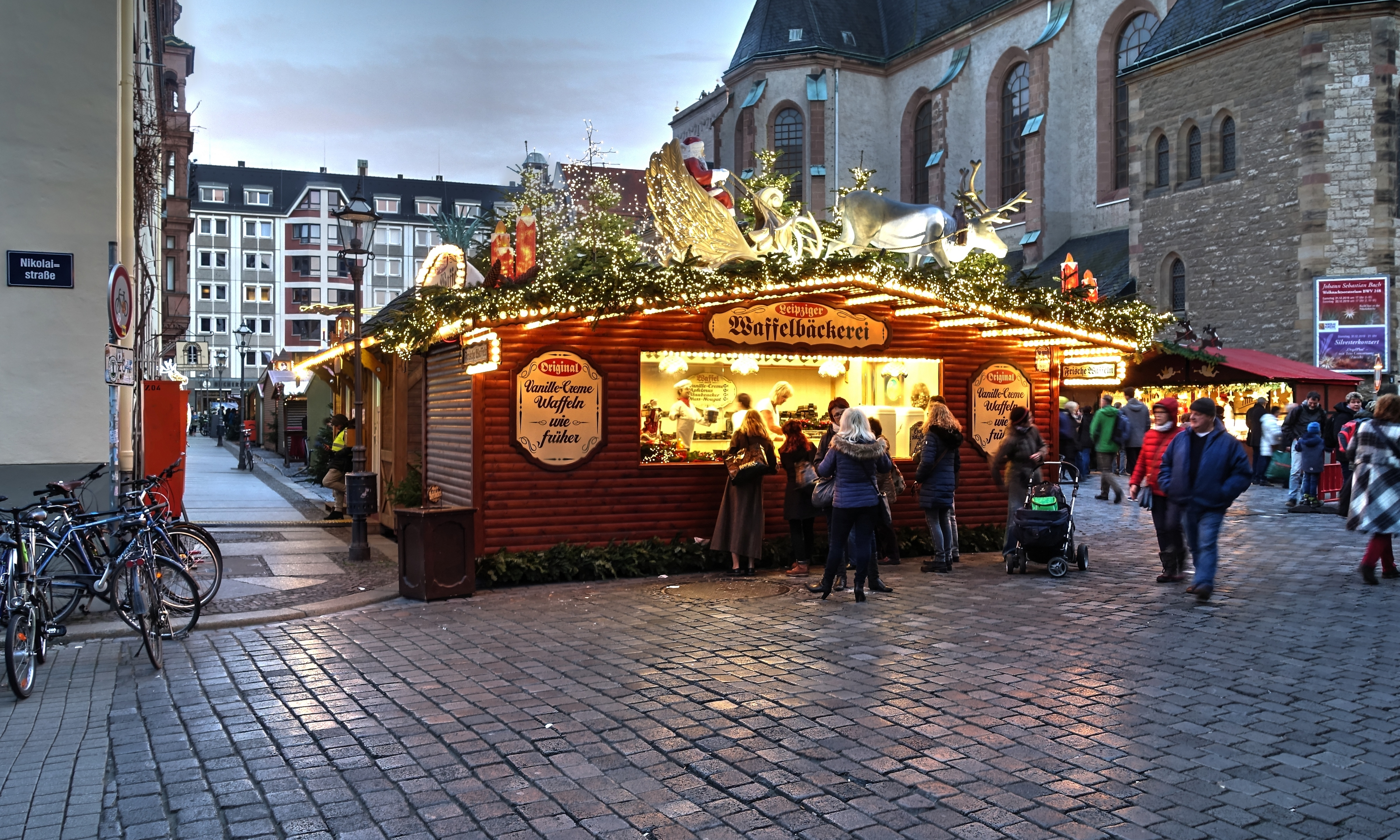
Waffle bakery on the Nikolaikirchhof corner of Nikolaistrasse

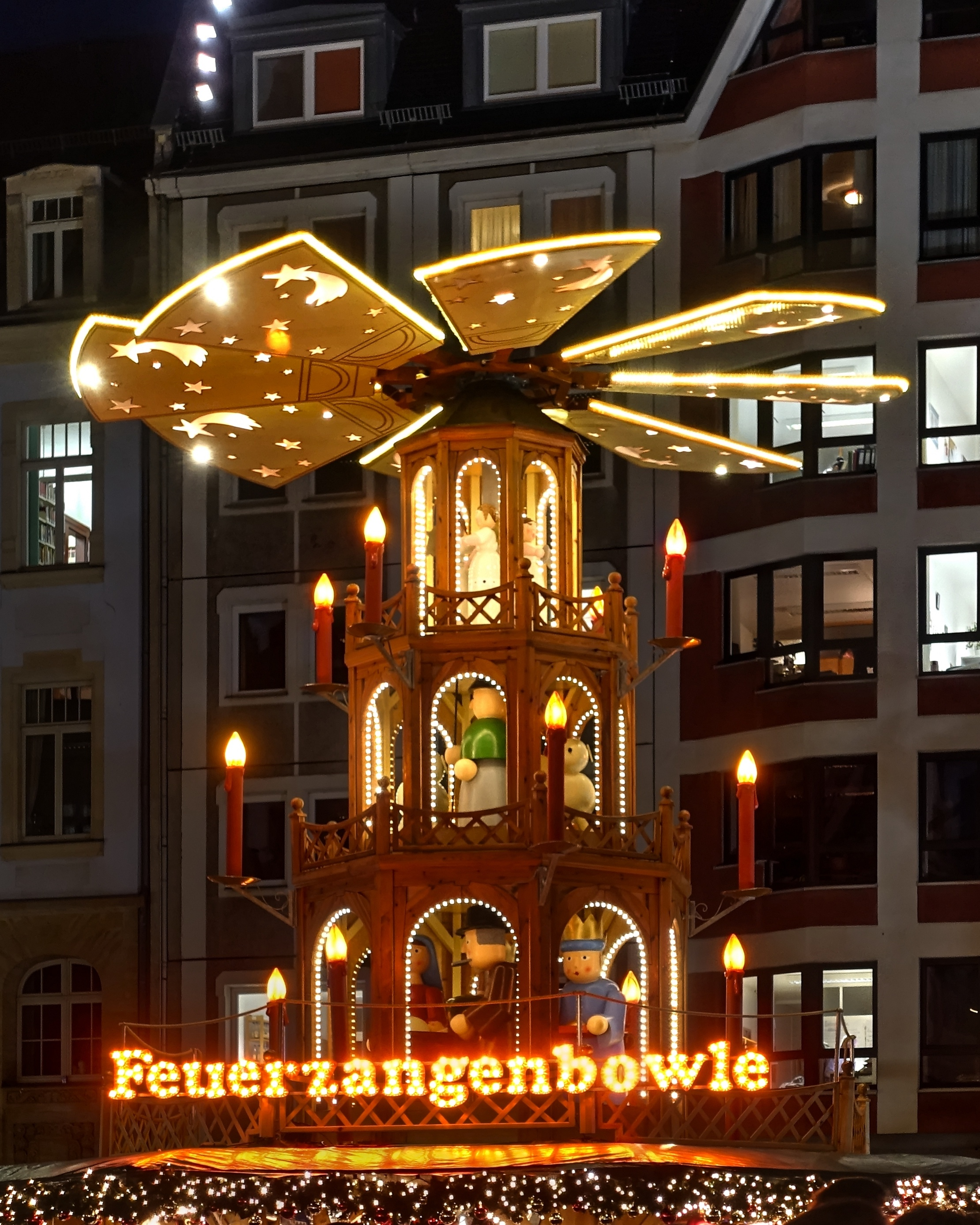
Christmas pyramid at the Feuerzangenbowle stand in Nikolaikirchhof

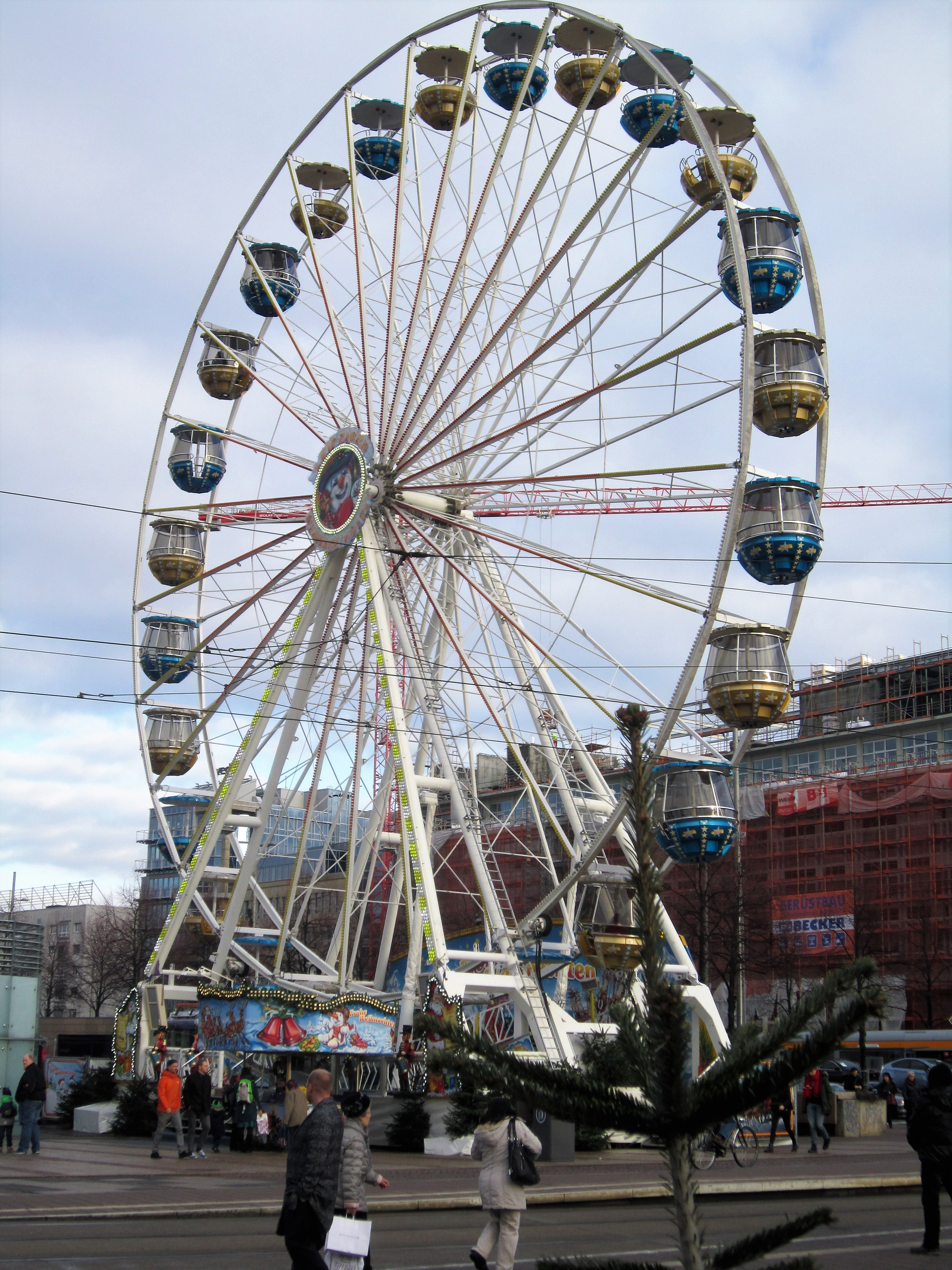
Ferris wheel on Augustusplatz (2017)
