= Jacobus Theodorus Tabernaemontanus =

Jacobus Theo Tabernaemontanus
- Jakob Dietrich
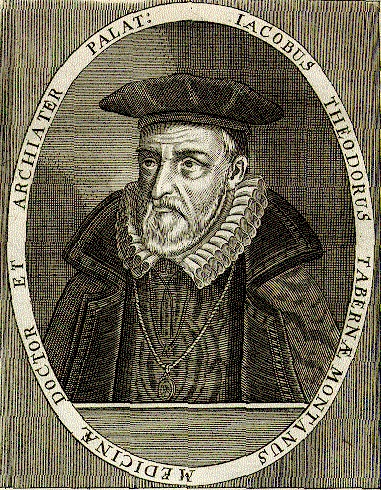
- Born: 1522/1525
- Died: August 1590 (aged 67–68)
- Known for: Physician, botanist, and herbalist

Jacobus Theodorus known as Tabernaemontanus (né Jacob Dietrich; died August 1590) was a physician and an early botanist and herbalist, one of the "fathers of German botany" whose illustrated Neuw Kreuterbuch (Frankfurt, 1588) was the result of a lifetime's botanizing and medical practice. It provided unacknowledged material for John Gerard's better-known Herball (London, 1597) and was reprinted in Germany throughout the 17th century. His Latinised name is a compressed form of the Latinized name Tabernae Montanae of his home town of Bergzabern in the Palatinate. Tabernaemontanus began as a student of two of the pioneers of Renaissance botany, first of Otto Brunfels and later of Hieronymus Bock.

By a series of places as court physician to German nobles. In 1549 he was the private physician to Philip II, Count of Nassau-Saarbrücken and later (from 1561 on) to Marquard von Hattstein, bishop of Speyer. Later he also served as city physician (Stadtarzt) to the free imperial city of Worms, Germany. Johannes Posthius and William Turner (Bad Bergzabern) were friends of Tabernaemontanus.

In 1562, Tabernaemontanus enrolled as a student at Heidelberg University. In the same city he spent the last decades of his life as physician to his liege lord, the Prince-Elector. He died in Heidelberg, having been three times married and the father of eighteen children. He is commemorated in the pan-tropical genus of flowering shrubs and small trees Tabernaemontana; the French botanist Charles Plumier erected the genus, as a compliment to Tabernaemontanus, and it was adopted by Linnaeus.

== Works ==
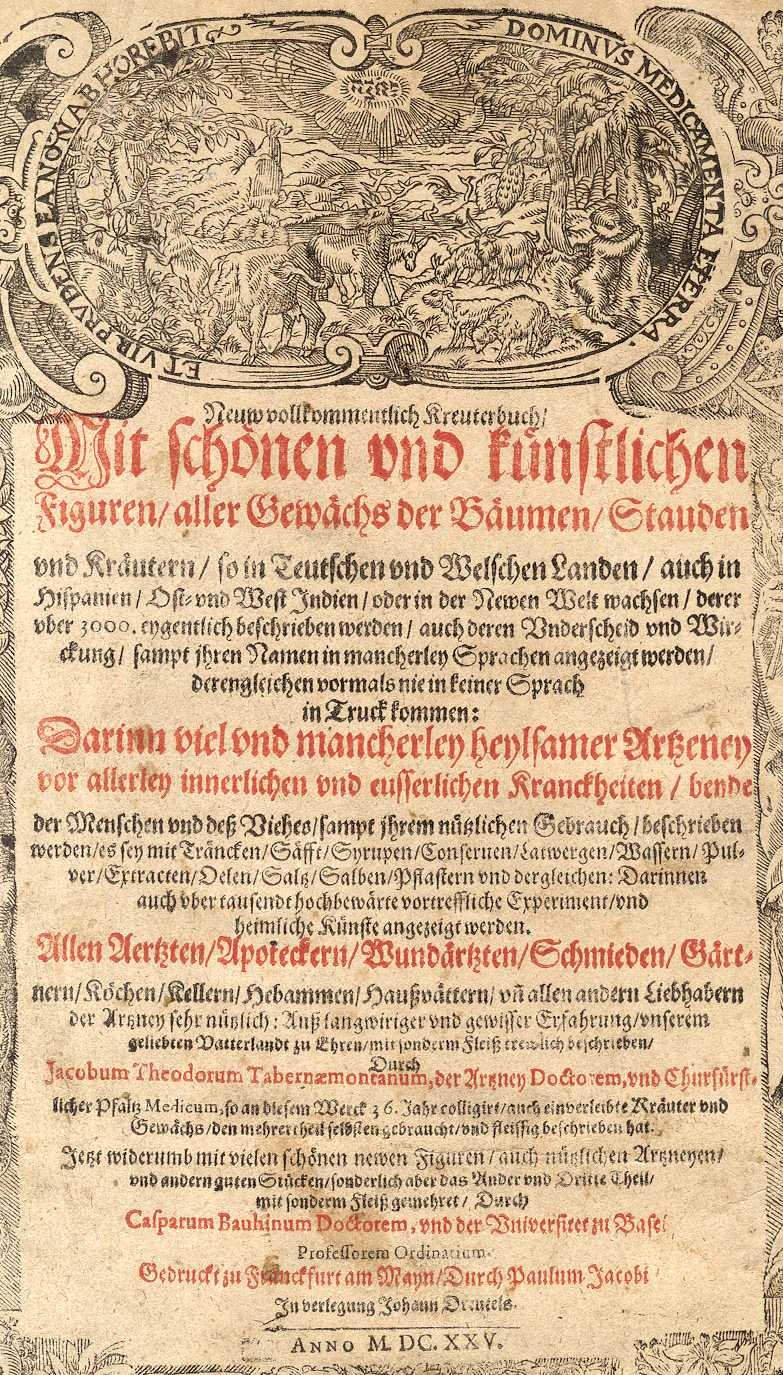
Title page of the Basel, 1625 edition

- Neuw Wasserschatz (1581)
- Neuw Kreuterbuch part 1 (Frankfurt, 1588), part 2 & 3 (Frankfurt, 1591) the first edition of the masterwork on which his posthumous reputation is based. Digital edition (vol. 2; 1687 ed.) of the European Library of Information and Culture.
- Eicones plantarum seu stirpium (Frankfurt, 1590) the illustrations of Neuw Kreuterbuch, 2255 woodcuts of plants, without the text.
- Iacobi Theodori Tabernaemontani New vollkommen Kräuter-Buch : darinnen uber 3000 Kräuter, mit schönen und kunstlichen Figuren, auch deren Unterscheid und Wirckung, sampt ihren Namen in mancherley Spraachen beschrieben, deßgleichen auch, wie dieselbige in allerhand Kranckheiten, beyde der Menschen und des Viehs, sollen angewendet und gebraucht werden, angezeigt wird. Theodorus, Jacobus. Basel : König / Werenfels, 1664. Digital edition of the University and State Library Düsseldorf.
- Jacobi Theodori Tabernæmontani Neü vollkommen Kräuter-Buch : Darinnen Uber 3000. Kräuter/ mit schönen und kunstlichen Figuren/ auch deren Underscheid und Würckung/ sam̄t ihren Namen in mancherley Sprachen beschrieben; Deßgleichen auch/ wie dieselbige in allerhand Kranckheiten/ beyde der Menschen und des Viehs/ sollen angewendet und gebraucht werden/ angezeigt wird. Basel; Offenbach am Mäyn : König, 1731. Digital edition of the University and State Library Düsseldorf.

== Sources ==
- Wolf-Dieter Müller-Jahncke / Ulrike Bofinger (2003): Apotheker, Arzt und Fachschriftsteller: Jakob Theodor, genannt Tabernaemontanus (1522-1590) aus Bergzabern. Rosarium literarum, Beiträge zur Pharmazie- und Wissenschaftsgeschichte.
- Hans Gerhard Christoph (1998): Sonderpublikation Saarland-Museum / Saarbrücken, 475. Geburtstag des Botanikers Prof. Jacob Theodor namens Tabernaemontanus. 1. August - 1. November 1998 exhibition.
- Karl Mägdefrau (1998): Geschichte der Botanik 2. edition
