= Konrad Knoll =

German sculptor (1829–1899)

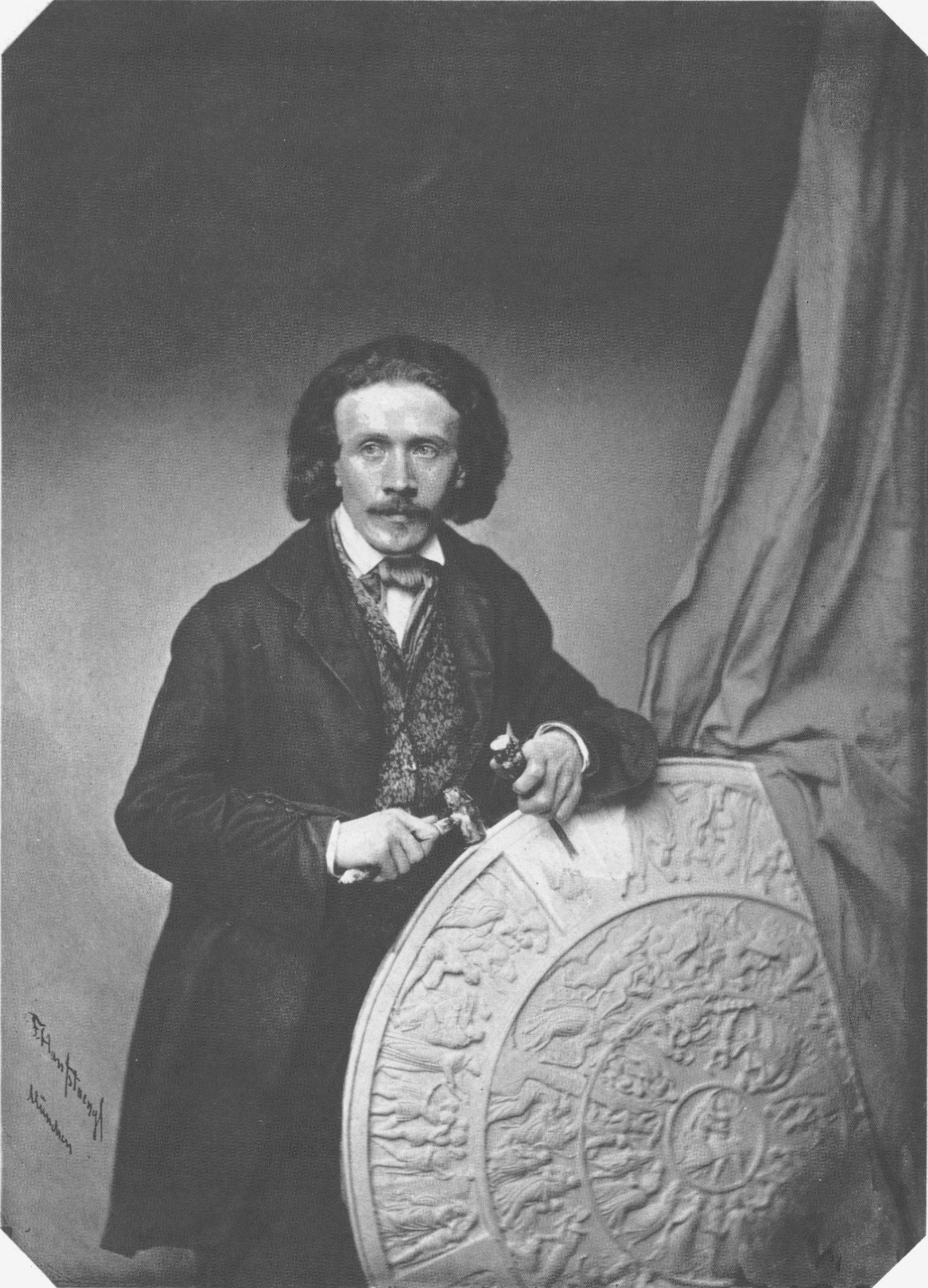
Konrad Knoll, ca. 1860

Konrad Knoll (9 September 1829 – 14 June 1899) was a German sculptor.

Born in Bad Bergzabern, Konrad Knoll studied first under the renowned sculptor and priest Bernhard Würschmitt, before travelling in 1845 to Karlsruhe and Stuttgart, and then to Munich under Halbig, attending the academy from 1848 to 1852.

His first works were the Tannhäuserschild (1856) and a statue of Wolfram von Eschenbach for the poet's birthplace in the form of a fountain. In 1860 he created a model of a statue of Sappho, which he later rendered in marble for King Ludwig II of Bavaria. In the next two years, he created colossal statues of Henry the Lion and Ludwig of Bavaria at the Old Town Hall of Munich. Immediately after the completion of these statues Knoll began working on the Fischbrunnen in front of the New Town Hall (1865). At this time Knoll also created the model for the monument to Johann Philipp Palm in Braunau am Inn, which, like the fountain, was cast in bronze by Ferdinand von Miller.

From the period immediately afterwards came a life-size group: St. Elizabeth with her three children at the Wartburg, and in 1868 a bust of the historian Ludwig Häusser for the cemetery in Heidelberg. It was followed by a bust of Ludwig van Beethoven, the monument to Melchior Meyr in Nördlingen and a bust of the German Emperor.

Knoll was a professor at the Technical University of Munich.

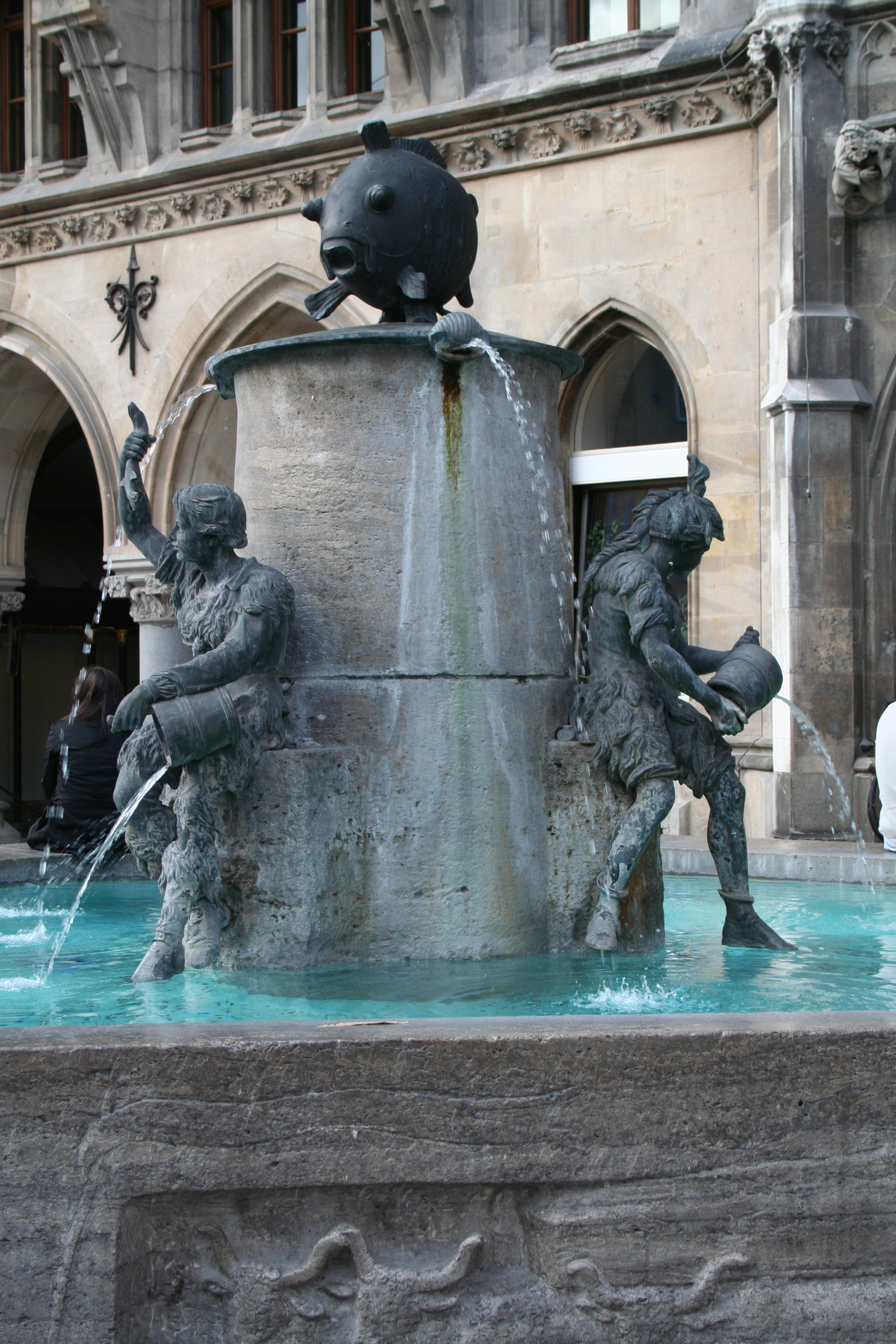
Fischbrunnen

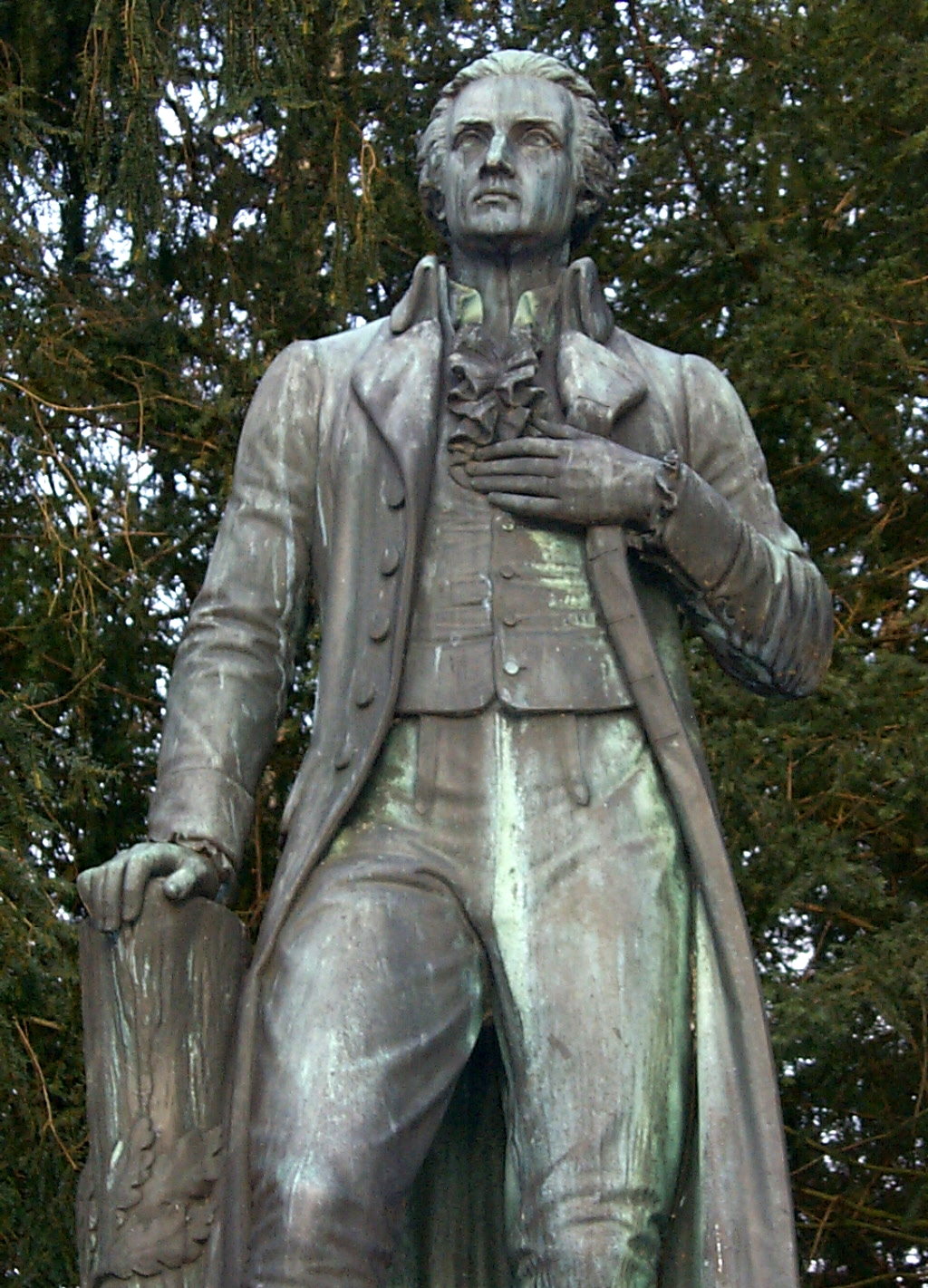
Johann Philipp Palm
