= Fischbrunnen =

Fountain in Munich, Germany

- Location: Marienplatz, Munich, Germany
- Coordinates: 48°08′14″N 11°34′34″E
- Designer: Konrad Knoll (1862-1865, original design); Josef Henselmann (1954, present form)
- Type: Fountain
- Material: Nagelfluh basin, Bronze sculptures
- Beginning date: 1318 (earliest mention of a fountain at the location)
- Completion date: 1954 (present form)
- Restored date: 1991, 2011
- Dedicated to: (Commemorates fishmongers and butcher's guild traditions)
- Notable Traditions: Metzgersprung (Butcher's Jump), Wallet washing (by mayor)

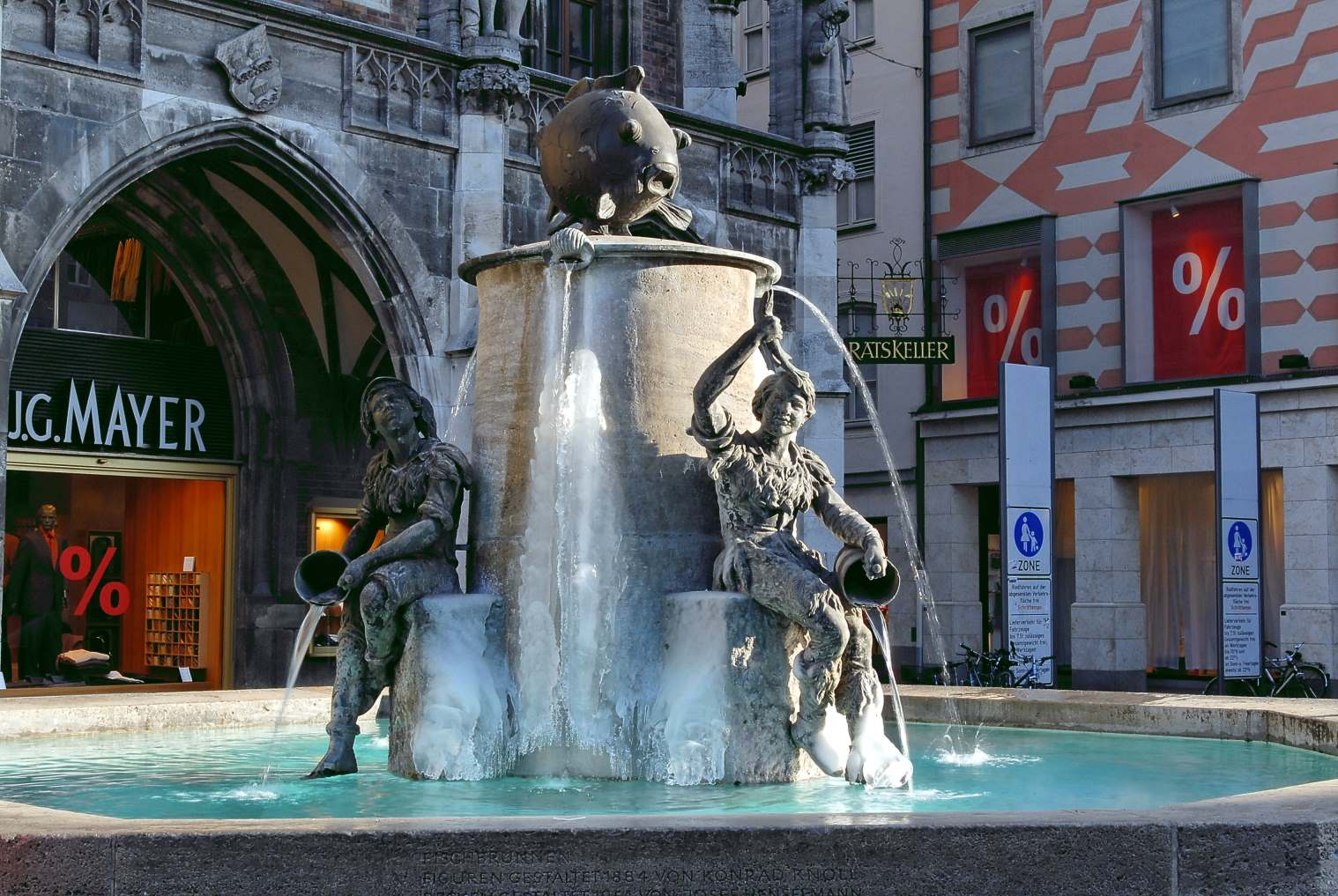
Fischbrunnen 2009

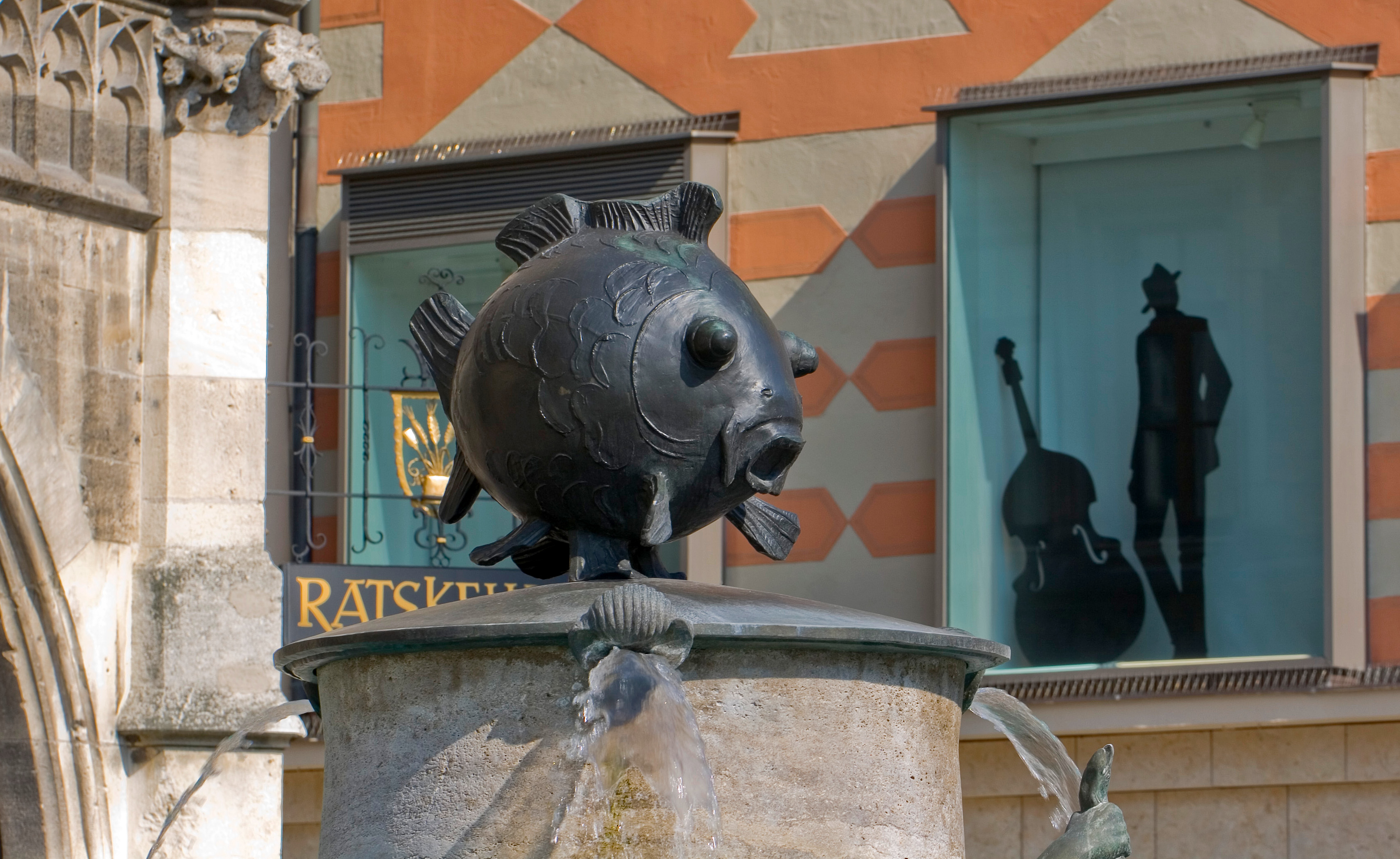
Detail of the fish on the top of the fountain (2012).

The Fischbrunnen is a fountain in the center of Munich, whose history can be traced back to the Middle Ages. In 1954, Josef Henselmann created the fountain in its present form, using parts of Konrad Knoll’s neo-gothic fountain that was destroyed during the Second World War.

== Location ==
The Fischbrunnen is located in front of the main entrance of the New Town Hall on the Marienplatz in the old town of Munich.

== Story ==
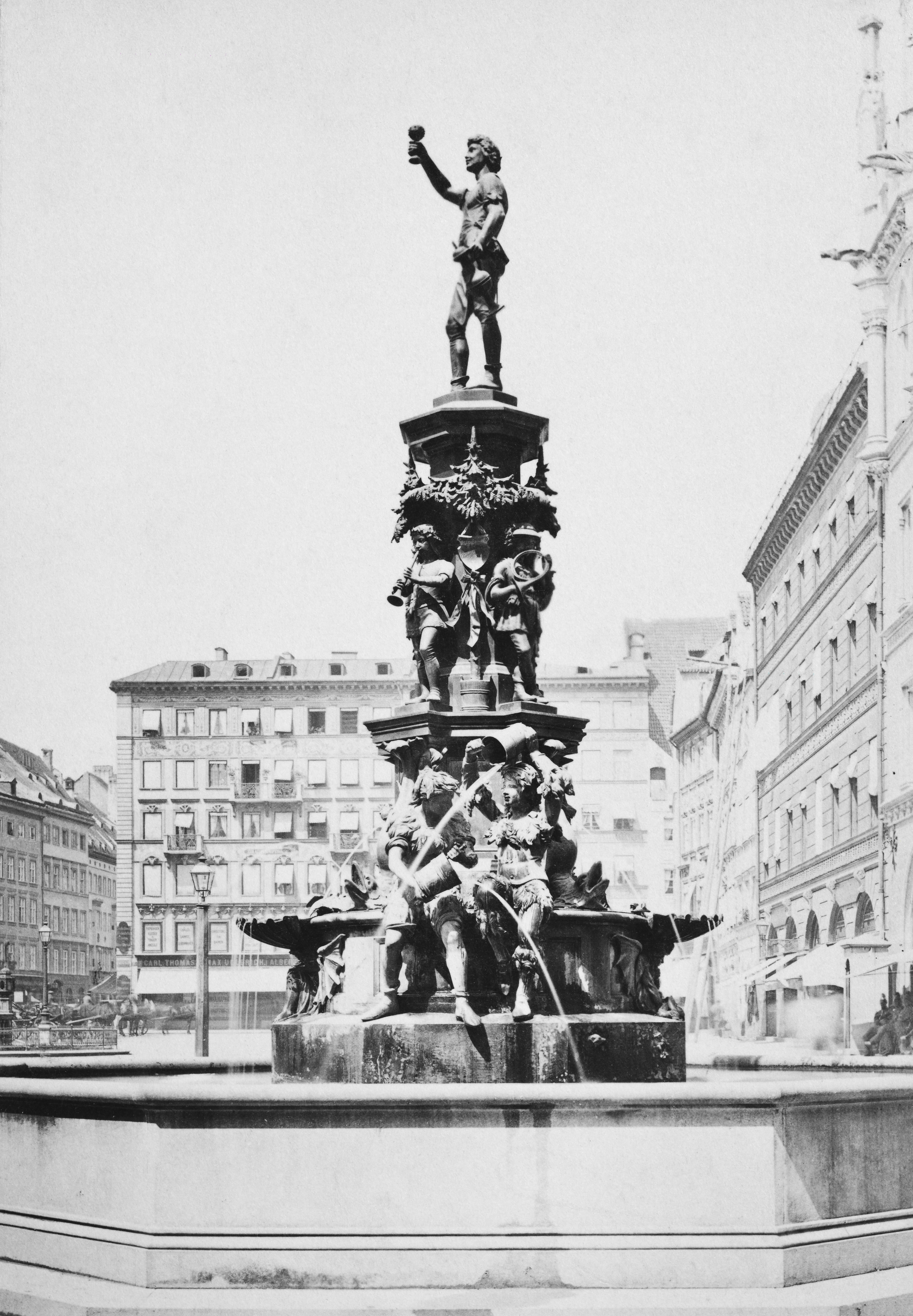
Fischbrunnen 1890

On the Schrannenplatz, today's Marienplatz, a fountain was established in the year 1318, whose exact location can no longer be determined. In 1343 a "citizen's fountain" is mentioned, which was later also called "Marktbrunnen". It was located in the northeastern area of the square, which is now the location of today's Fischbrunnen. At this location, it was a dug-out or draining fountain, which reached the groundwater, which is relatively shallow under the center of Munich.

After completion of the first water pipeline transporting water from sources outside the city to the city center of Munich, the fountain on the Marienplatz was the first and for a long time the only fountain connected to the new water pipe. The fountain supplied constantly flowing water from four brass tubes.

The predecessor of today's Fischbrunnen was designed by Konrad Knoll in 1862 to 1865 and put into operation on 19 September 1866. The bronze sculptures of the neo-gothic fountain were poured in the Ferdinand von Millers royal ore-foundry. In the fish-fountain itself were four butcher builders, who poured buckets of water into the fountain. Above them stood four musical children. At the top stood a senior journeyman with a raised cup.

Since 29 July 1884, water from the Mangfall Valley flows out of the fountain. This is also the reason for the engraved 1884 in the basin.

After the almost complete destruction in the war in 1944, Joseph Henselmann recreated the fountain in 1954, using three remaining butcher figures. Three musicians of the Knoll Fountain were also preserved and are now to be found at the Karlstor.

The fountain now consists of a Nagelfluh basin, whose central column is crowned by a bronze fish from Henselmann's pupil Otto Kallenbach. This fish is reminiscent of the time when the Marienplatz still served as a central market place and the fishmonger hung their still living goods in baskets in the fresh fountain water. The three butchers let their buckets pour water into the basin, therefore the figure group plays on the "Metzgerprung" (see below).

In the course of a fundamental restoration in 1991, the fountain was equipped with a ground-water drinking point for the Munich dogs. During the last renovation in autumn 2011, the joints of the basin were re-sealed and the bronze figures were decalcified and preserved.

== Traditions at the fountain ==
=== Butchering ===
At the fountain, the butcher's apprentices were "freed" on Rosenmontag, until the Second World War. Today this corresponds to the handing over of the journeyman letter as conclusion of the butcher training. Up to the 19th century, the "Metzgersprung" was carried out, in which the apprentices threw themselves into the water of the fountain, free-spirited, and were also submerged. When they came back up, apples, nuts and coins were thrown among the spectators which were also splashed with water. The Metzgersprung might have been a kind of baptism, since the apprentices were then free from their sins of youth (the youthful sins).

In 1793, Elector Karl Theodor banned the custom, which King Maximilian II revived more than half a century later. In the twentieth century the tradition was carried out sporadically. The Stadtchronik recorded a re-enactment of the historical butcher's jumping after a 32-year break. There were unexpectedly large numbers of people in panic-like scenes, in which several people had broken ribs and 174 required medical attention. The next Metzgersprung was in 1954 at the unveiling of the Henselmann Fischbrunnen. The planned jump for the 800th city anniversary in 1958, on the other hand, was canceled because of a disagreement in the wake of a food scandal.

Since 1995, the jump has taken place regularly, albeit at a three-year pace, most recently on September 8, 2013.

=== Wallet washing ===
On Ash Wednesday, the mayor of Munich, usually together with the city chamberlain, washed an empty wallet in the water of the Fischbrunnen. This is to ensure that the city funds will be filled again next year.

The wallet washing, whose origins date back to the 15th century, was a custom of the poorer classes. Especially in the nineteenth century, messengers and assistants explained that a salary improvement was necessary when faced with the possibilities of an empty wallet. In the 1950s, Lord Mayor Thomas Wimmer passed the tradition on to the city's wallet.

=== Meeting point ===
The Fischbrunnen is one of the most popular meeting places in Munich, especially for people from the surrounding Munich region.
