= Marienplatz =

City square in Munich, Germany

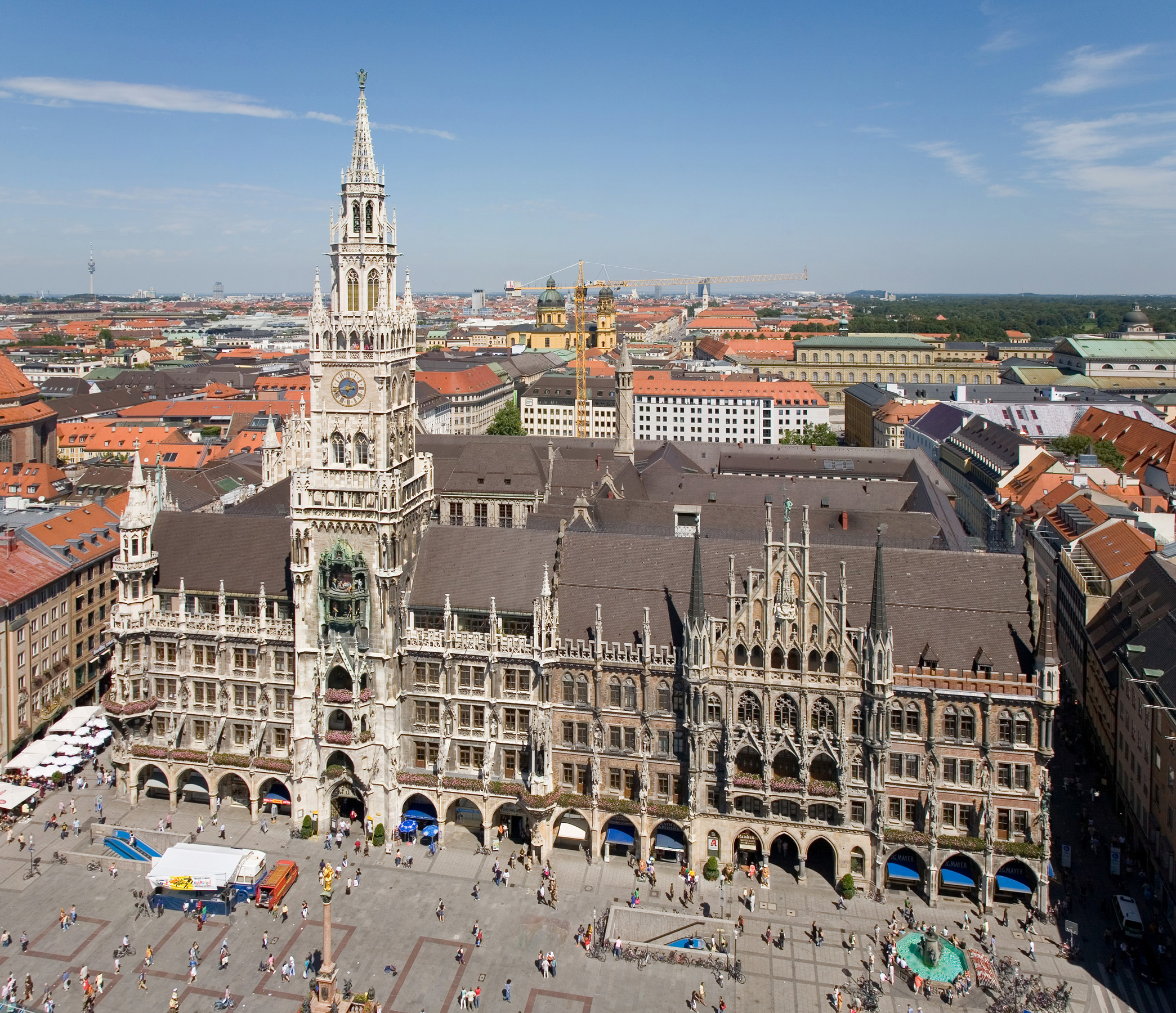
- View of Marienplatz and the New Town Hall

- Location within Germany
- Location: Munich, Germany
- Coordinates: 48°08′14″N 11°34′32″E

Marienplatz (English: Mary's Square, i.e., St. Mary, Our Lady's Square) is a central square in the city centre of Munich, Germany. It has been the city's main square since 1158.

== History ==
During the Middle Ages, markets and tournaments were held in the Marienplatz, which was originally called Markth ("market"), Schranne ("grain market") and later Schrannenplatz ("grain market square"). After the grain market was moved into the modern glass-and-iron Schranne near "Blumenstrasse" in 1853, the square received its new name, starting 9 October 1854.

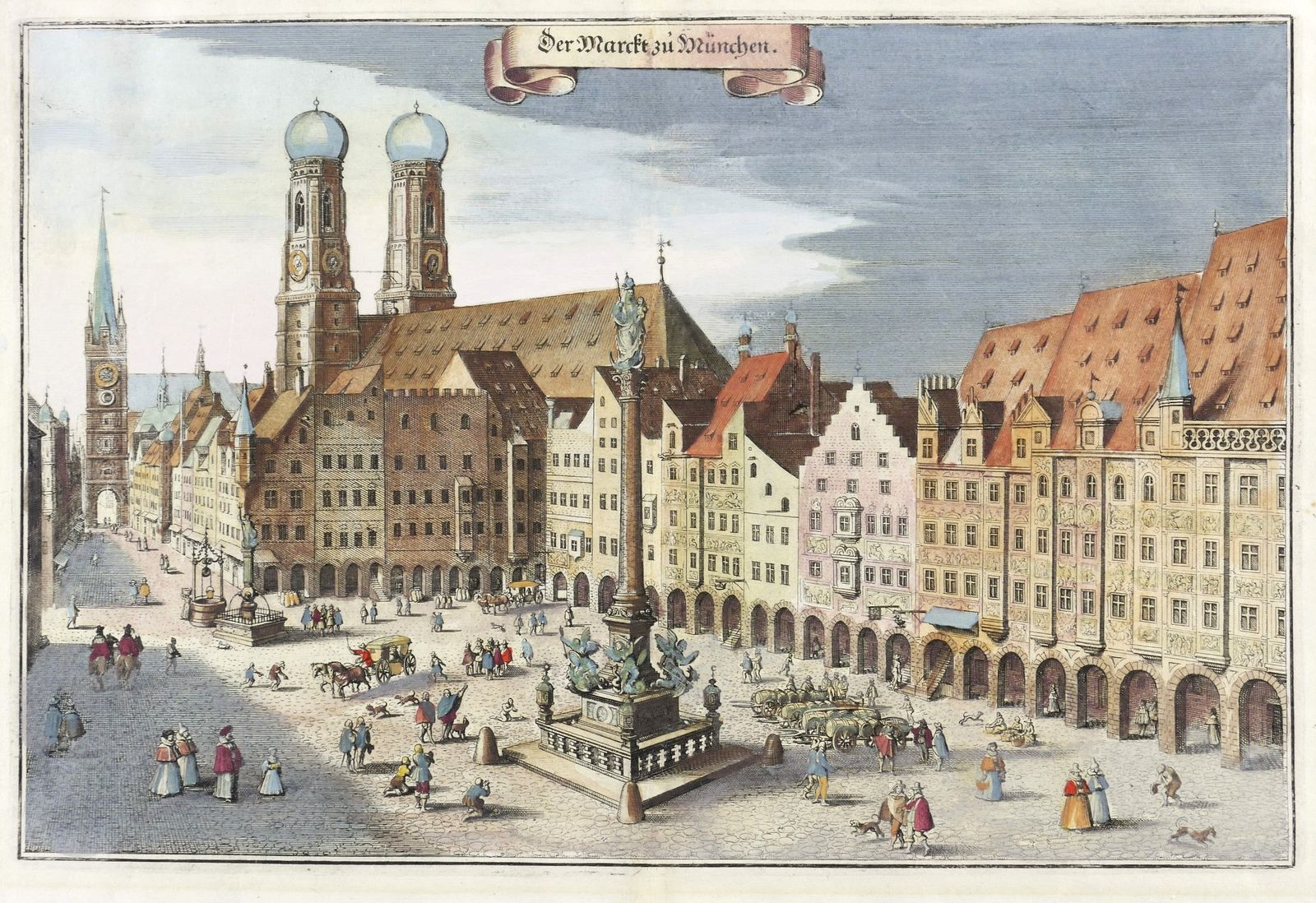
View of the New Town Hall and Frauenkirche looking westward, 1656

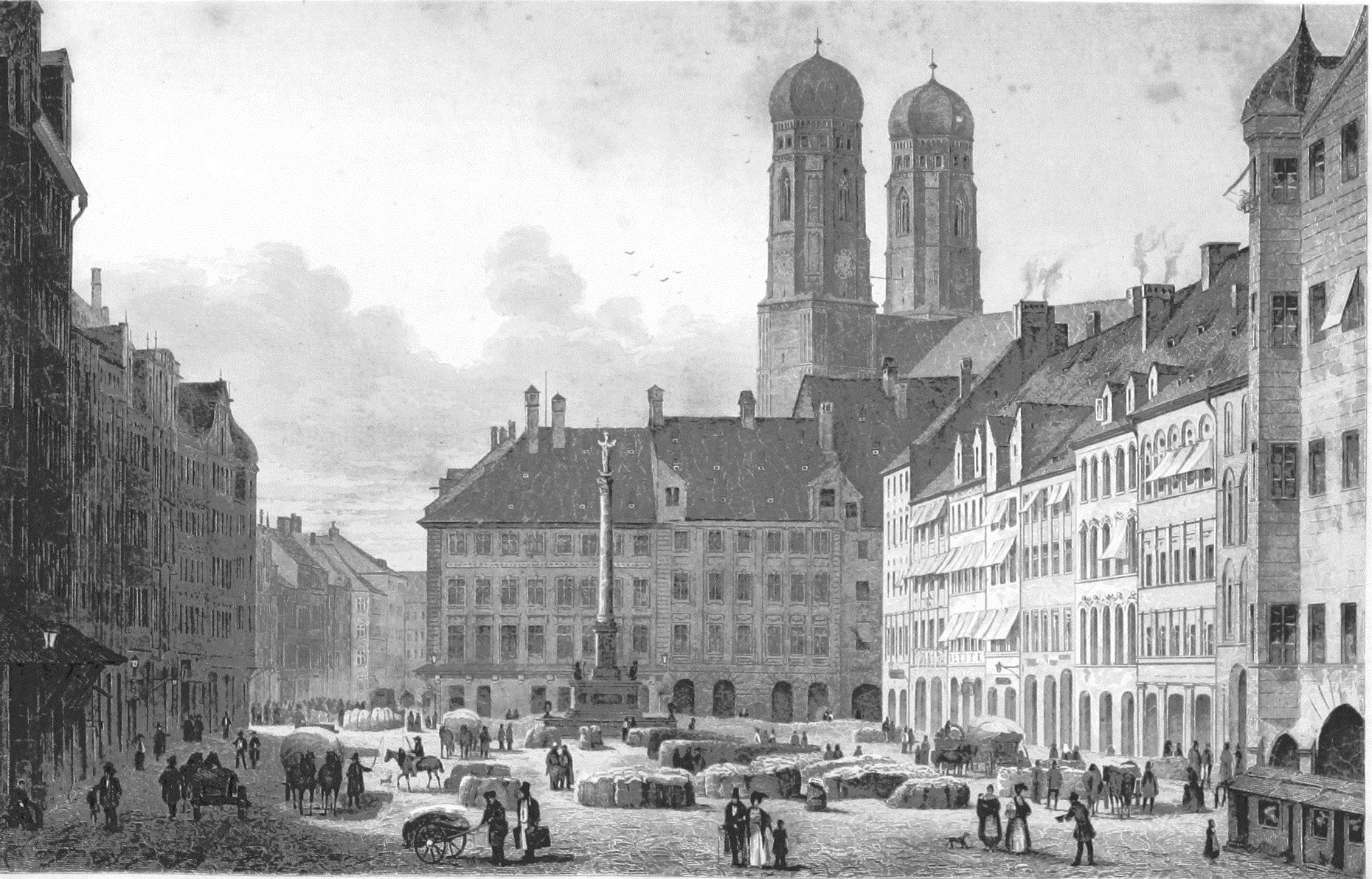
View of the square towards the west from an 1838 print

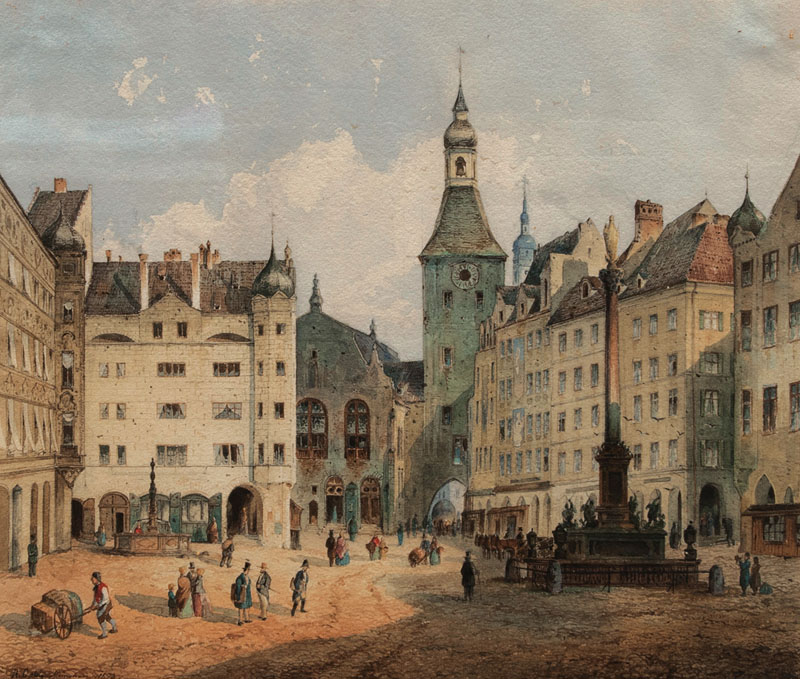
View of the square towards the east from an 1853 painting

== Architecture ==
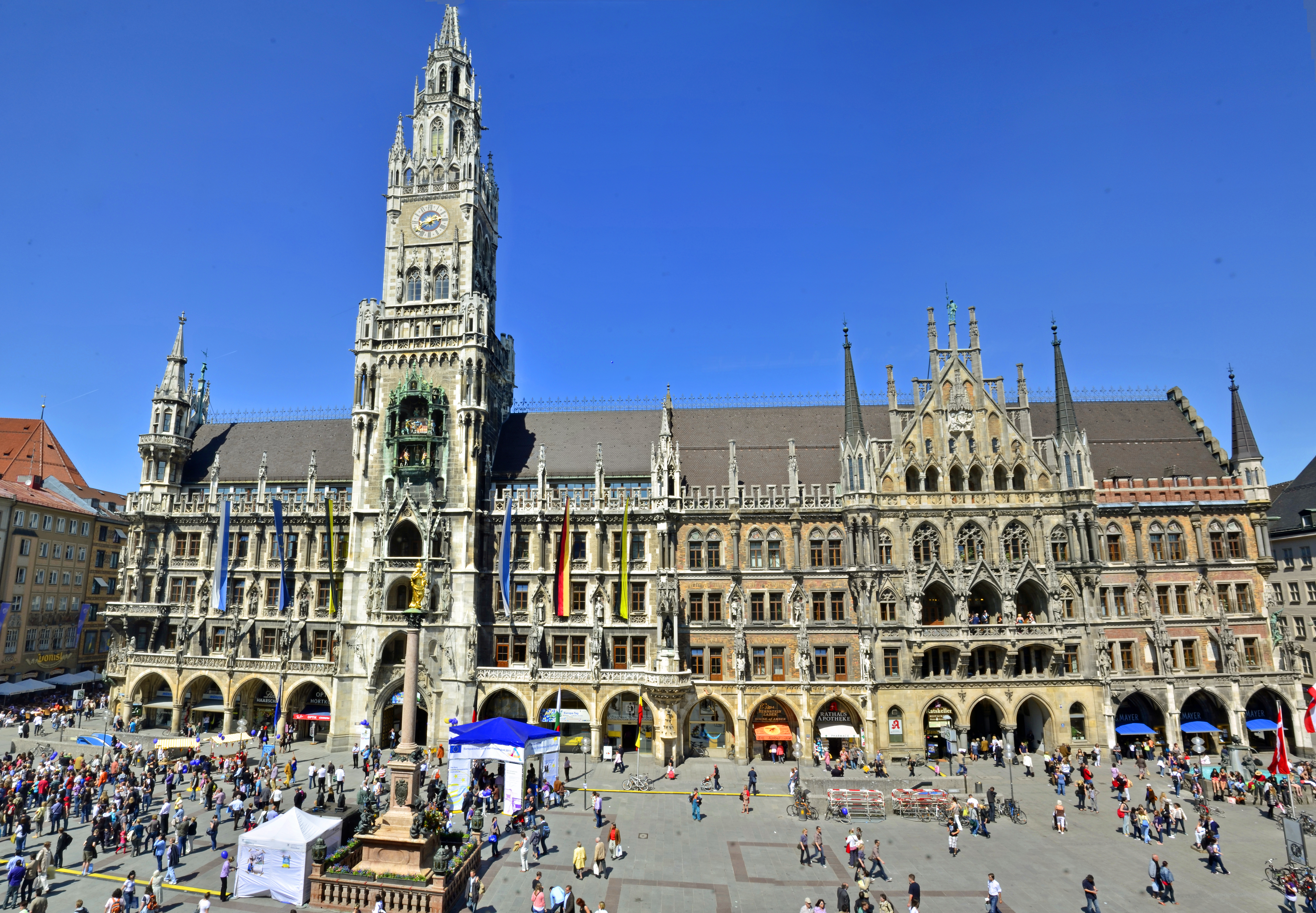
New Town Hall

Marienplatz was named after the Mariensäule, a Marian column erected in its centre in 1638 to celebrate the end of Swedish occupation. Today the Marienplatz is dominated by the New Town Hall (Neues Rathaus) on the north side, and the Old Town Hall (Altes Rathaus, a reconstructed Gothic council hall with a ballroom and tower) on the east side.

The Glockenspiel in the tower of the New Town Hall was inspired by the tournaments that were held in the square during the Middle Ages, and draws millions of tourists a year. Furthermore, the pedestrian zone between Karlsplatz and Marienplatz is a crowded area with numerous shops and restaurants.

== Mary's Column ==
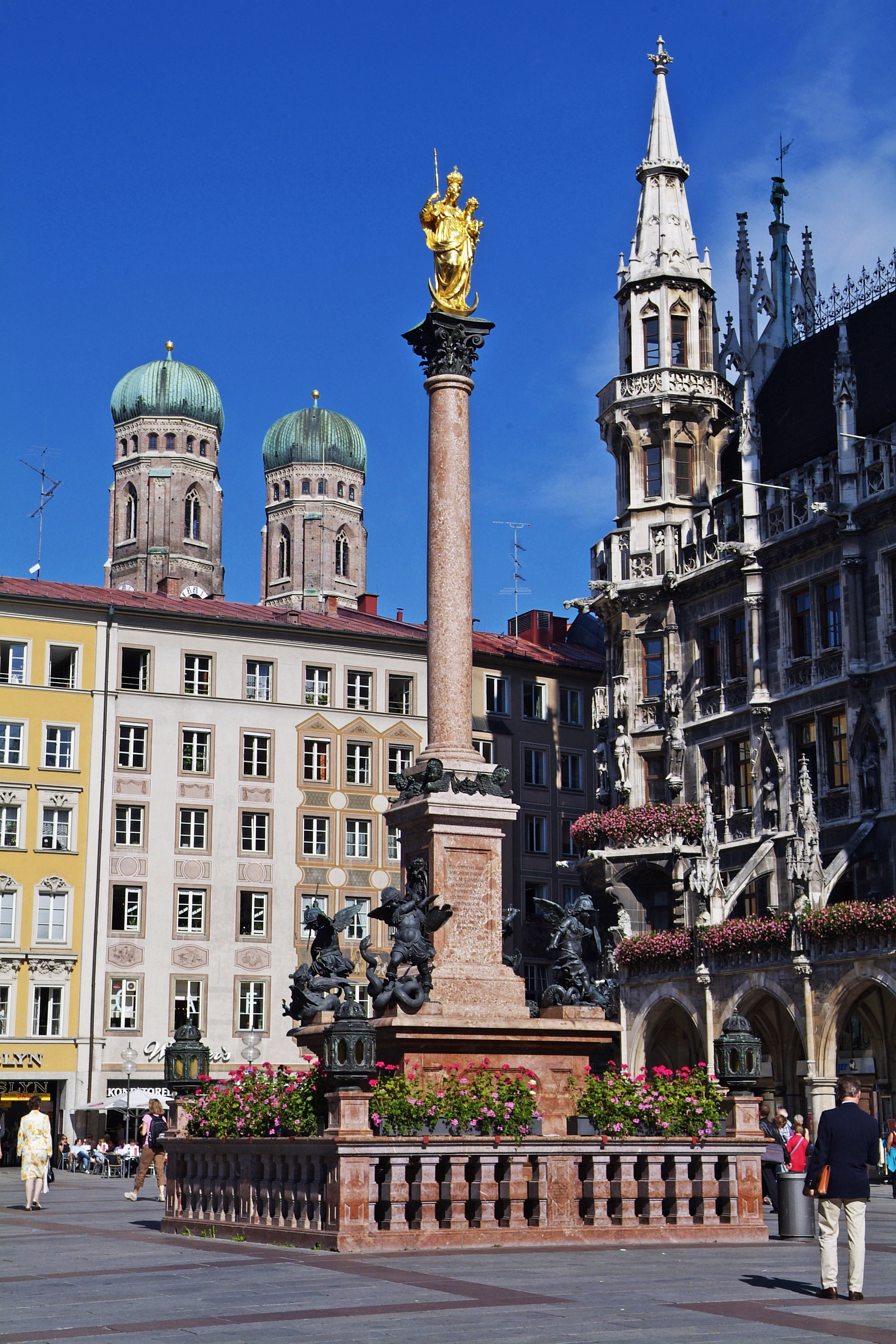
Marienplatz with Mariensäule

The Mariensäule is a Marian column located on the Marienplatz in Munich, Germany. Mary is revered here as Patrona Bavariae (Latin: Protector of Bavaria). It was erected in 1638 to celebrate the end of Swedish occupation during the Thirty Years' War, following a respective vow by Duke Elector Maximilian I of Bavaria if the ducal residential cities of Munich and Landshut were spared from war destruction. The column is topped by a golden statue of the Virgin Mary standing on a crescent moon as the Queen of Heaven, created in 1590. The figure was originally located in the Frauenkirche. Mariensäule in Munich was the first column of this type built north of the Alps and inspired the construction of other Marian columns in this part of Europe.

At each corner of the column's pedestal is a statue of a putto, created by Ferdinand Murmann. The four putti are each depicted fighting a different beast, symbolizing the city's overcoming of adversities: war represented by the lion, pestilence by the cockatrice, hunger or famine by the dragon and heresy by the serpent.

== Christmas Market ==
Three weeks before Christmas the Christkindlmarkt opens at Marienplatz and other squares in the city, selling Christmas goods and food and drinks.

== Transport ==
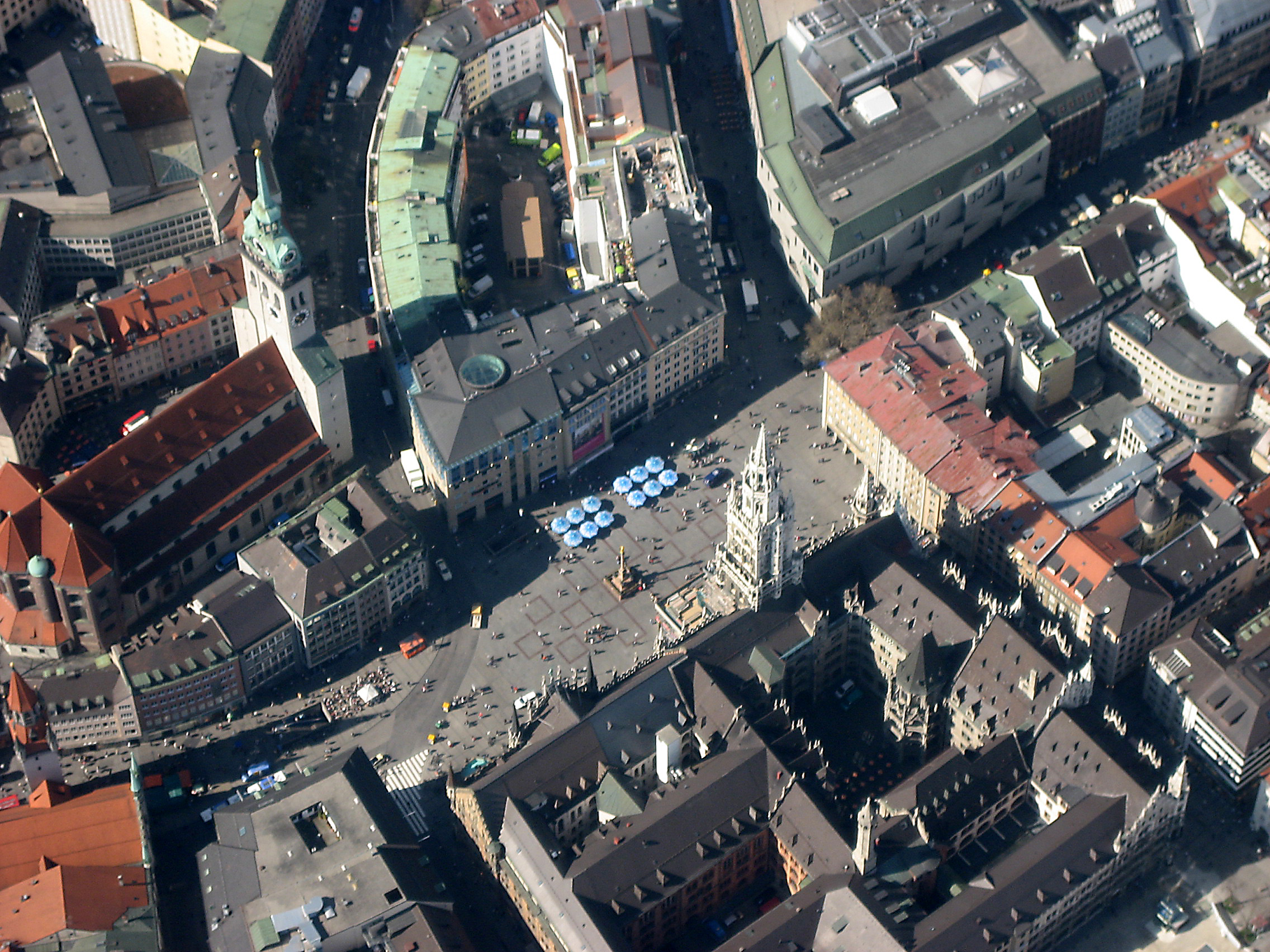
Aerial view of Marienplatz

The square is served by the Munich Marienplatz station, offering both U-Bahn and S-Bahn access.

A new station, Marienhof, will be built to the north of the square, as part of the second S-Bahn tunnel project (Zweite Stammstrecke). The new station will also connect to the existing lines.

== Gallery ==
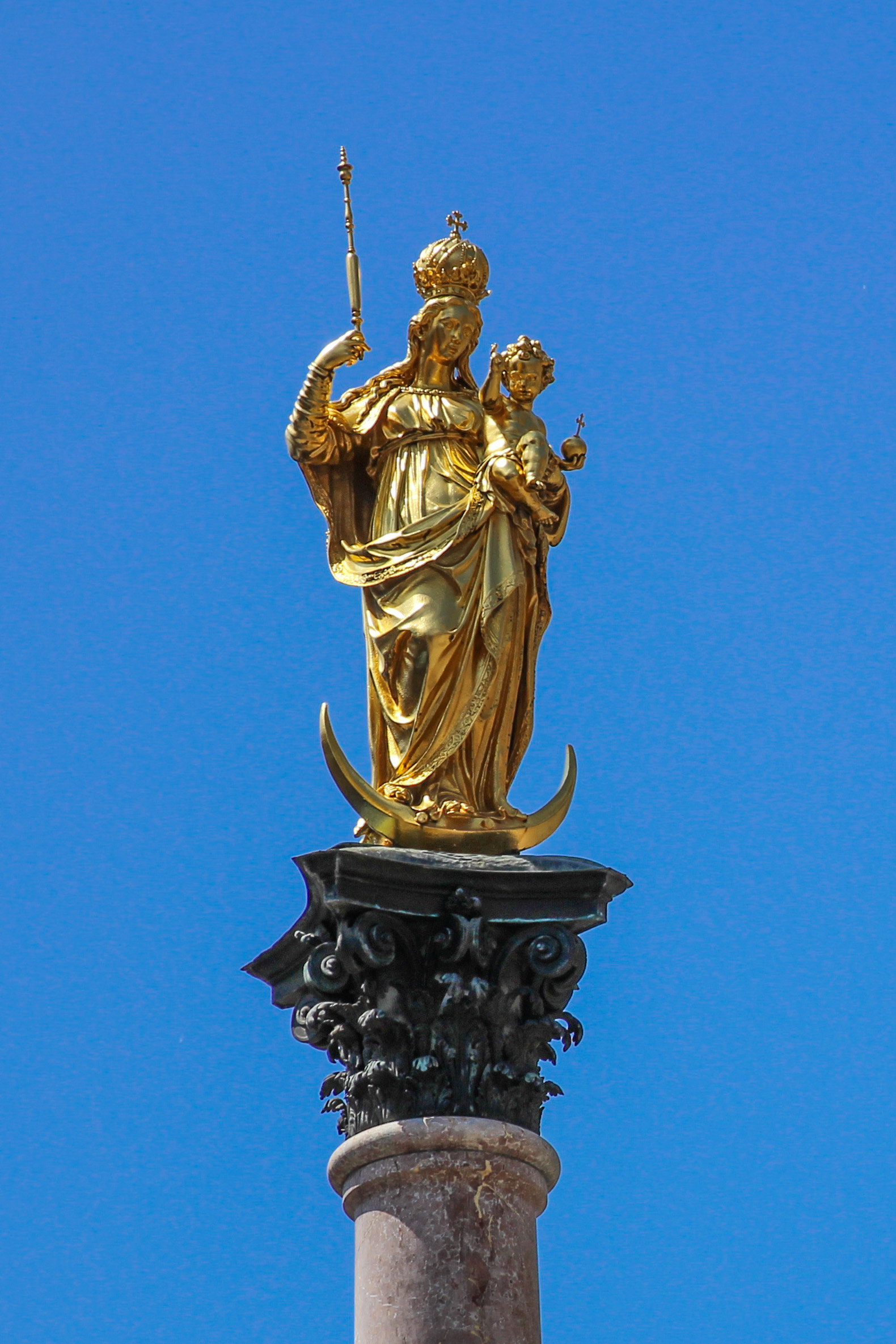
Marian column

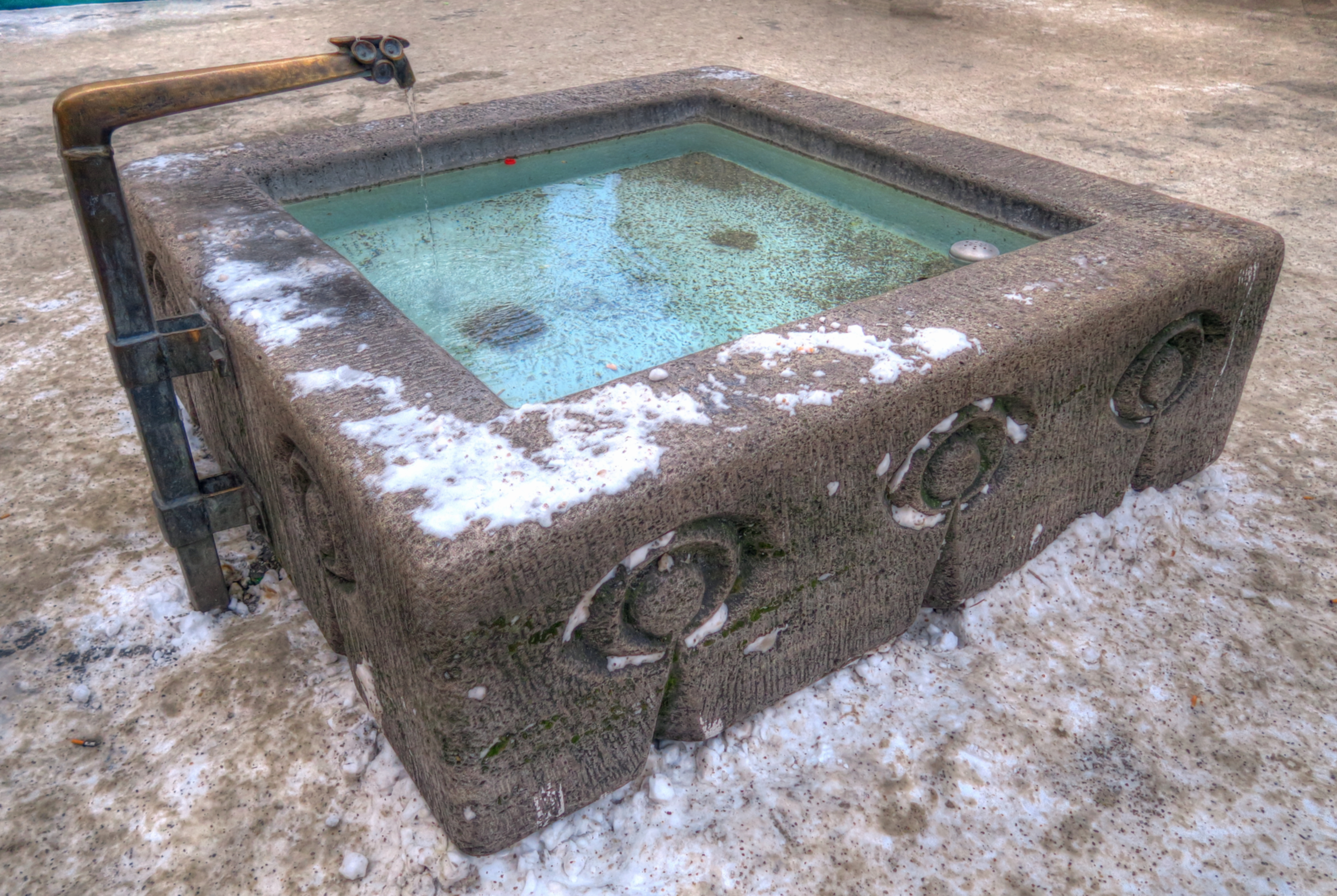
Krautlmarkt fountain

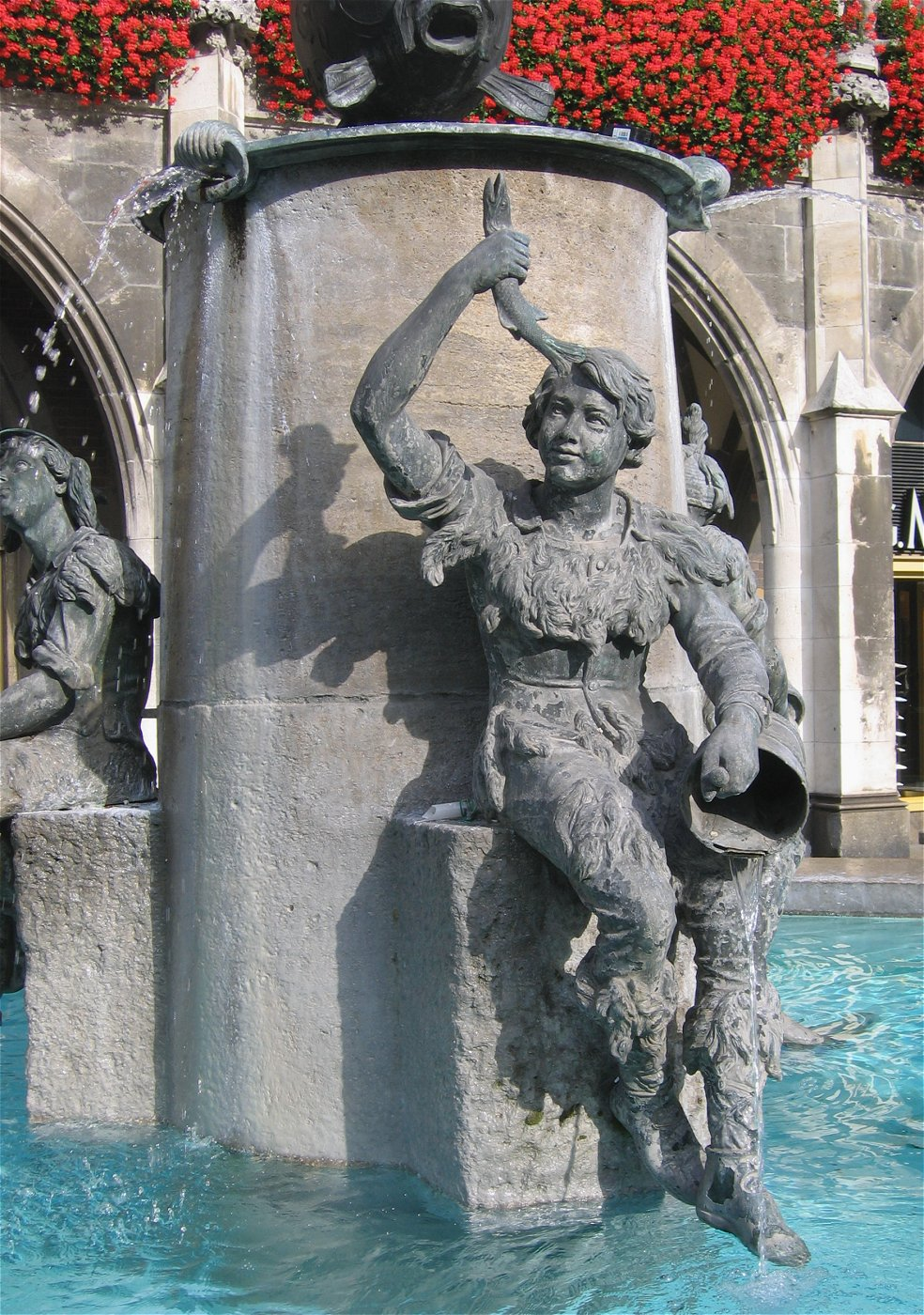
Fish fountain

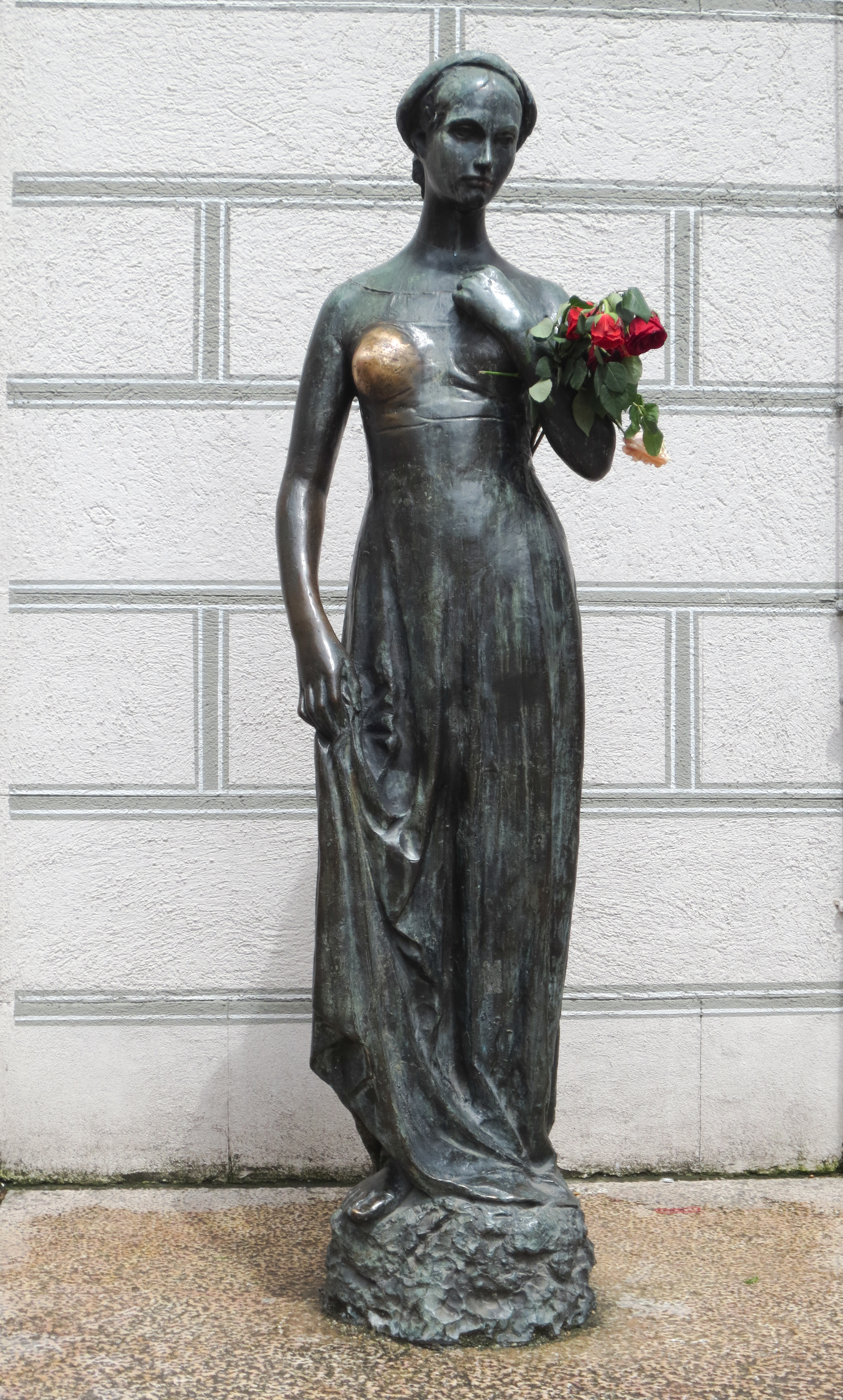
Charming Julia

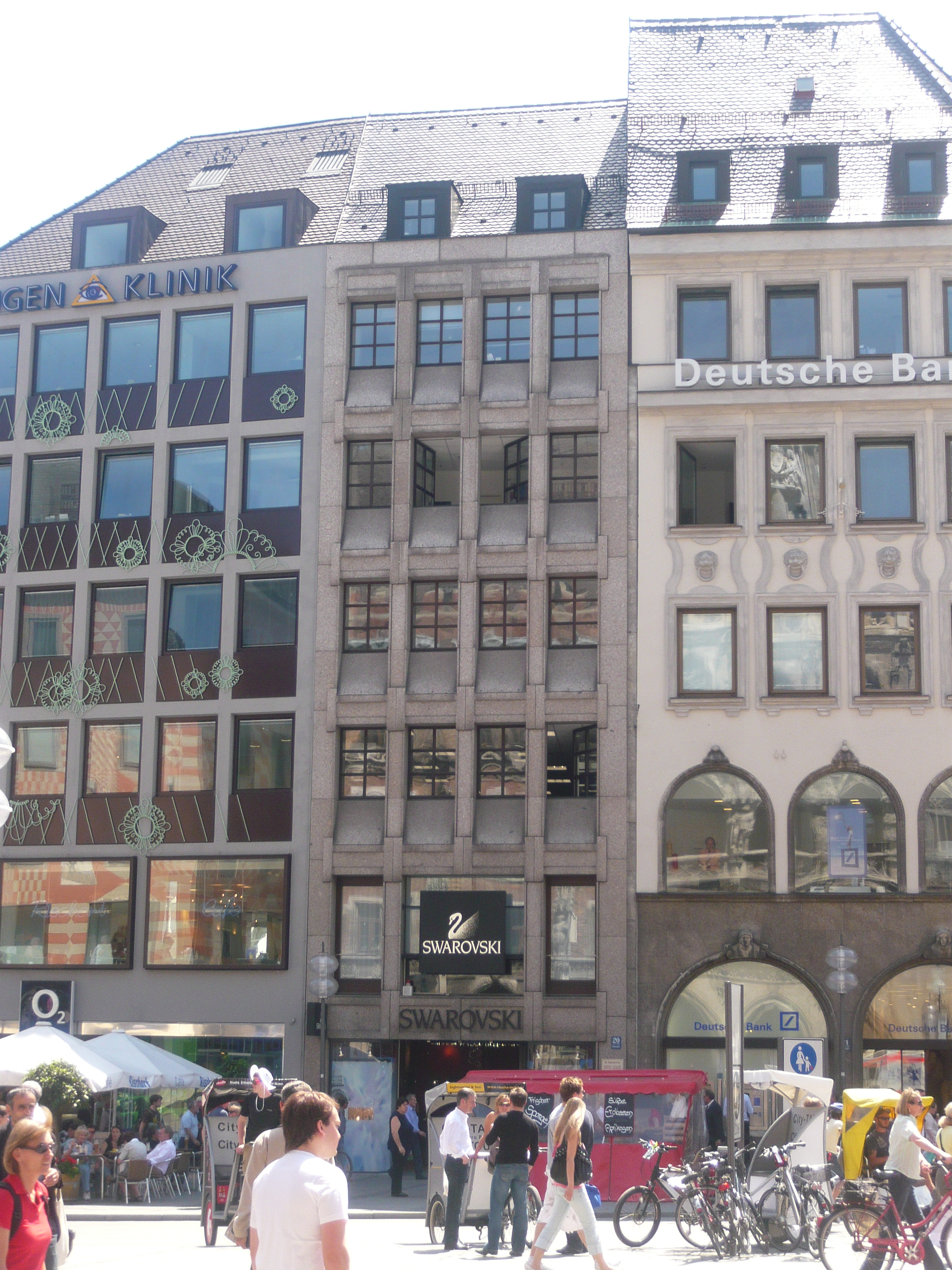
Swarovski store at Marienplatz

== See also ==
- Fischbrunnen
