= Bad Bergzabern =

Place in Rhineland-Palatinate, Germany

- Town
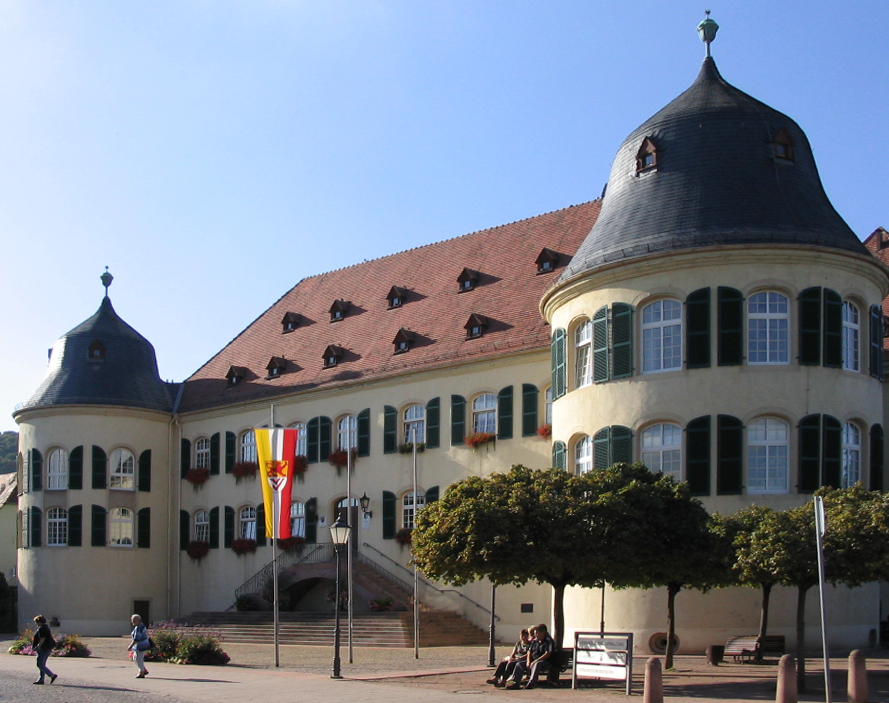

- Coat of arms

- Location of Bad Bergzabern within Südliche Weinstraße district
- Interactive map of Bad Bergzabern
- Location within Germany Location within Rhineland-Palatinate
- Coordinates: 49°06′10″N 7°59′57″E
- Country: Germany
- State: Rhineland-Palatinate
- District: Südliche Weinstraße
- Municipal assoc.: Bad Bergzabern

Government
  - Mayor (2019–24): Hermann Augspurger

Area
  - Total: 10.71 km^{2} (4.14 sq mi)
- Elevation: 170 m (560 ft)

Population (2025-12-31)
  - Total: 8,664
  - Density: 809.0/km^{2} (2,095/sq mi)
- Time zone: UTC+01:00 (CET)
  - Summer (DST): UTC+02:00 (CEST)
- Postal codes: 76887
- Dialling codes: 06343
- Vehicle registration: SÜW
- Website: www.bad-bergzabern.de

Bad Bergzabern (German: [baːt ˈbɛʁktsaːbɐn]; Palatine German: Berchzawwre) is a municipality in the Südliche Weinstraße district, on the German Wine Route in Rhineland-Palatinate, Germany. It is situated near the border with France, on the south-eastern edge of the Palatinate Forest, approximately 15 kilometres (9.3 mi) southwest of Landau.

Bad Bergzabern is the seat of the Verbandsgemeinde ("collective municipality") Bad Bergzabern.

Bad Bergzabern has a tradition as a holiday destination and contains various half-timbered houses from the seventeenth and eighteenth centuries. Of particular note from an earlier century is the Gasthaus Zum Engel (1579), which has been described as the most beautiful renaissance building in the entire region.

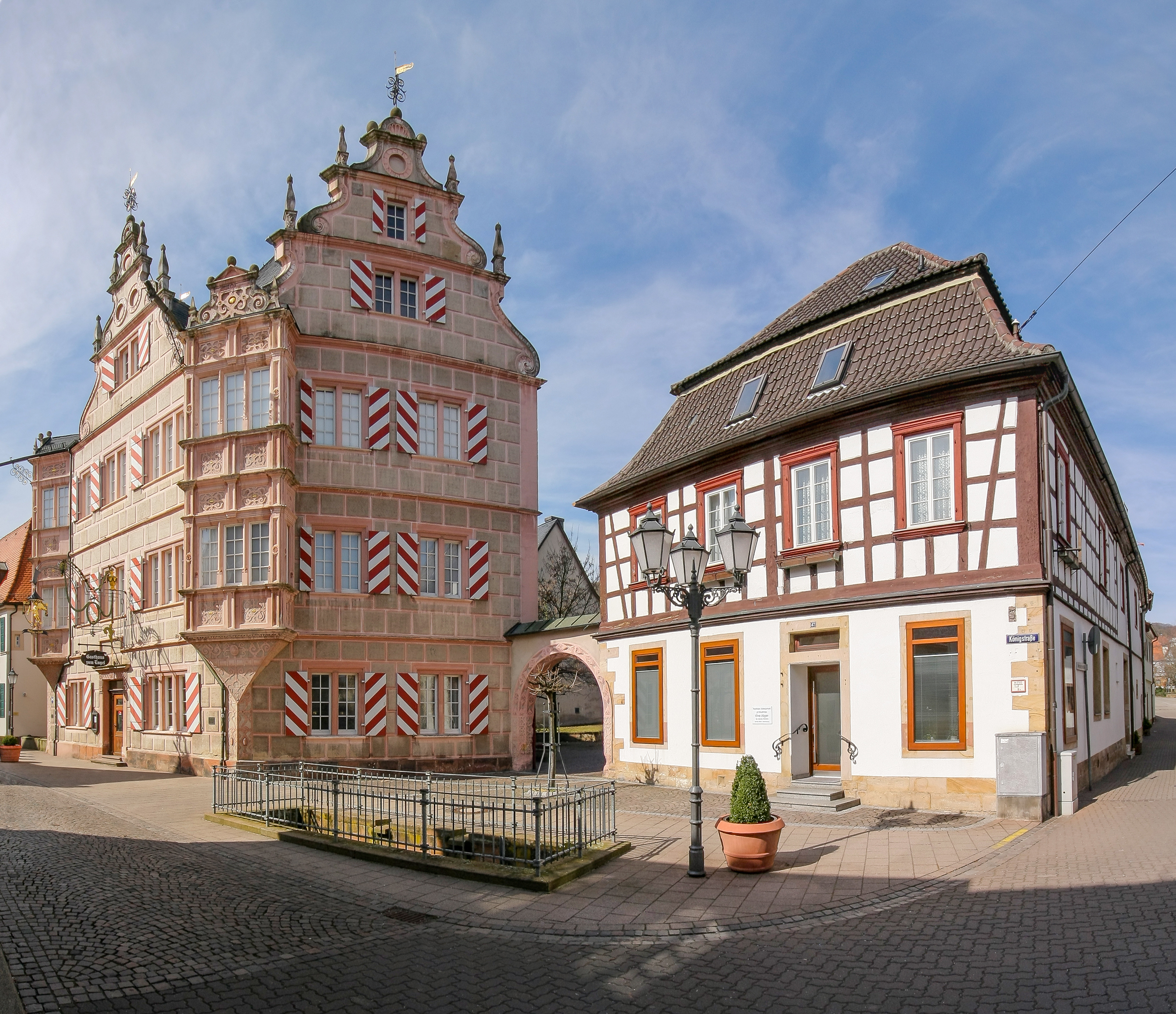
Bad Bergzabern: Gasthaus Zum Engel (1579) )

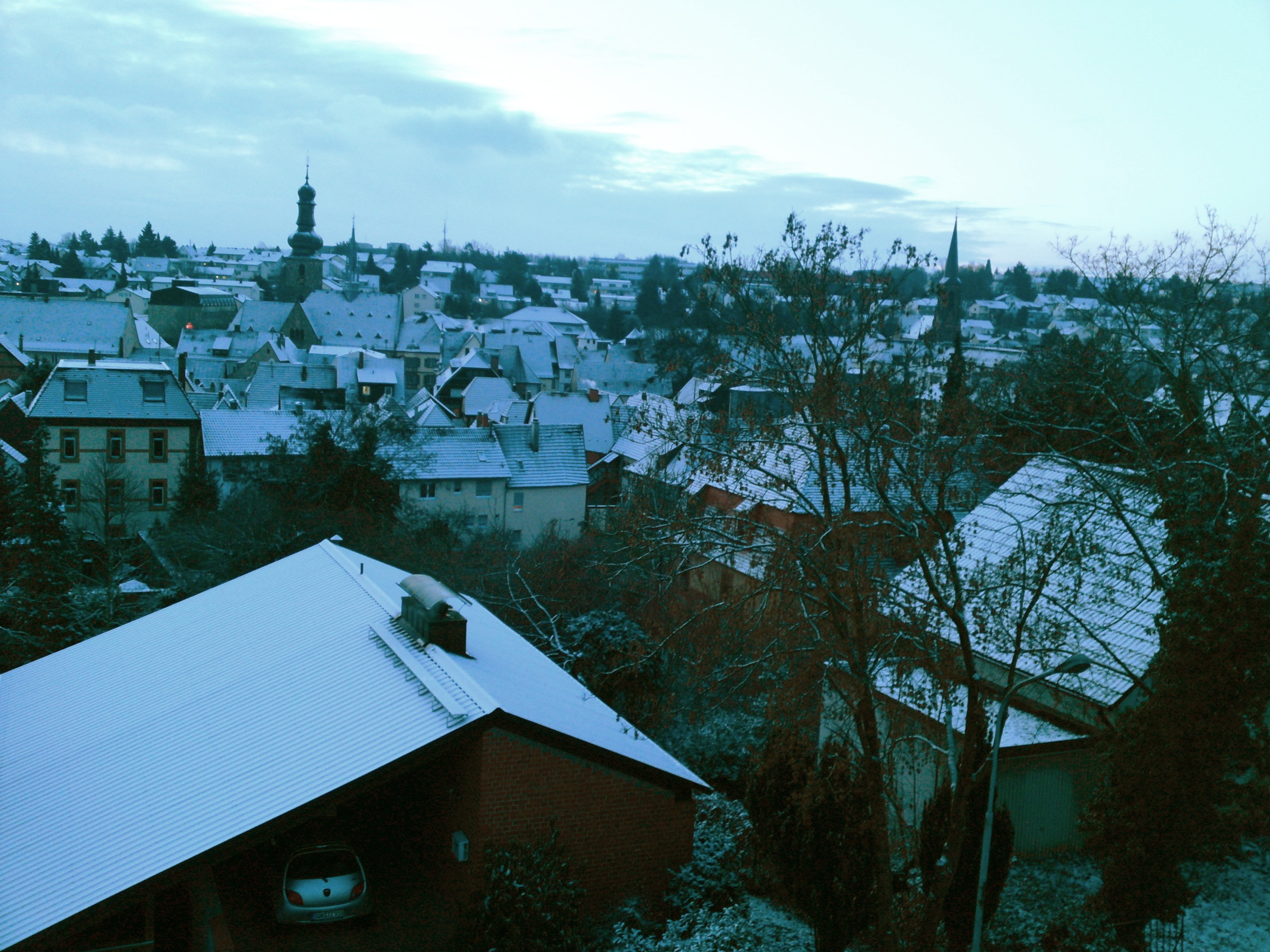
Bad Bergzabern on a wintry morning, seen from the Zeppelinstraße

== History ==
In the sixteenth century local scholars were keen to assert that the town had been founded under the Romans, and sources from this period refer to the medieval Latin name as Tabernae Montanae (trans. "taverns of the mountains"). Although the area was indeed under the control of the Roman empire around the beginning of our era, evidence does not support the notion that Bad Bergzabern had its own origins so far back.

In 1525 the famous botanist Jacobus Theodorus Tabernaemontanus was born here.

In 1676, during the Franco-Dutch War, the French under Louis XIV infamously laid waste the Palatinate region as part of a scheme to enlarge France. Much of Bad Bergzabern was destroyed in the process. One of the few buildings that did survive the French king's torching of the town was the local duke's administrative office, which later became the Gasthaus zum Engel.

Reconstruction began in the eighteenth century under Gustav, Duke of Zweibrücken. The work involved stone buildings in the newly fashionable baroque style and included a residential Schloss for the duke. The project was directed by the architect Jonas Erikson Sundahl (1678-1762) who shared the duke's own Swedish provenance.

Friedrich Julius Marx, wrote a short history of Bergzabern „Oratio de Tabernis Montanis“ (Zweibrücken 1730).

The overlordship of the dukes of Zweibrücken ended with the French Revolution. On 10 November 1792 the townsfolk applied for incorporation within the new French Republic. A generation later former French frontiers were restored after the fall of Napoleon, however, and under the terms of the Second Peace of Paris (10 November 1815) the whole region came under the control of the Wittelsbach kings of Bavaria.

== Population development ==
1871-1987: Census results:

Year	Inhabitants
1815	2.745
1835	2.716
1871	2.419
1905	2.837
1939	5.018
1950	4.059

Year	Inhabitants
1961	5.446
1970	5.392
1987	6.405
1997	8.139
2005	7.936
2025	8664

== Sons and daughters of the town ==
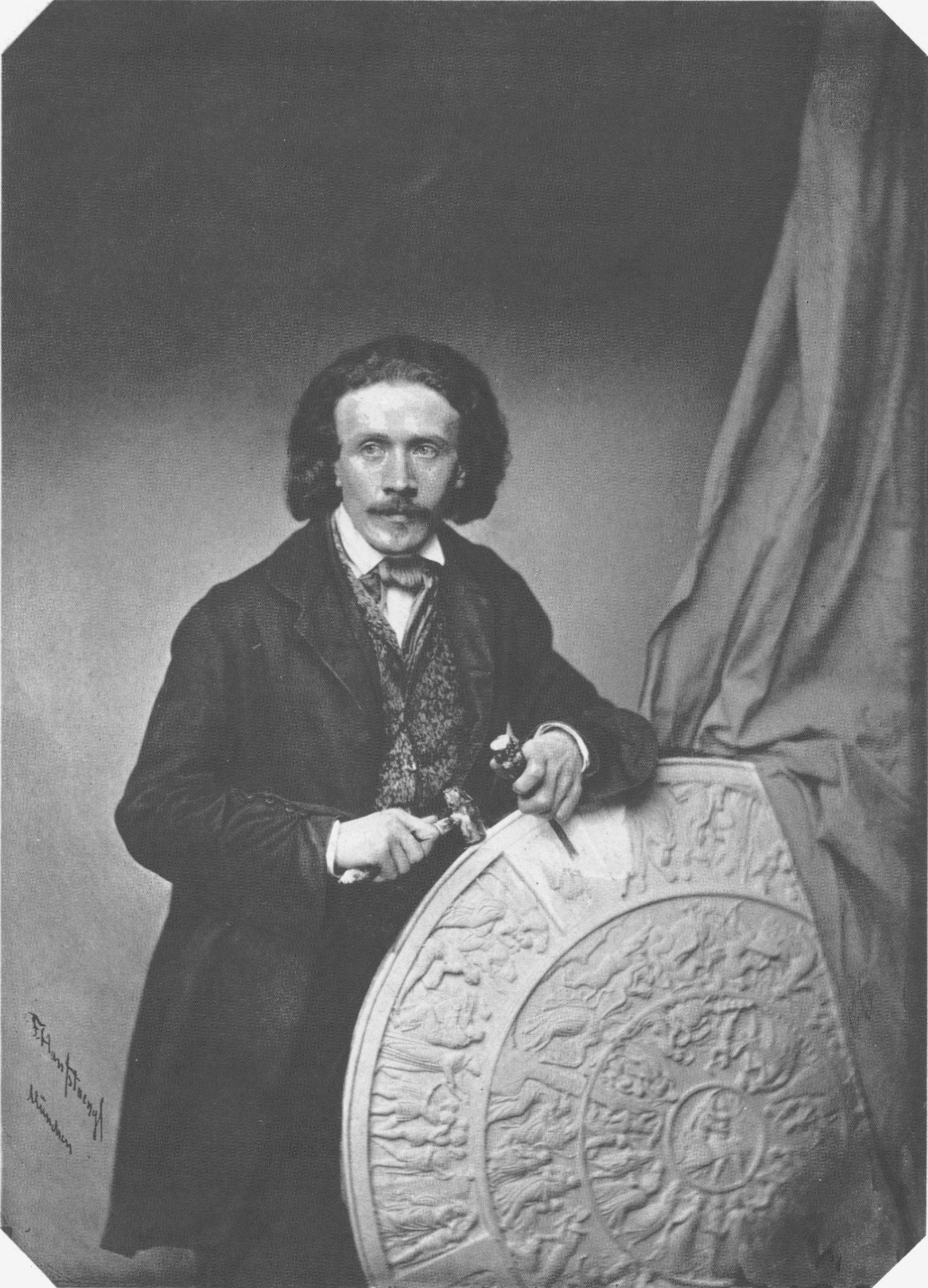
Konrad Knoll appr. 1860

- Konrad Hubert (1507-1577), theologian and composer
- Tabernaemontanus (actually: Jakob Theodor von Bergzaben; 1522-1590), professor of botany and medicine, honoured as the "father of German botany"
- Johann Wolff (1537-1600), lawyer, diplomat and historian
- Johann Wilhelm Petersen (librarian) (1758-1815), librarian
- Georg Weber (1808-1888), philologist and historian
- Karl Culmann (1821-1881), civil engineer, structural engineer
- Konrad Knoll (1829-1899), sculptor
- Ludwig Döderlein (1855-1936), zoologist and professor
- Oskar Bolza (1857-1942), mathematician
- Hans Hoffmann (politician) (1893-1952), politician (SPD)
- Kurt Beck (born 1949), politician (SPD), 1994-2013 Prime Minister of Rhineland-Palatinate 1994-2013
- Oliver Stang (born 1988), football player
