= Christkindlmarkt at Marienplatz =

Christmas market in Munich, Germany

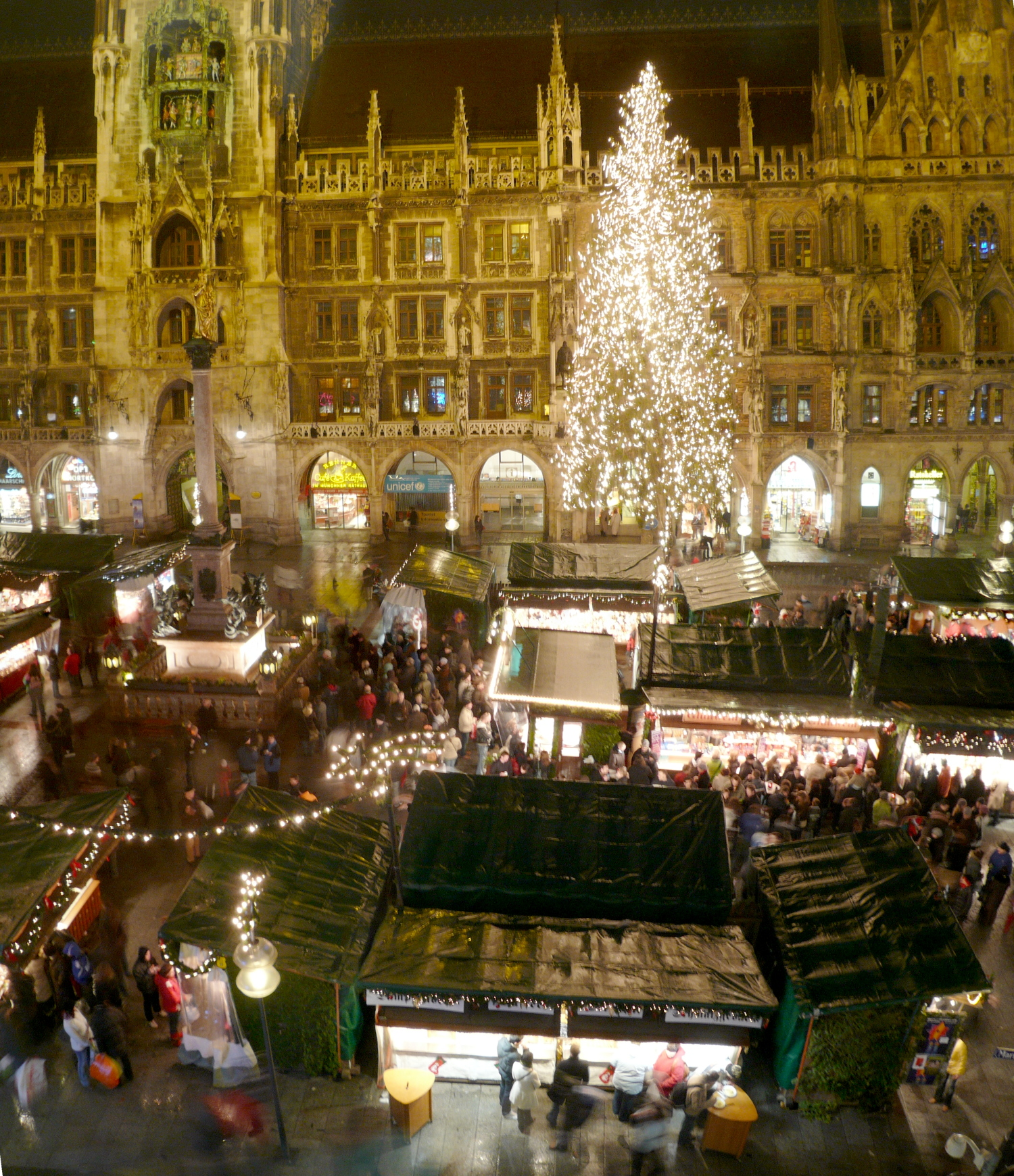
Munich Christkindlmarkt at the Marienplatz

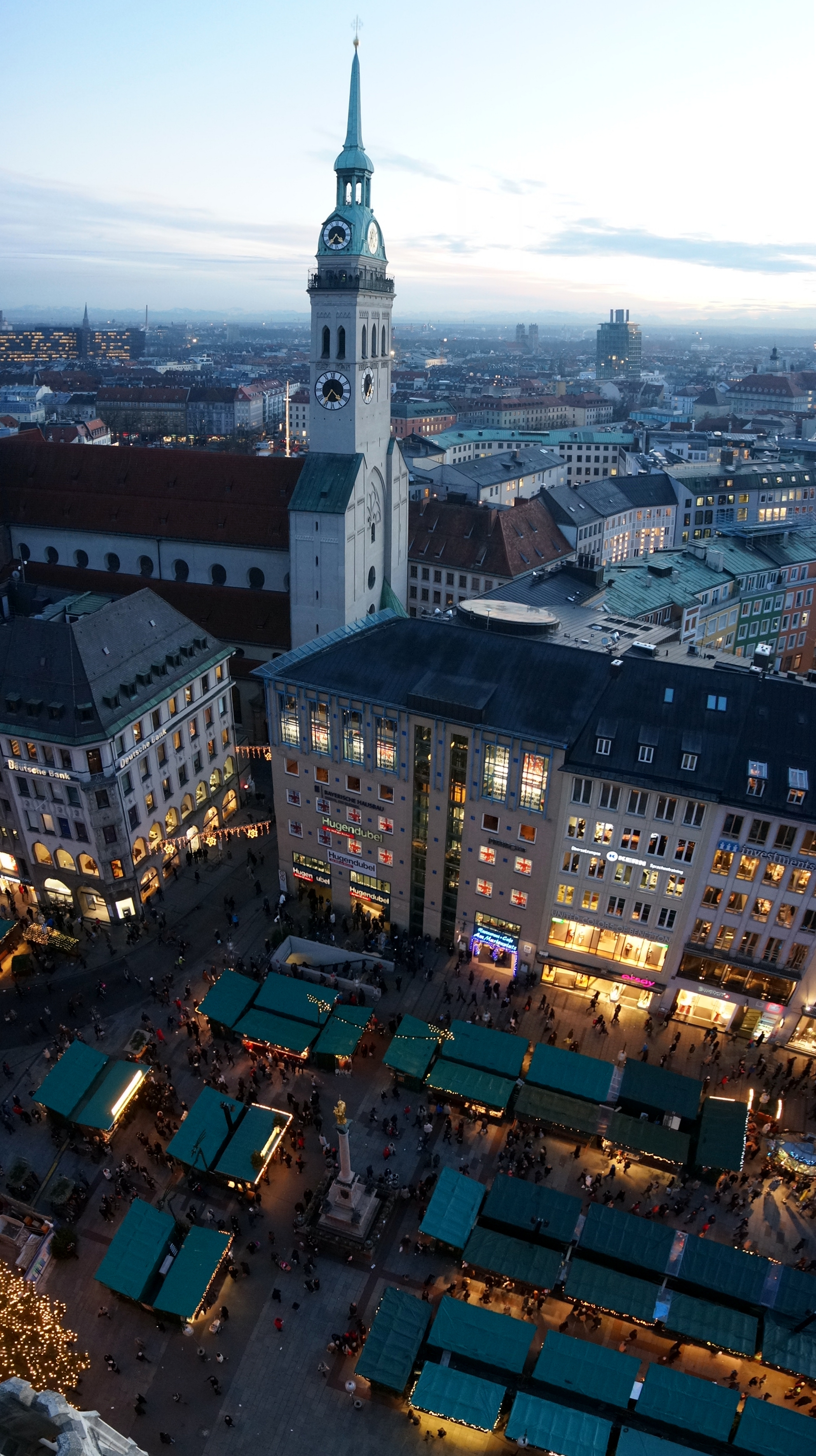
Seen from the Rathausturm

The Christkindlmarkt at Marienplatz is a Christmas market at Marienplatz in Munich.

== History ==
The largest and oldest Christmas market in Munich was first documented as a Nikolaimarkt (Nikolausmarkt) in 1310, making it one of the oldest Christmas markets in the German-speaking world. In 1806, the Nikolaimarkt was renamed the Christmarkt. Since 1972, the market has found its place of business on the Marienplatz after several changes of location. Over the last few years, the exhibition area has been extended considerably (e.g. Rindermarkt). The organizer is the cultural office of the city administration.

== Description ==
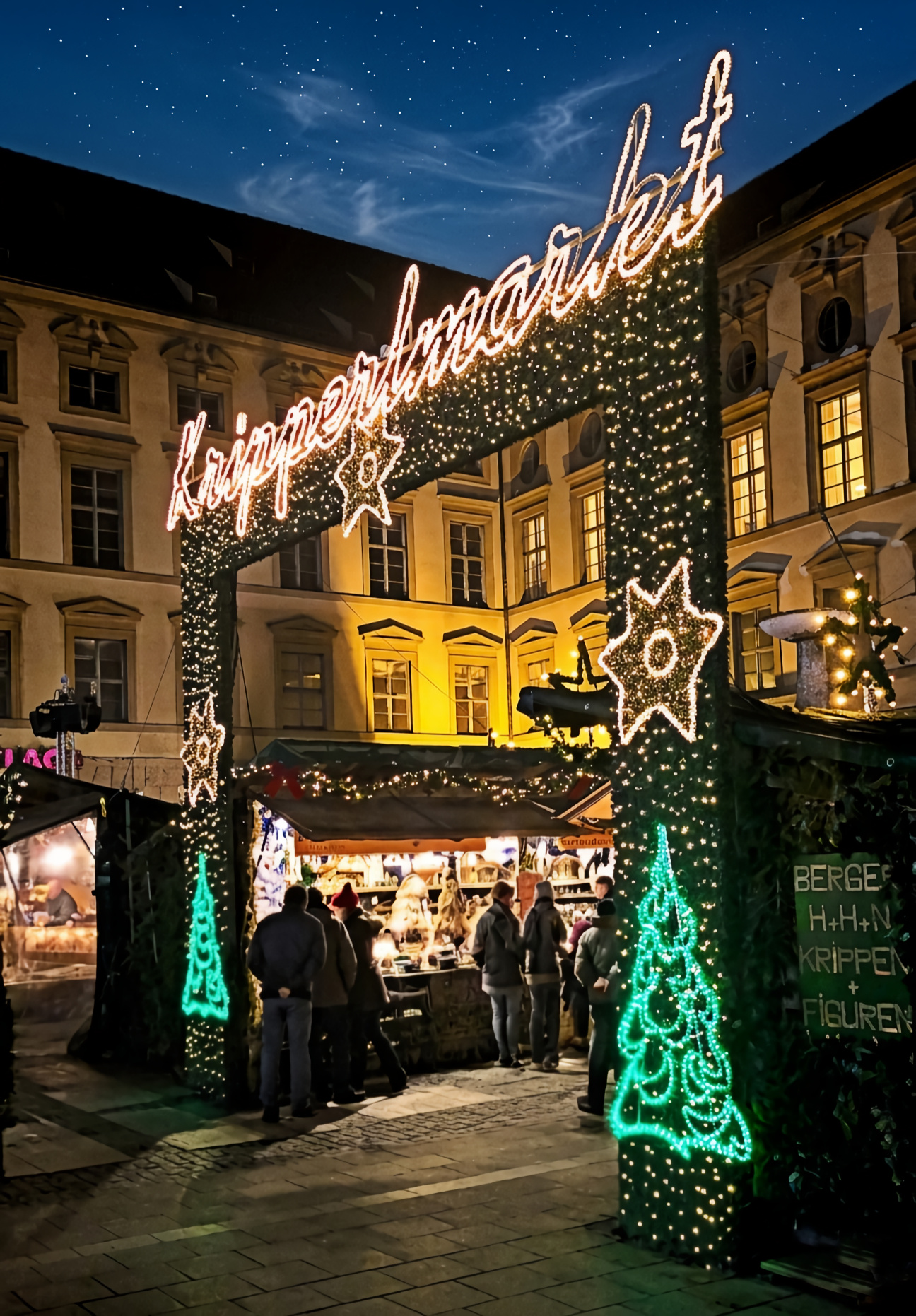
Kripperlmarkt

With around 140 market stands, it now has around three million visitors every year from all over the world. In addition to the extensive musical-cultural accompanying program, the almost 30-meter-high Christmas tree in front of the town hall, with around 2,500 lights, is donated every year to the citizens of Munich by a different town from Austria or Italy. As a reward for the gift, the municipality can present itself in the inner courtyard of the town hall and operate a Glühwein stand. The high interest of non-municipal communities for this in this self-presentation position, forced the organizers to create a multi-faceted waiting list. The market is usually open daily from the Friday before the first Advent Sunday, until Christmas Eve.

To the west of the Marienplatz, in the direction of Stachus, is the so-called Kripperlmarkt. More than ten stands around the Richard Strauss fountain in the Neuhauserstraße offer only Nativity scenes, figures, and other accessories. There are also some market stands offering food and drinks. The Kripperlmarkt in the Munich pedestrian zone is open daily and also closes on 24 December (Christmas Eve) at 2 pm.
