= New Town Hall (Munich) =

Town hall at the northern part of Marienplatz in Munich, Bavaria, Germany

Coordinates: 48°8′15″N 11°34′32″E

- Neues Rathaus
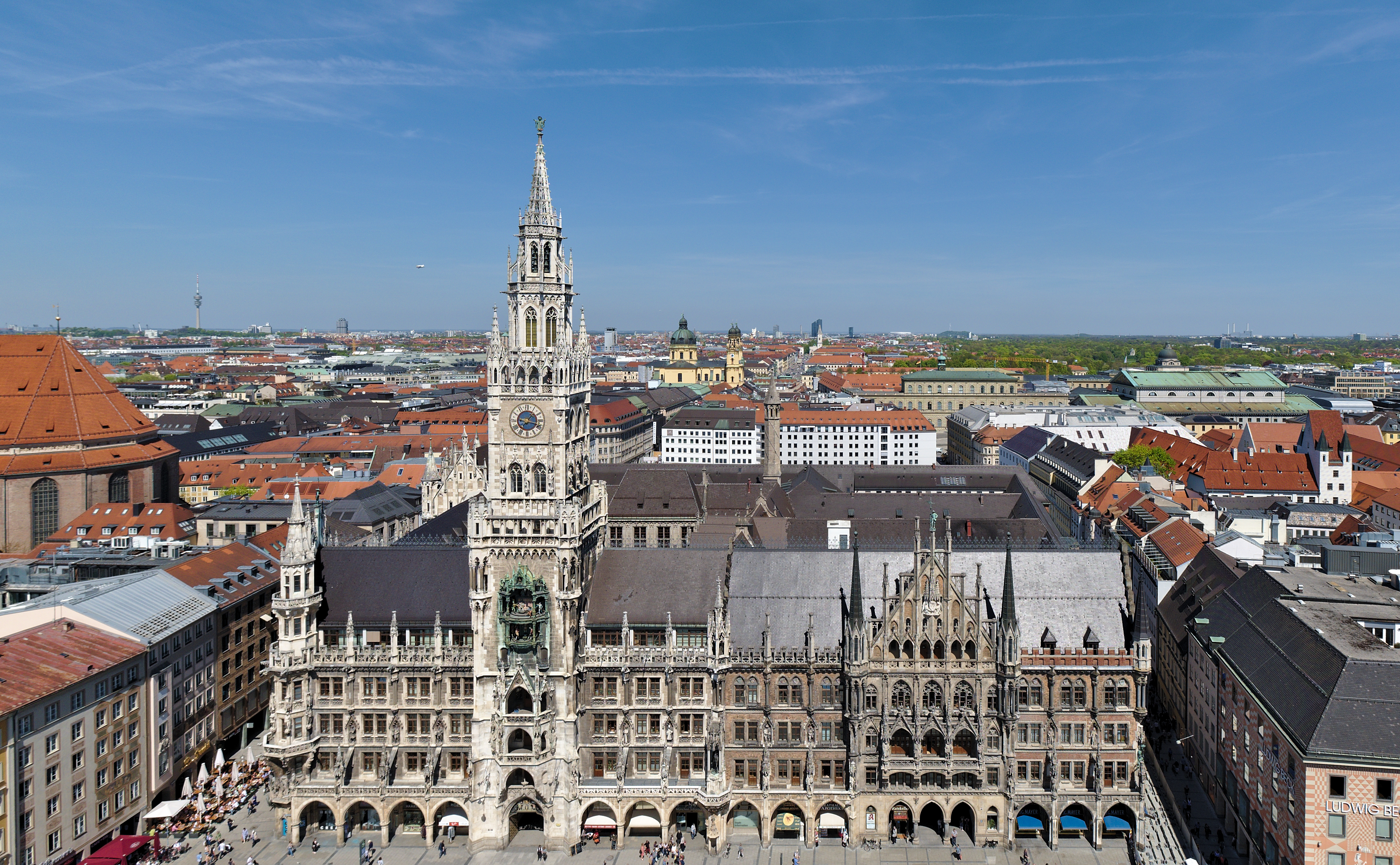
- New Town Hall as seen from the Marienplatz side

General information
- Type: Town hall
- Architectural style: Gothic Revival
- Location: Munich, Germany

The New Town Hall (German: Neues Rathaus) is a town hall that forms the northern part of Marienplatz in Munich, Bavaria, Germany. It hosts the city government including the city council, offices of the mayors and a small portion of the administration. In 1874 the municipality left the Old Town Hall for its new domicile.

== History ==
=== Inception and construction ===
The decision to construct a new building came due to the lack of space in the Old Town Hall and the adjoining, so-called "Lesser Town Hall" on Petersbergl (destroyed in 1944, not reconstructed). In memory of the bourgeois high season during the Gothic period, the choice fell upon a neo-Gothic design, which allowed to implement an independent architectural accent in contrast to the buildings of the royal family.

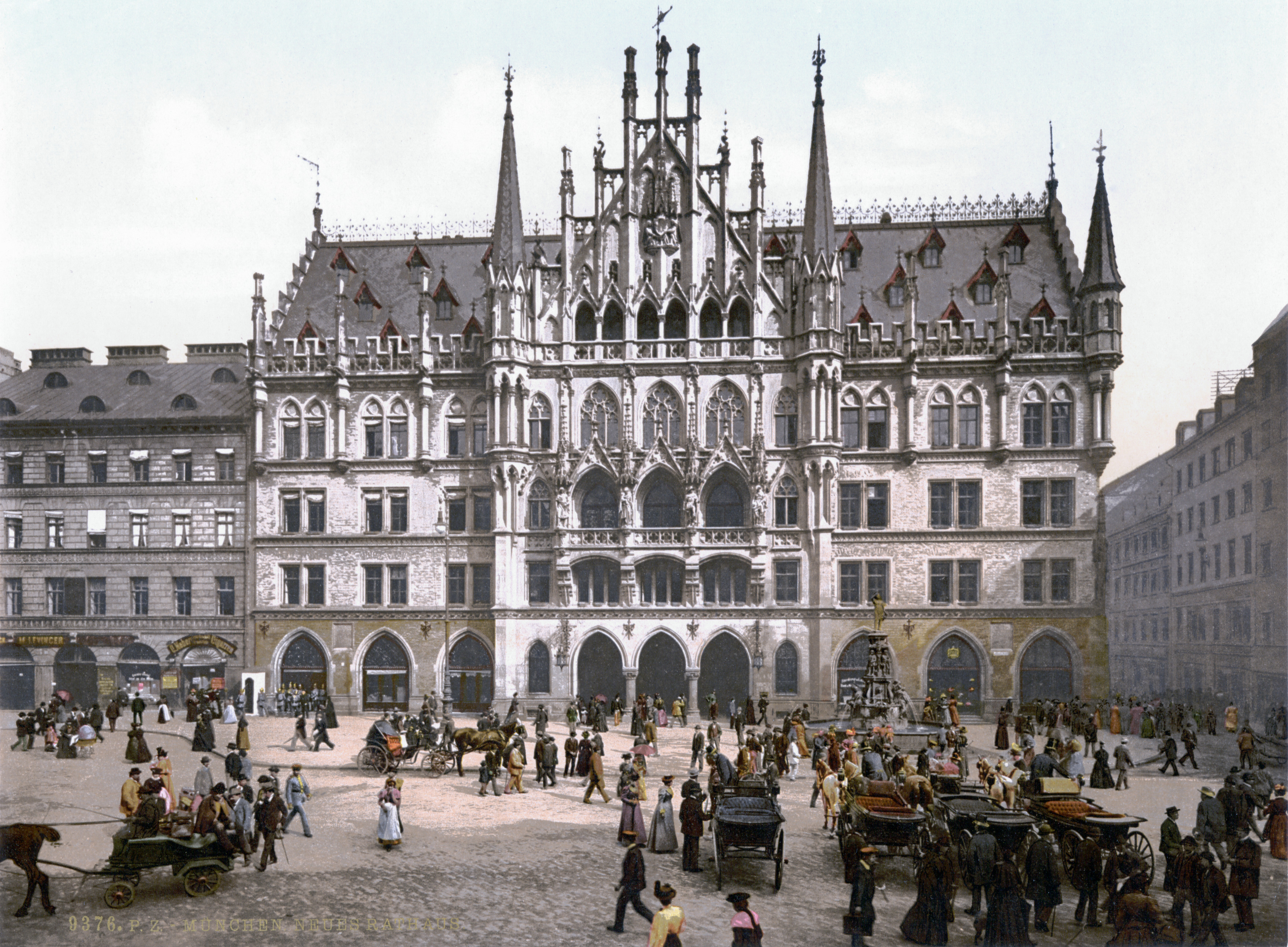
The New Town Hall as it looked until the extension of 1898–1905

The north side of the Marienplatz was chosen as the building site, where the house of the Landstände still stood which had been erected by the Bavarian Duke throughout the Middle Ages as a sort of representation of the opposing Landstände. The first section of the building in the eastern part of the Marienplatz, on the corner of Dienerstrasse, was the results of an idea competition won by Georg Hauberrisser and carried out between 1867 and 1874. When it became clear that this new building would not be able to accommodate the entire administration, the city began purchasing all the properties on the Dienerstrasse, Landschaftstrasse and Weinstrasse adjacent to the Town Hall starting in 1887. From 1889 to 1892, the section on the corner of Dienerstrasse and Landschaftstrasse was constructed.

In 1897, the Magistrate and municipal council decided to extend the buildings on the Marienplatz as well as the Weinstrasse and Landschaftstrasse to create a four-sided complex. For this, the entire area between the Marienplatz and Landschaftstrasse was used and on the other side, between Weinstrasse and Dienerstrasse. In 1898, the work for the extension began with the tower (Rathausturm), also under architect Georg von Hauberrisser. In December 1905, the shell of the third building section was finished with the setting of the keystone on the Rathausturm. For the architectural design of the Munich Rathausturm, Hauberrisser was clearly inspired by Brussels' Town Hall, whose 96-meter Brabantine Gothic tower was built by Jan van Ruysbroeck in the years 1449 to 1455. By the end of 1906, the offices were handed over. The façade area in the Marienplatz was then 98.5 meters long, of which 48 meters belong to the first construction section. Examples that were used for the design were the Town Hall in Brussels and the City Hall in Vienna.

=== 20th century – present ===
The minimal damages to the New Town Hall that occurred during the air raids on Munich in 1944, were able to be rebuilt after the war. The portion constructed at the Marienplatz received an additional floor, which were hidden behind the neo-Gothic balustrade so that the building's image was preserved. The façade on the Landschaftstrasse was very simply restored. At the end of the 1990s, the New Town Hall was rebuilt and reconstructed identically, including the neo-Gothic ornaments, which crown the roof.

== Dimensions and location ==
The building covers an area of 9,159 m^{2} having 400 rooms. The 100 meter-long main facade towards the Marienplatz is richly decorated. It shows the Guelph Duke Henry the Lion, and almost the entire line of the Wittelsbach dynasty in Bavaria and is the largest princely cycle in a German town hall. The central monument in the center of the main facade between the two phases at Marienplatz above the guard house, is an equestrian statue of Prince Regent Luitpold. The bay of the tower contains statues of the first four Bavarian kings.

The main facade is placed toward the square, while the back side is adjacent to a small park (Marienhof). The basement is almost completely occupied by a large restaurant called Ratskeller. On the ground floor, some rooms are rented for small businesses. Also located in the ground floor is the major official tourist information.

The first floor hosts a big balcony towards the Marienplatz which is used for large festivals such as football championships or for concerts during the Weihnachtsmarkt. Its main tower has a height of 85 m and is available for visitors with an elevator. On the top sits the Münchner Kindl. The Rathaus-Glockenspiel, performed by an apparatus daily at 11am, 12pm and 5pm, is a tourist attraction.

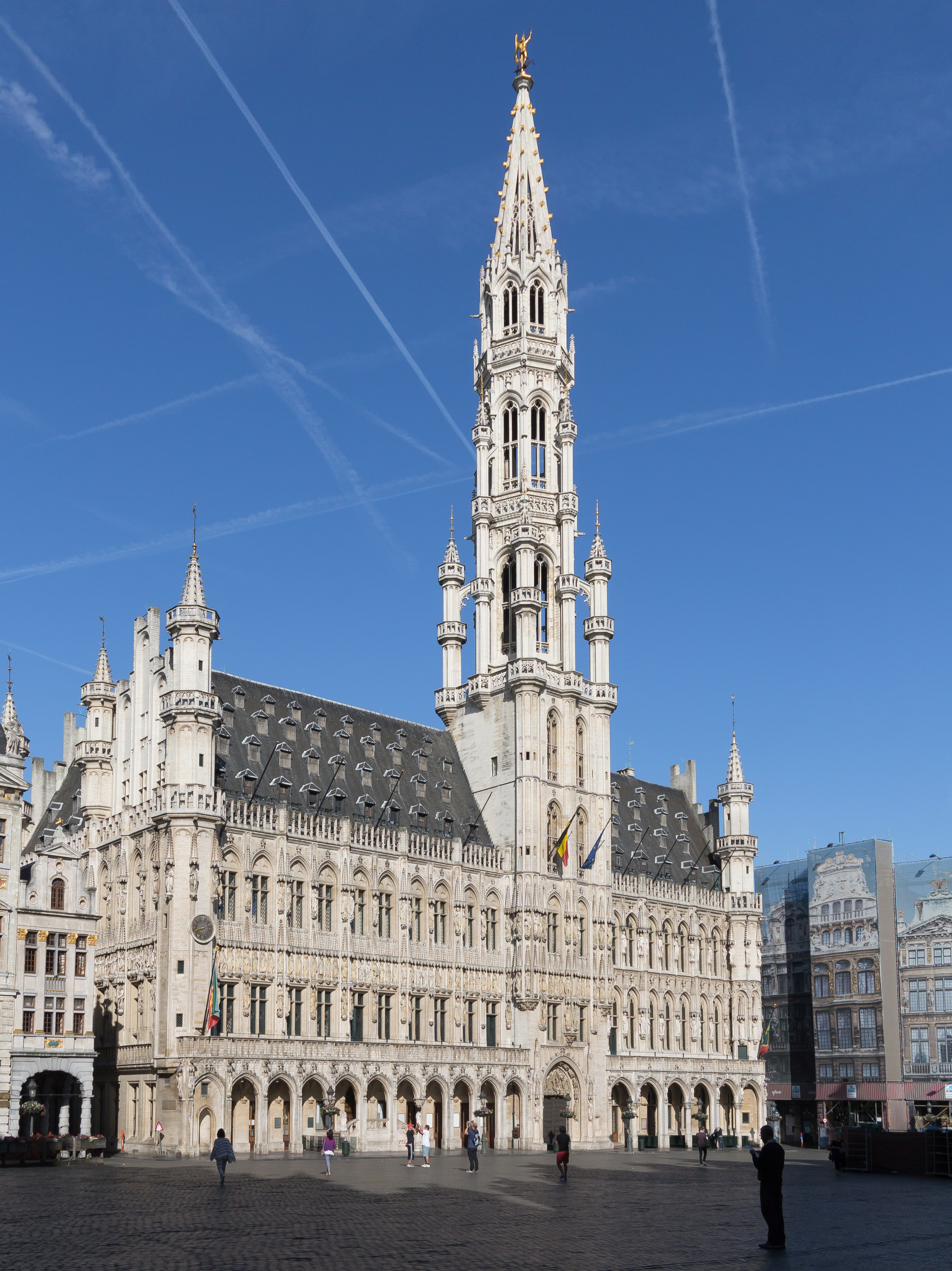
Brussels' Town Hall was used as an architectural example for Munich's New Town Hall.

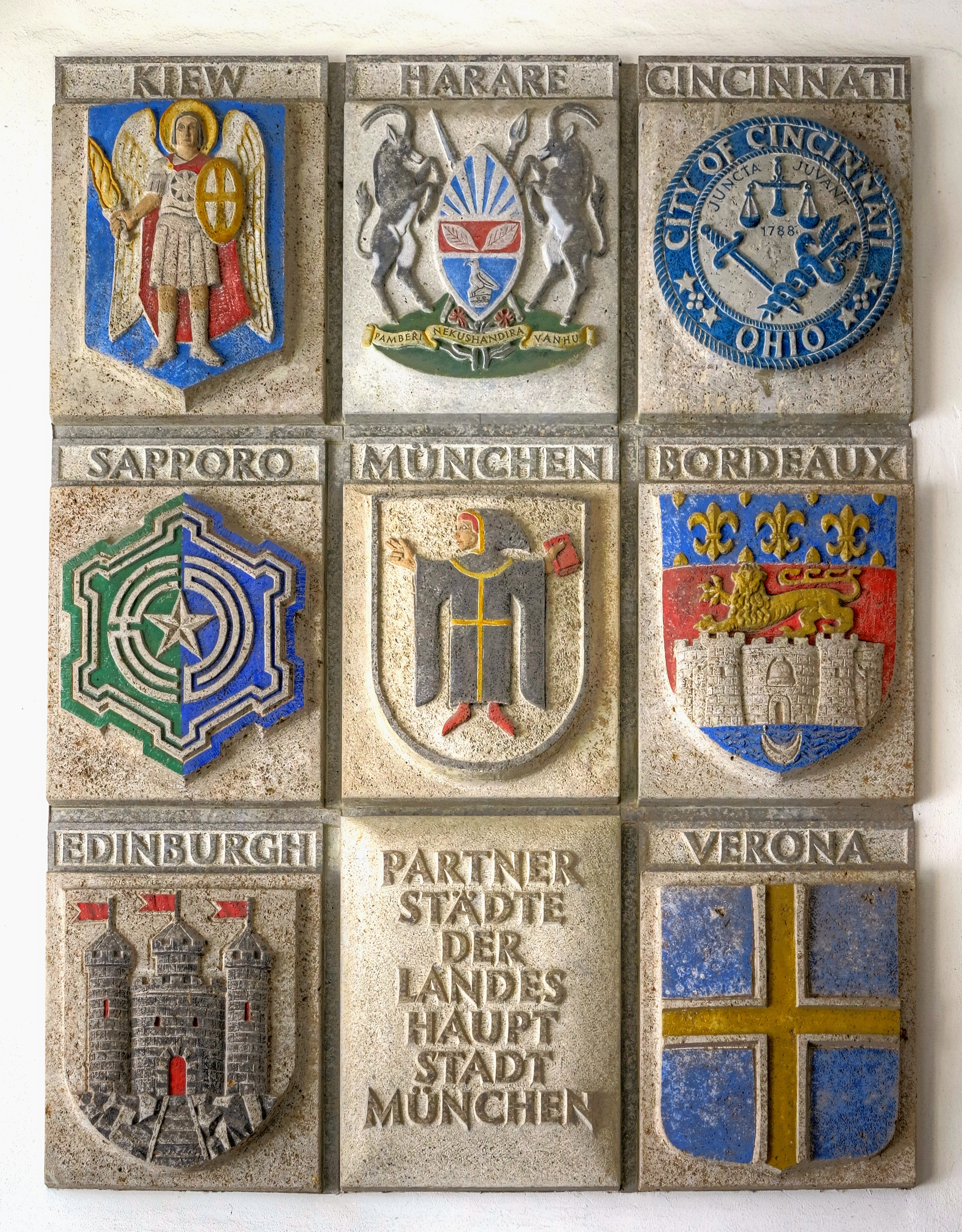
Relief of Munich's partner cities in the entrance hall of the New Town Hall

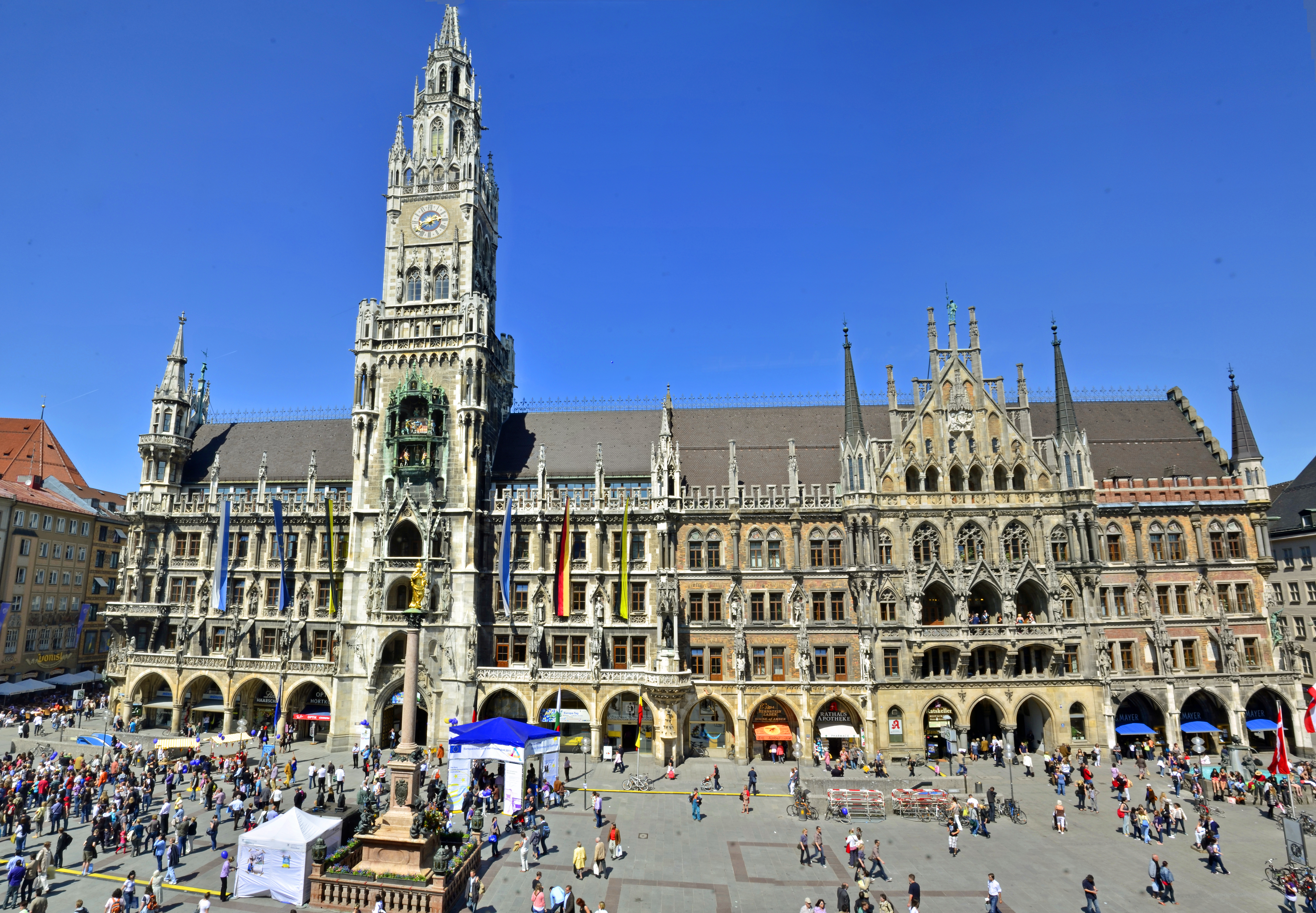
The New Town Hall's southern front

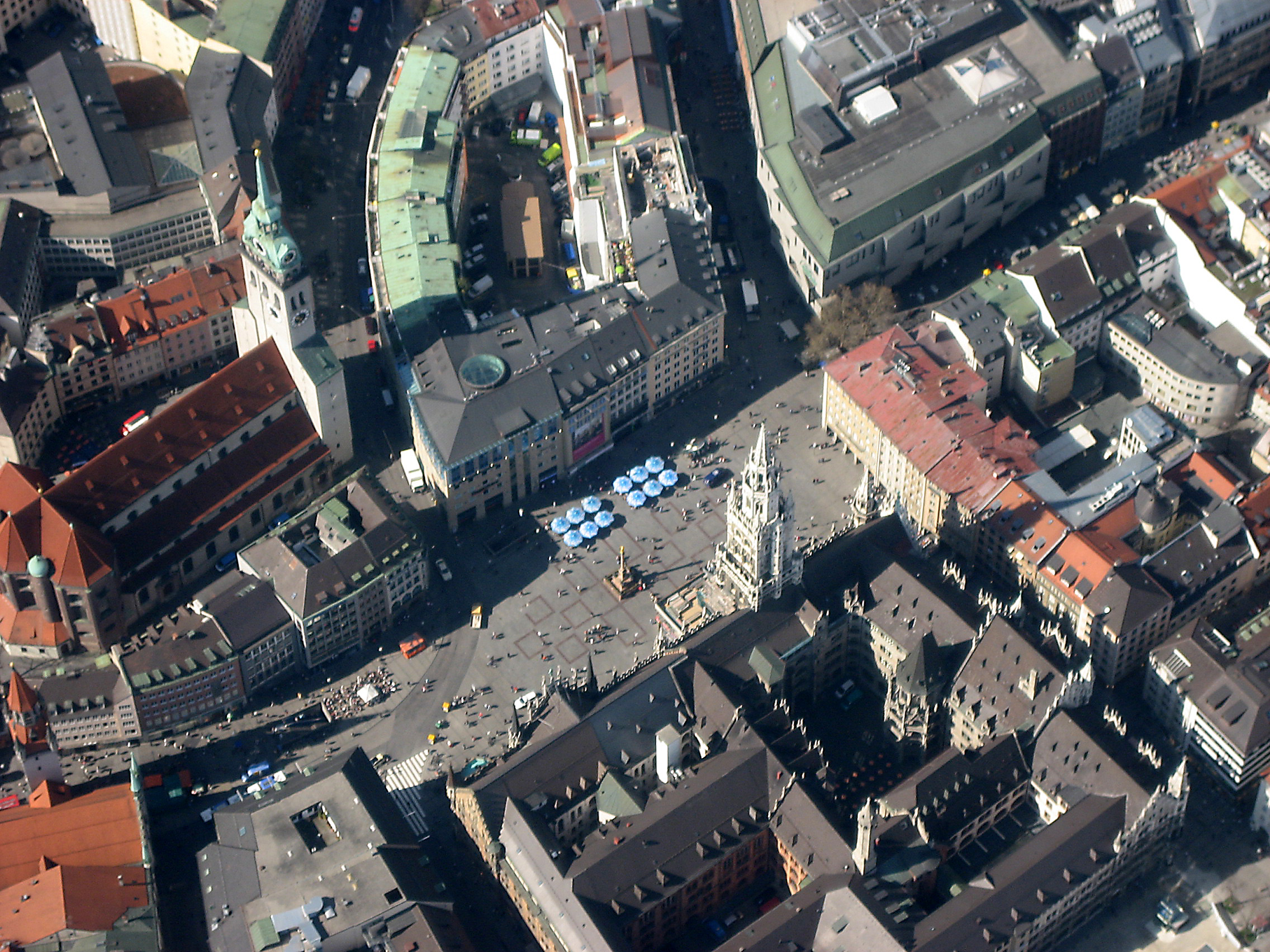
The location of the New Town Hall directly at Marienplatz

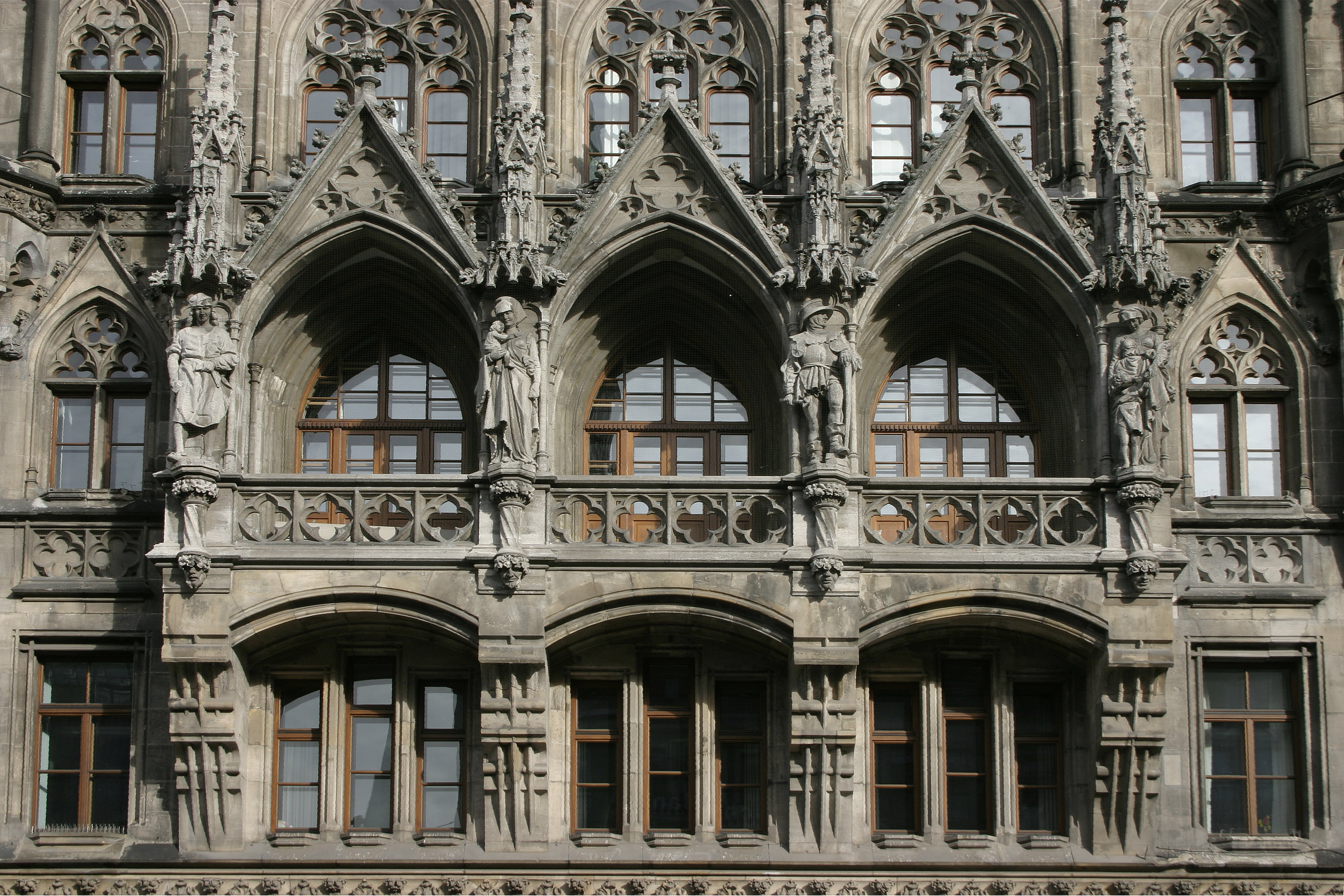
Detail of the front façade above the main entrance

== Description ==
=== Architectural design ===
Conference Rooms – Hallways – Staircase

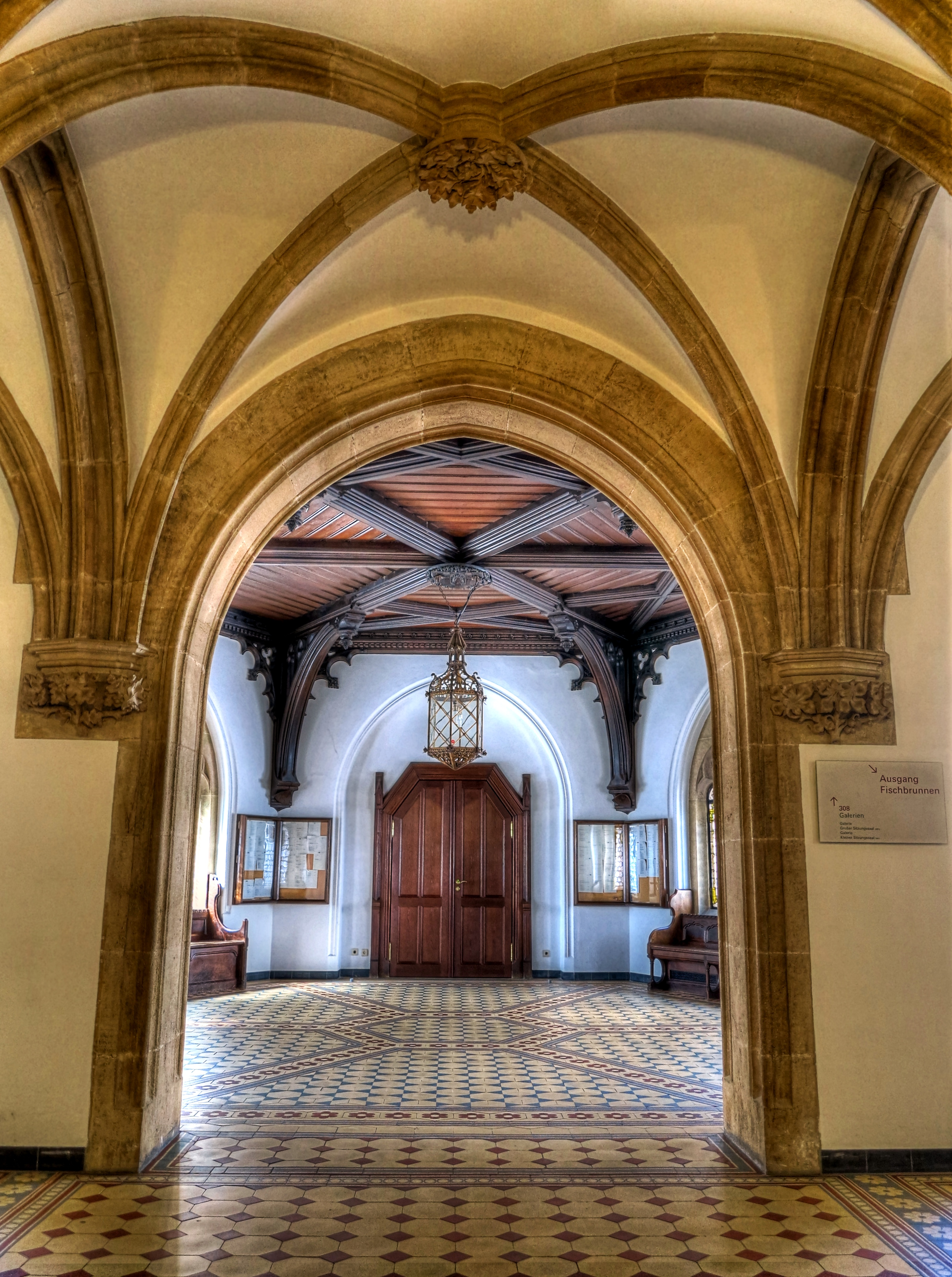
New Town Hall Munich, access to the Gallery of the Grand Session Hall

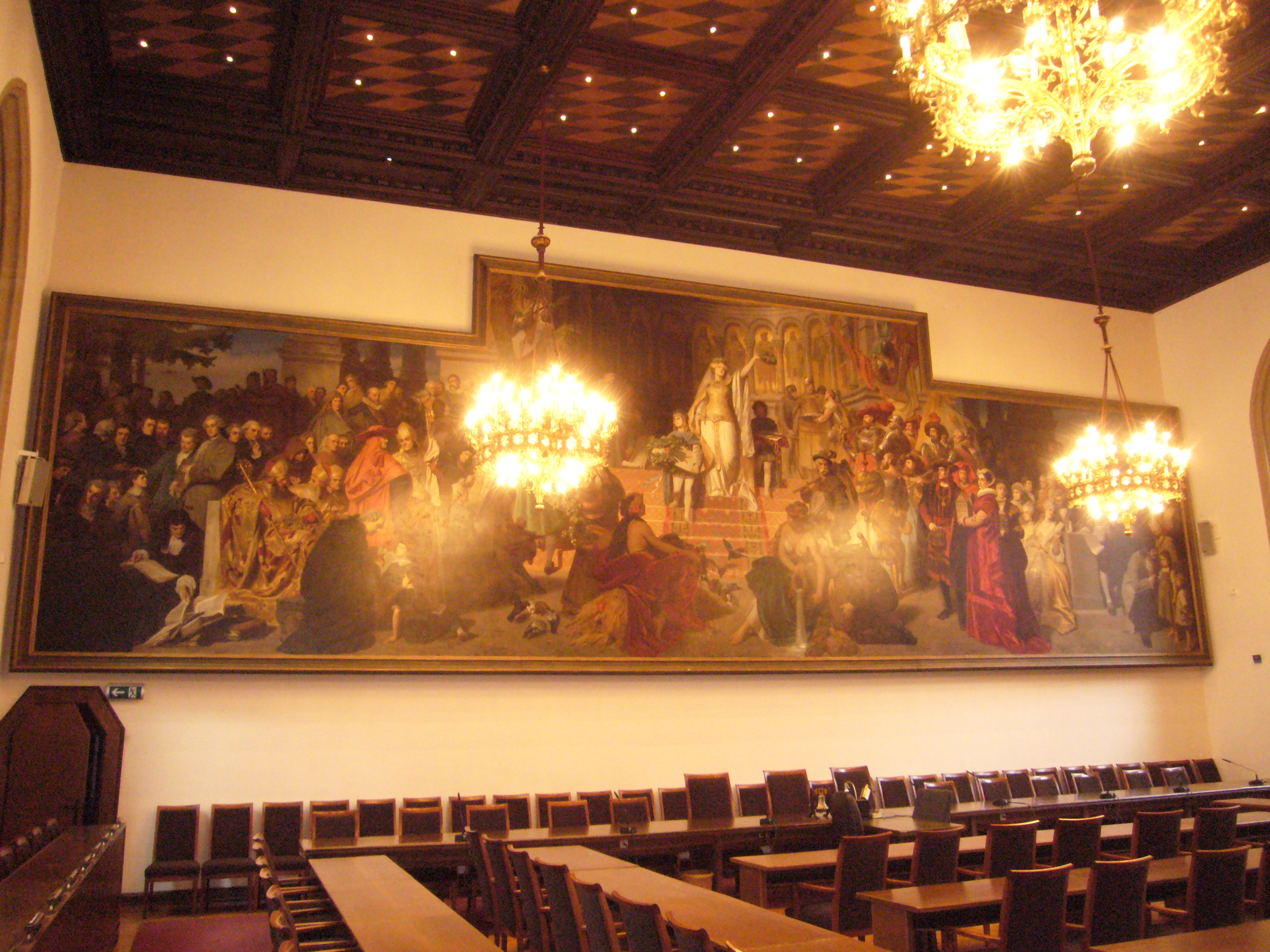
New Town Hall Munich, Large Conference Hall with the painting "Monachia" by Karl von Piloty from the years 1869–1879, removed in 1952, and rehung in 2004, dimensions: 6 × 17 m, cost of purchase: 50,000 Guilders

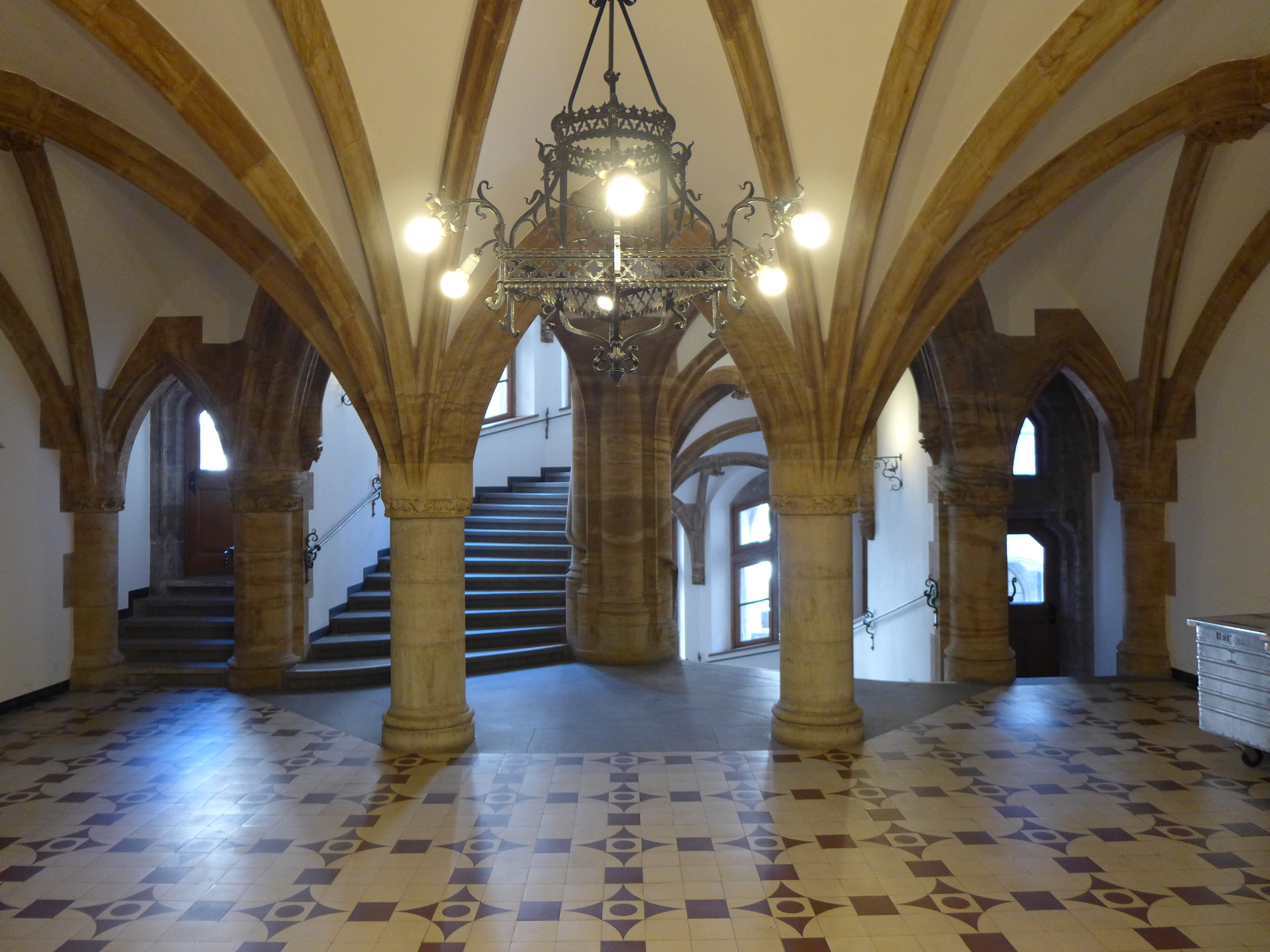
New Town Hall Munich, Spiral Stairs ("Treppe der Lebensalter"), Interior

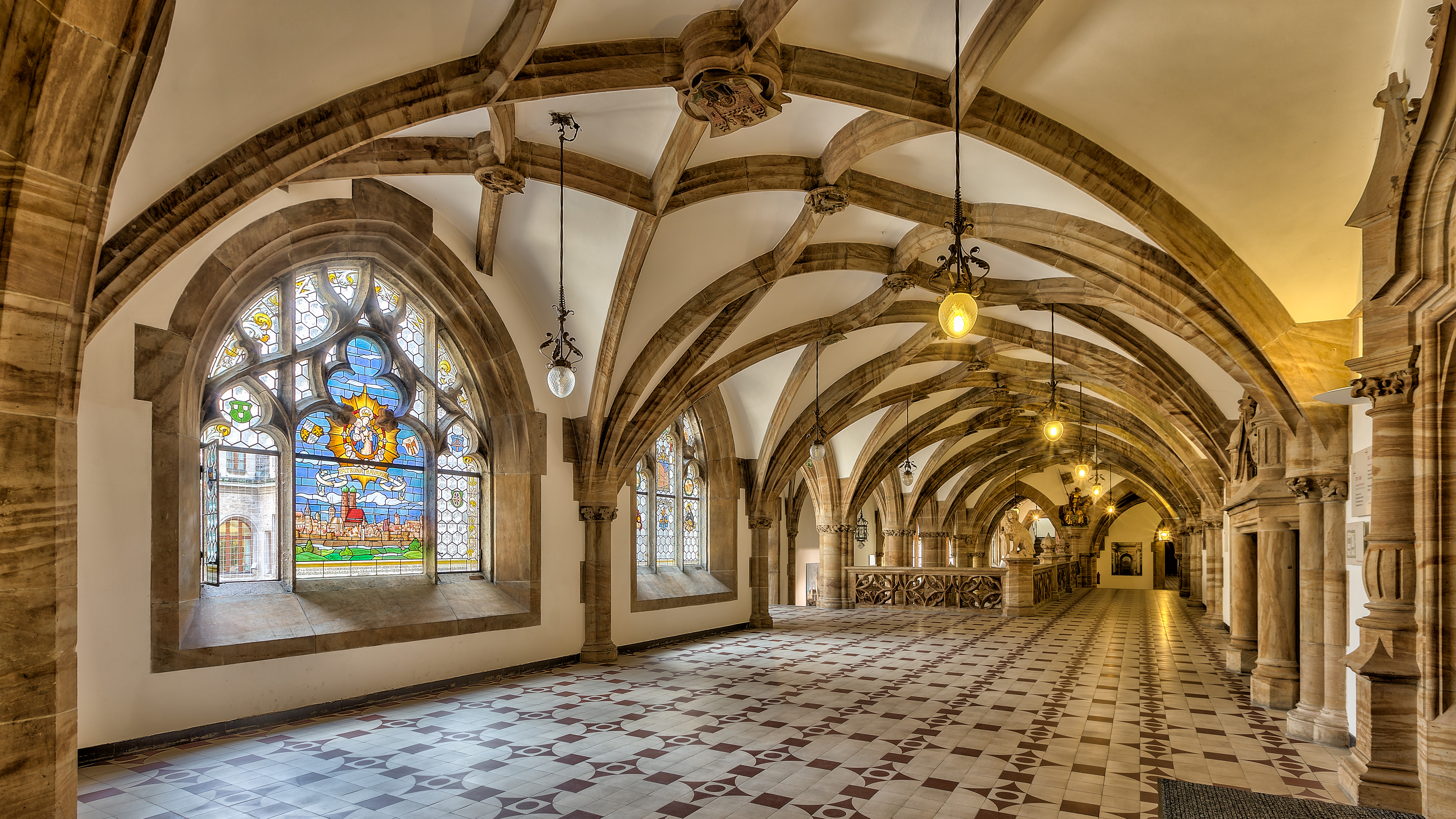
Hallway and window view in the New Munich Town Hall

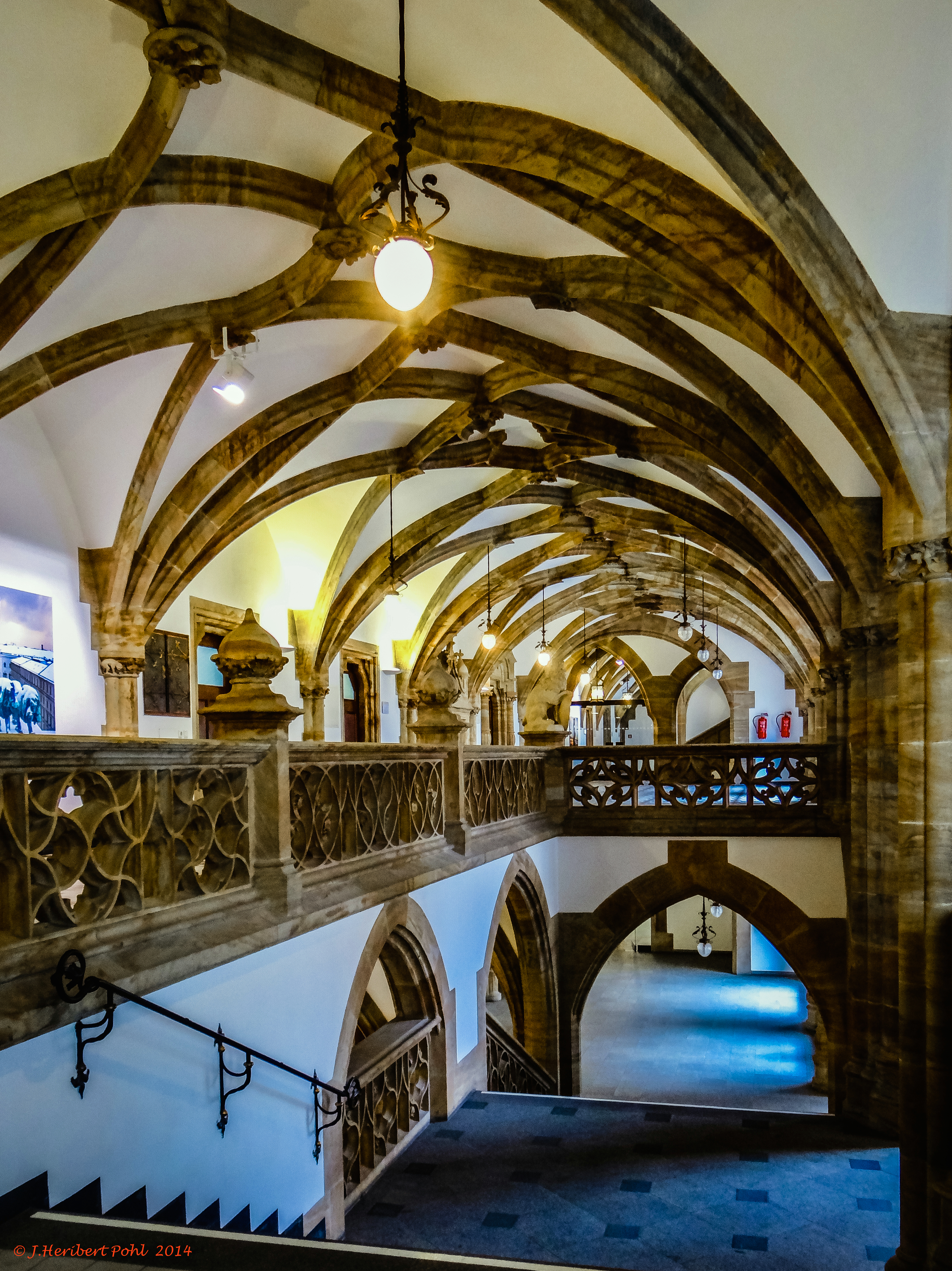
New Town Hall Munich, hallway and staircase

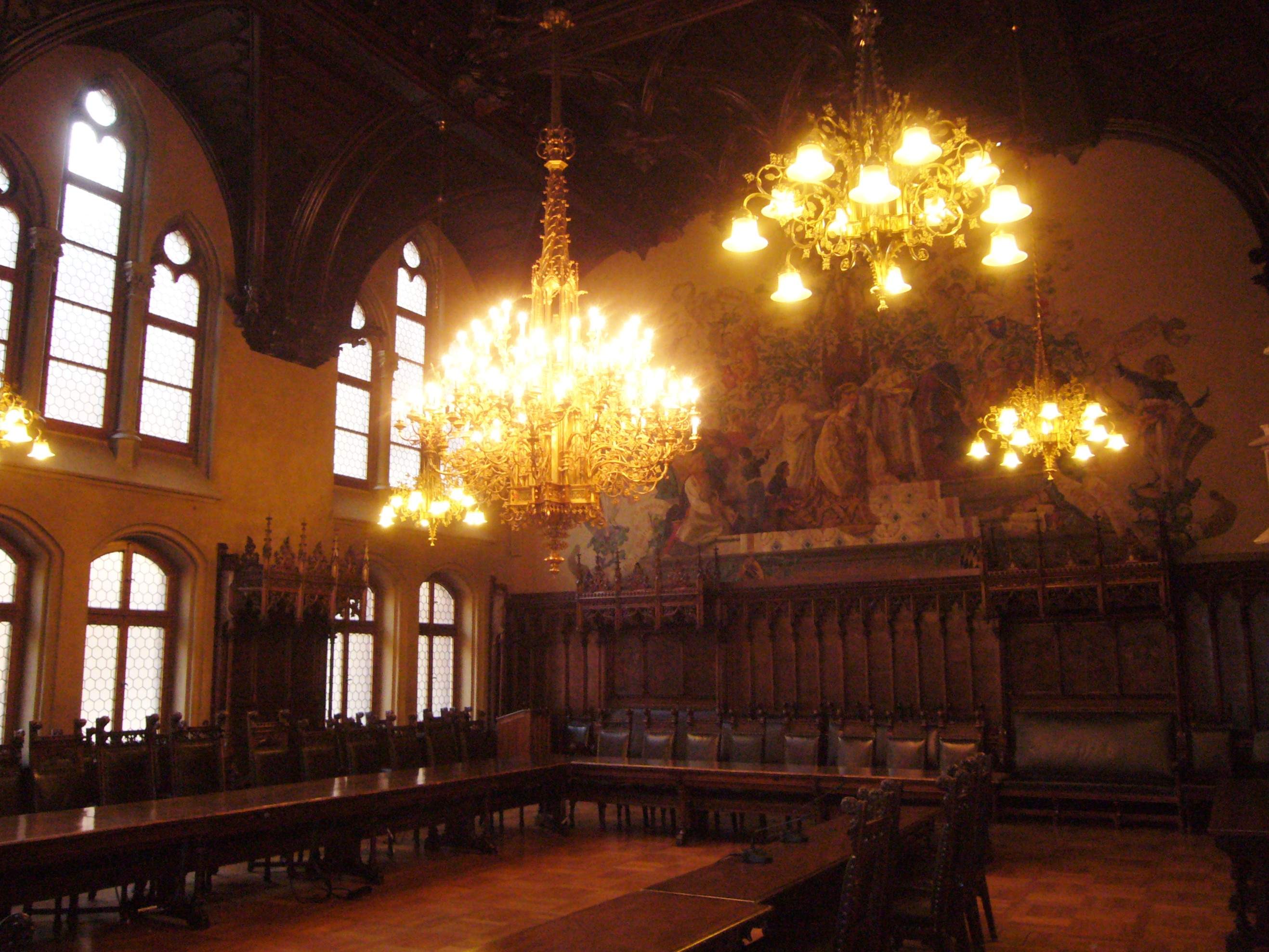
New Town Hall Munich, small conference room of the Magistrate with wall painting "The coronation of Monachia – Munich's flourishing under Ludwig I. in art and science" by Wilhelm Lindenschmit d. J. (1888)

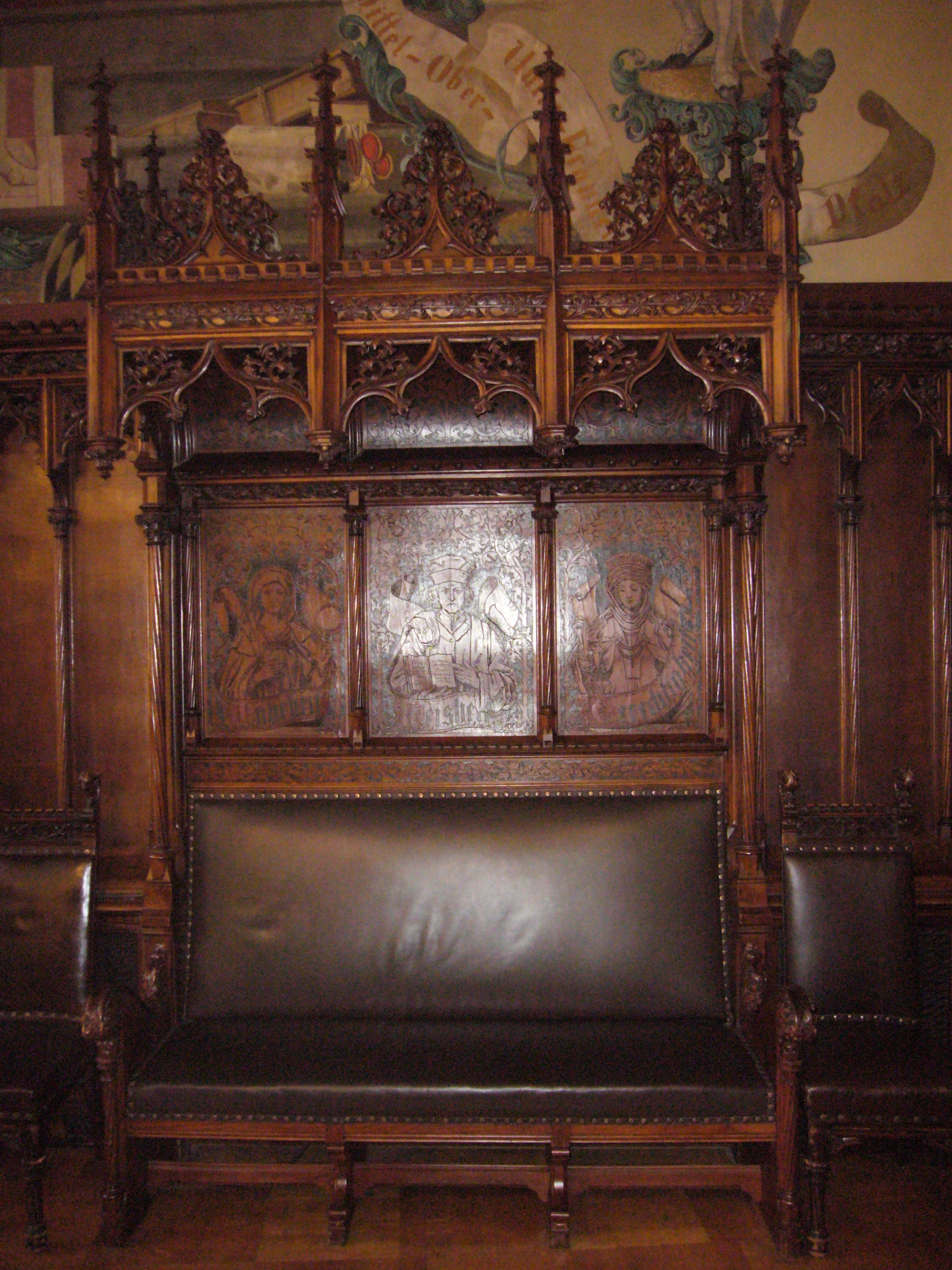
New Town Hall Munich, Small conference room, neo-Gothic stools by August Spieß with modern covers

The complex of brick and shell limestone has six courtyards, built on an area of 9,159 m^{2} where the building covers 7,115 m^{2}. The almost 100-meter-long main façade leading to Marienplatz is richly decorated. It shows Guelph Duke Henry the Lion and almost the entire line of the House of Wittelsbach rule in Bavaria and is the most extensive Princely cycle at a German Town Hall. As a central monument in the middle of the main façade, between the two building sections on the Marienplatz above the guardhouse, is a statue of the Prince Regent Luitpold. On the main façade of the Marienplatz and on that of the Weinstrasse are Munich’s founders, neo-Gothic water fountains in the form of grimaces and masks, allegorical images, and themes from the life of saints and folk legends. The corner of Marienplatz and Weinstrasse is called Wurmeck, and the corner of Weinstrasse and Landschaftsstrasse is called Kleubereck.

Numerous glass windows with local, regional, national, international and religious motifs adorn the building. After most of the windows had been destroyed by the bombings during the final phase of the Second World War, most of the objects were restored to their original form with the help of donations.

The 85 m high Rathausturm is crowned by the Münchner Kindl, created by Anton Schmid, with his son Wiggerl (Ludwig Schmid-Wildy) as model. At the top of the tower is the fifth-largest clockwork in Europe, which was first heard in 1908. The 43 bells of the mechanical clock play successively four different melodies, to which a total of 32 figures represent the Schäfflertanz and a knights' tournament at the wedding of the Bavarian Duke William V and Renata of Lorraine in 1568. The melodies are changed over the course of the year, six different combinations of four songs are used. In the windows of the seventh tower a Munich night watchman appears blowing on his horn, as well as an angel blessing the Münchner Kindl. The Town Hall has 400 rooms, and the cellar is almost completely built as a restaurant: the Ratskeller.

=== New Munich Town Hall and Town Hall St. Johann Saarbrücken ===
Architectural comparisons of the Town Halls in Munich and St. Johann

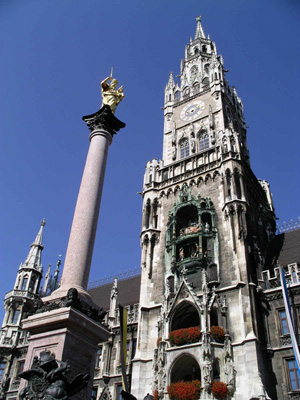
Town Hall and the Mariensäule on the Marienplatz

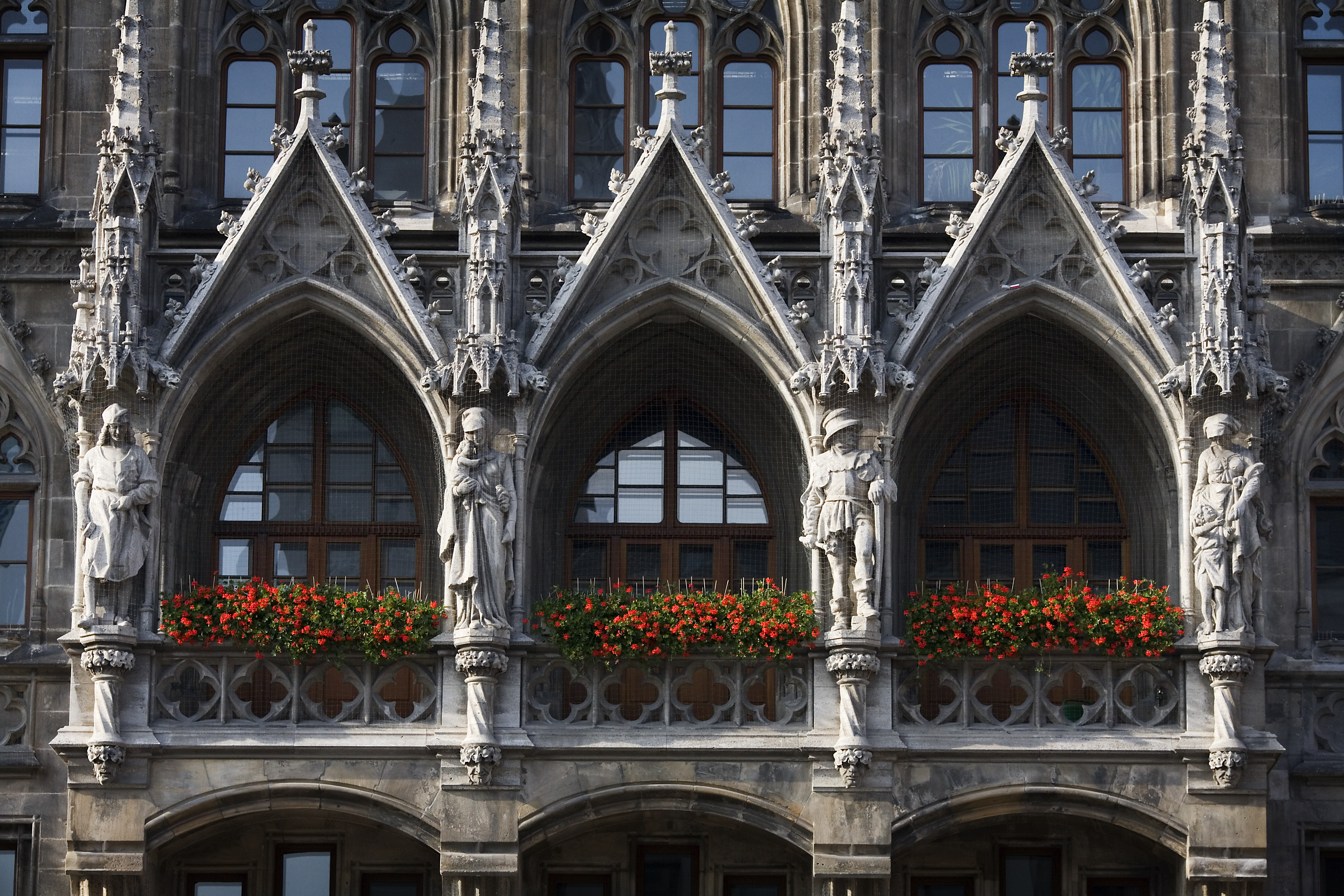
Munich, New Town Hall, First Construction Phase, Allegorical Statues v.l.n.r. Commercialism, domesticity, sponsorship, charity

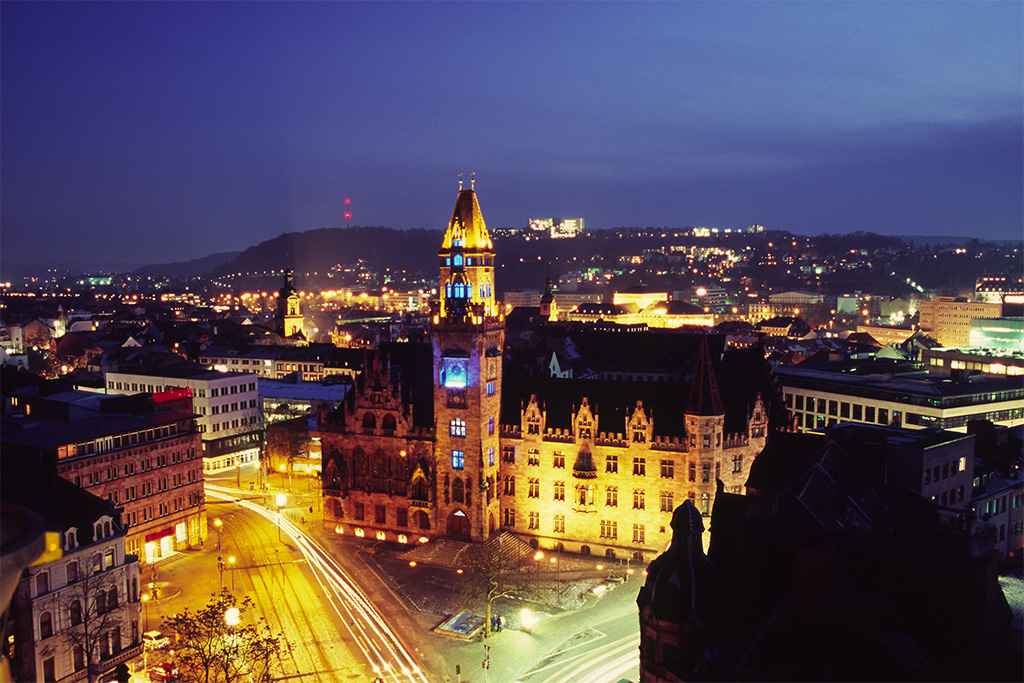
Town Hall St. Johann, façade

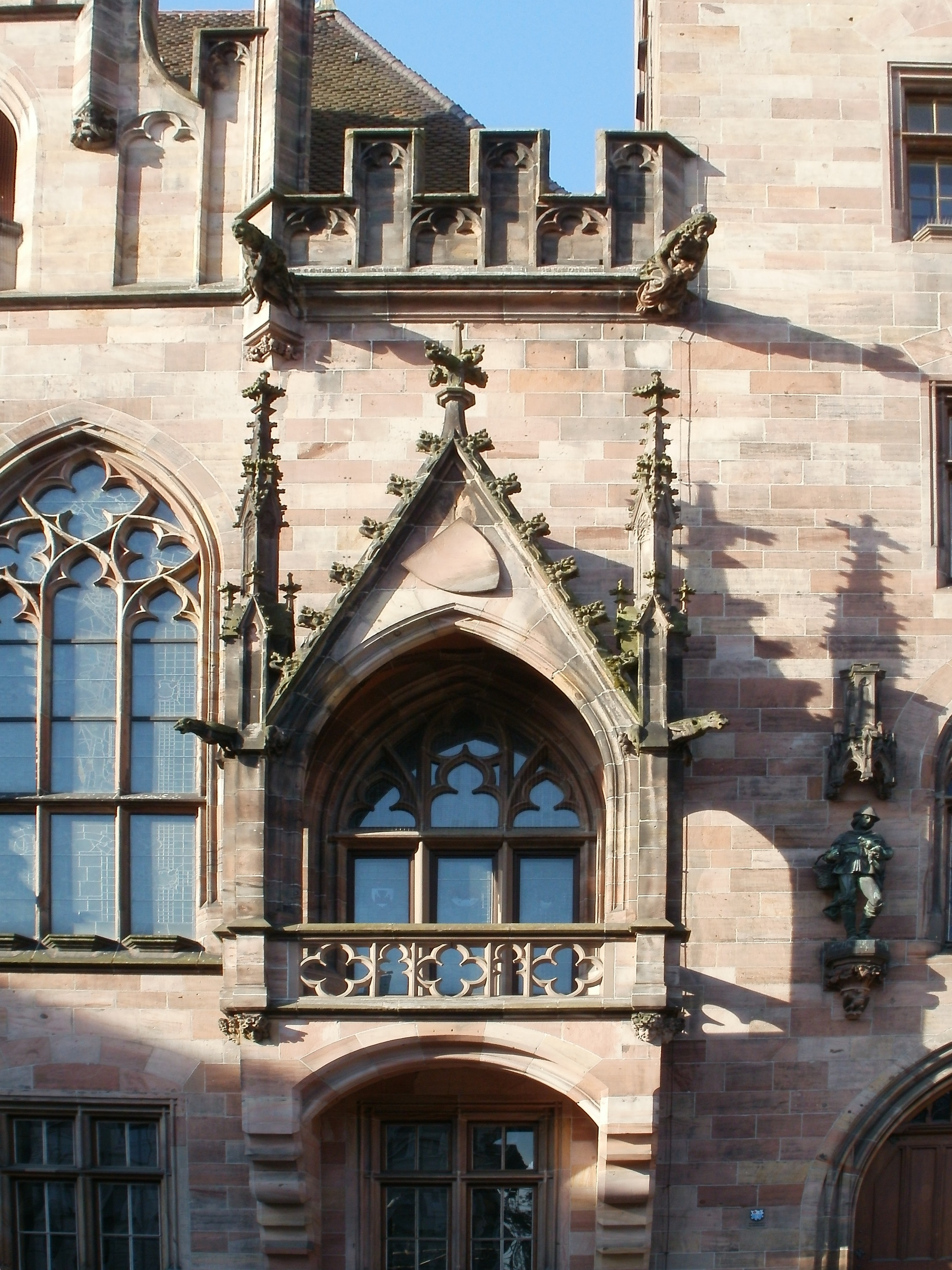
Town Hall St. Johann, balcony

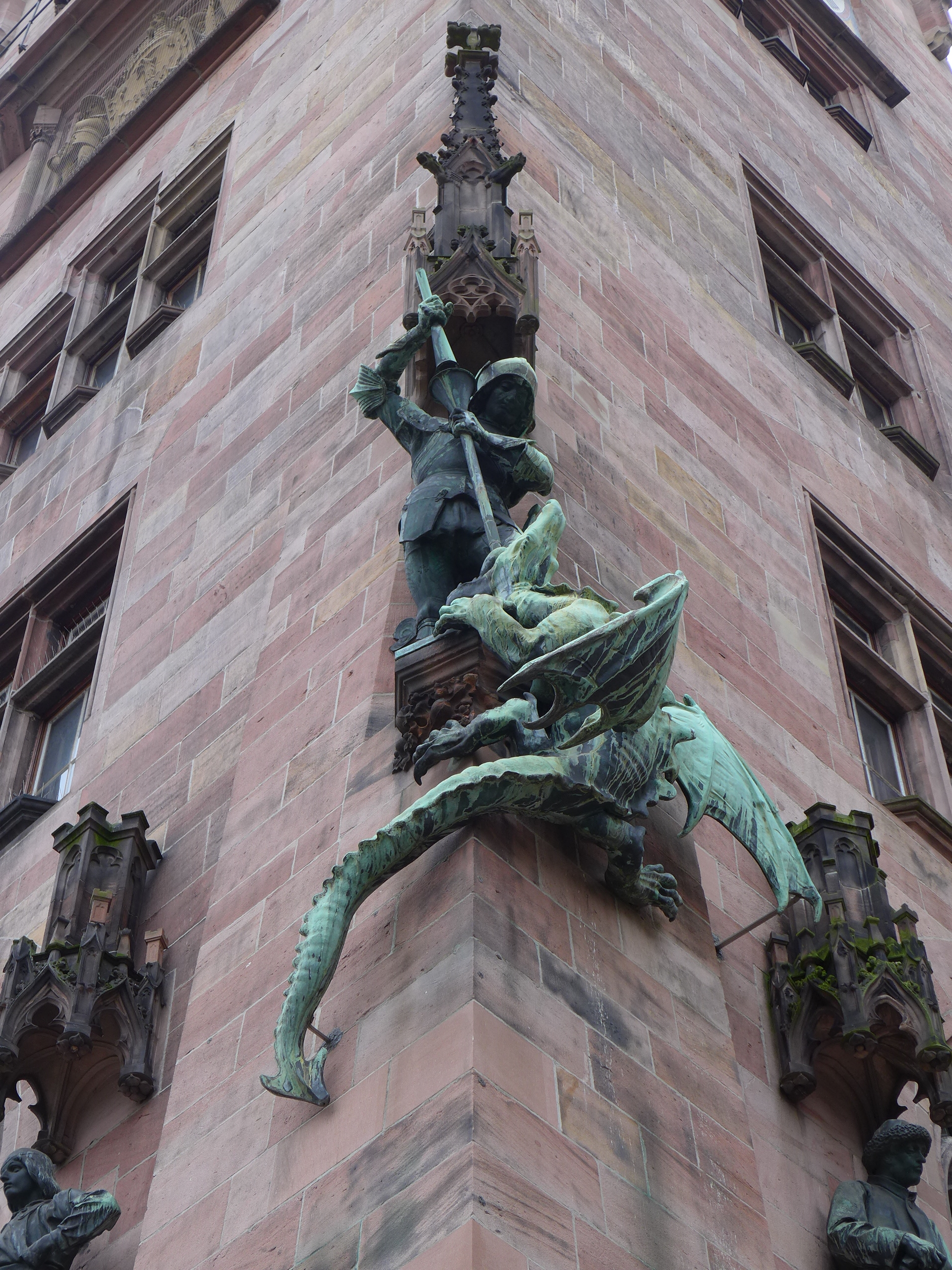
Town Hall St. Johann, St. Georg kills the dragon

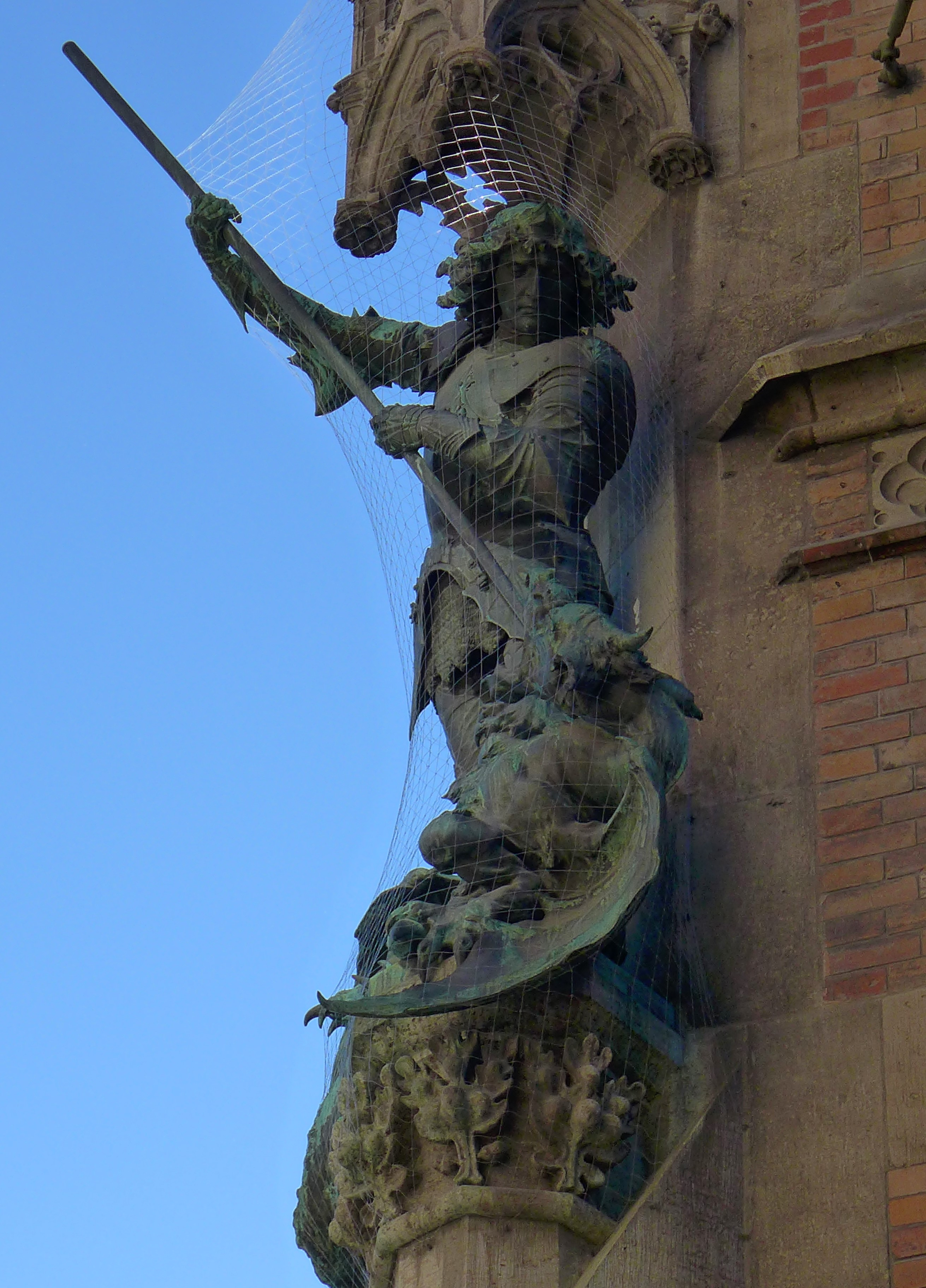
Syrius Eberle: Sculpture "The Battle of St. George with the Dragon", New Town Hall Munich, corner of Marienplatz and Dienerstrasse

The Town Hall façade of the Town Hall St. Johann shows unmistakable similarities with that of the new Munich Town Hall in its completed design of the years 1898–1905: On the one hand, the asymmetrical placement of the important architectural elements (tower, gable, bay window) and on the other hand, the shaping of the individual forms (balconies supported by massive consoles, encircling columns, paired arrangement of the windows, encircling tower balcony with corner turrets, figurine decorations).

However, Hauberrisser was able to design the façade of the Town Hall St. Johann in a single draft, making it more balanced than the new Munich Town Hall, erected in three construction sections (1st 1867–1881 / 2nd 1889–1892 / 3rd 1898–1905). At the Marienplatz façade of the Munich Town Hall, Hauberrisser also had to compete with combining two building sections with different heights, façade cladding and window designs, and therefore extended façade cladding and figurine decorations.

In contrast to the façade conception of the Viennese Town Hall of Hauberrisser's teacher Friedrich von Schmidt, Hauberrisser's facades in Munich and St. Johann are flat and are given life by the relief effect of balconies, oriels, columns, statues and decorations.

Both of Hauberrisser's facades (St. Johann and Munich) correspond to the type of construction design published in Berlin by the "Zentralblatt der Bauverwaltung": "a Town Hall on the Town Hall square with partial relation to the town center, fitting to the given area, creative, intimate, German Town Hall."

== Functions ==
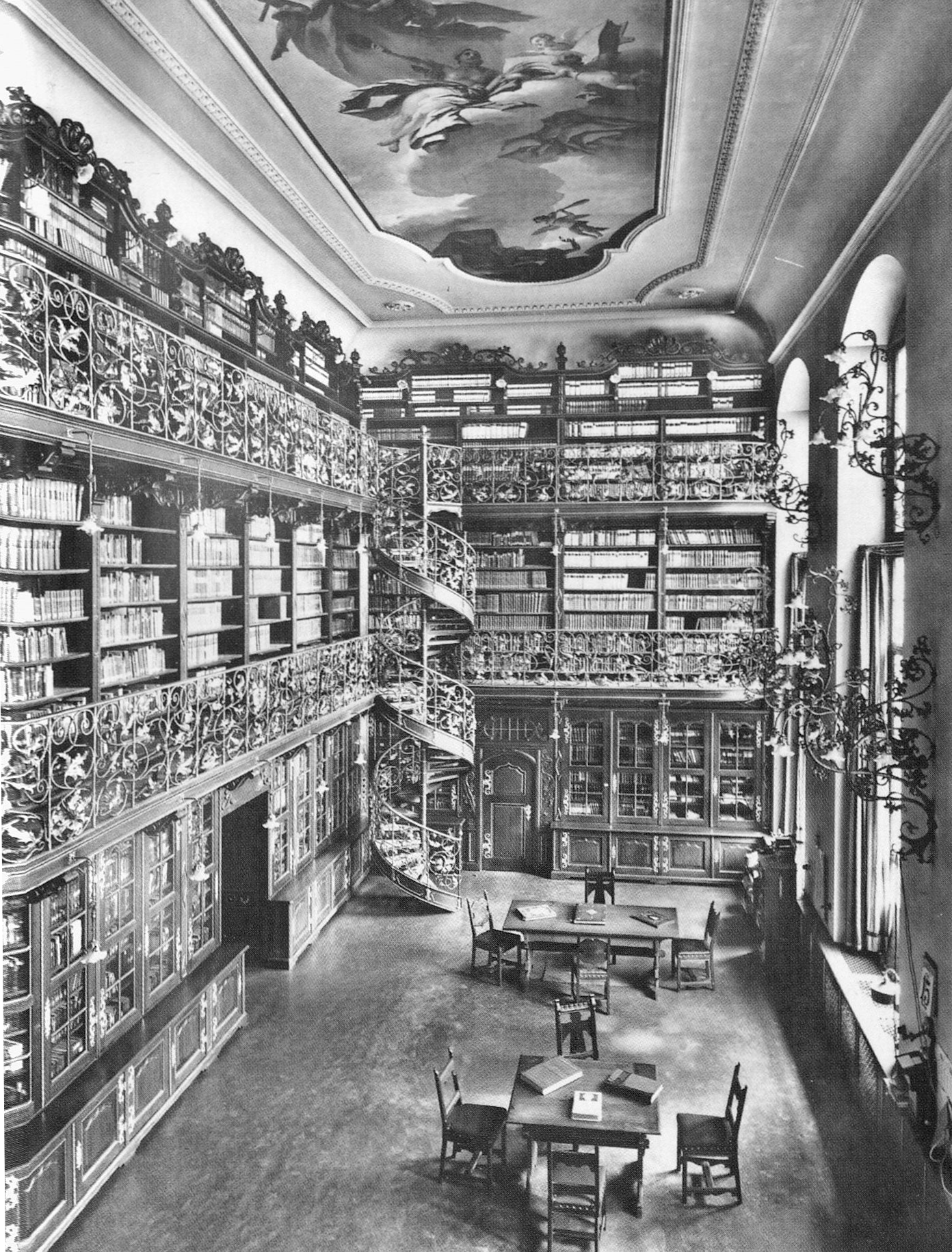
The legal library in 1909

The New Town Hall is the home of the Mayor and the city council, which has its conference room here. At the same time, the council factions and small parts of the city administration are accommodated in the New Town Hall. The richly decorated, art nouveau library hall was built to accommodate the Council's legal library and is still a publicly available legal library under the administration of the Munich City Library.

In the New Town Hall and in the Marienplatz, receptions and honors for successful athletes and teams are usually held. It is a special honor to look down upon the observers from the balcony of the Mayor’s office, which is located in the Rathausturm below the clock.

The Rathausturm has a viewing gallery below the peak, above the clock, which can be reached by a lift. From there on a clear day, it is possible to see the Alps, the Old Peter, the Holy Spirit Church, the Marienplatz, the Old Town Hall and the Talburgtor. In the North, it is possible to see the Theatinerkirche and the Olympiaturm. In the West it is possible to see the Frauenkirche and St. Paul's Church.

== Clock chimes and Night Watchman with Angel ==
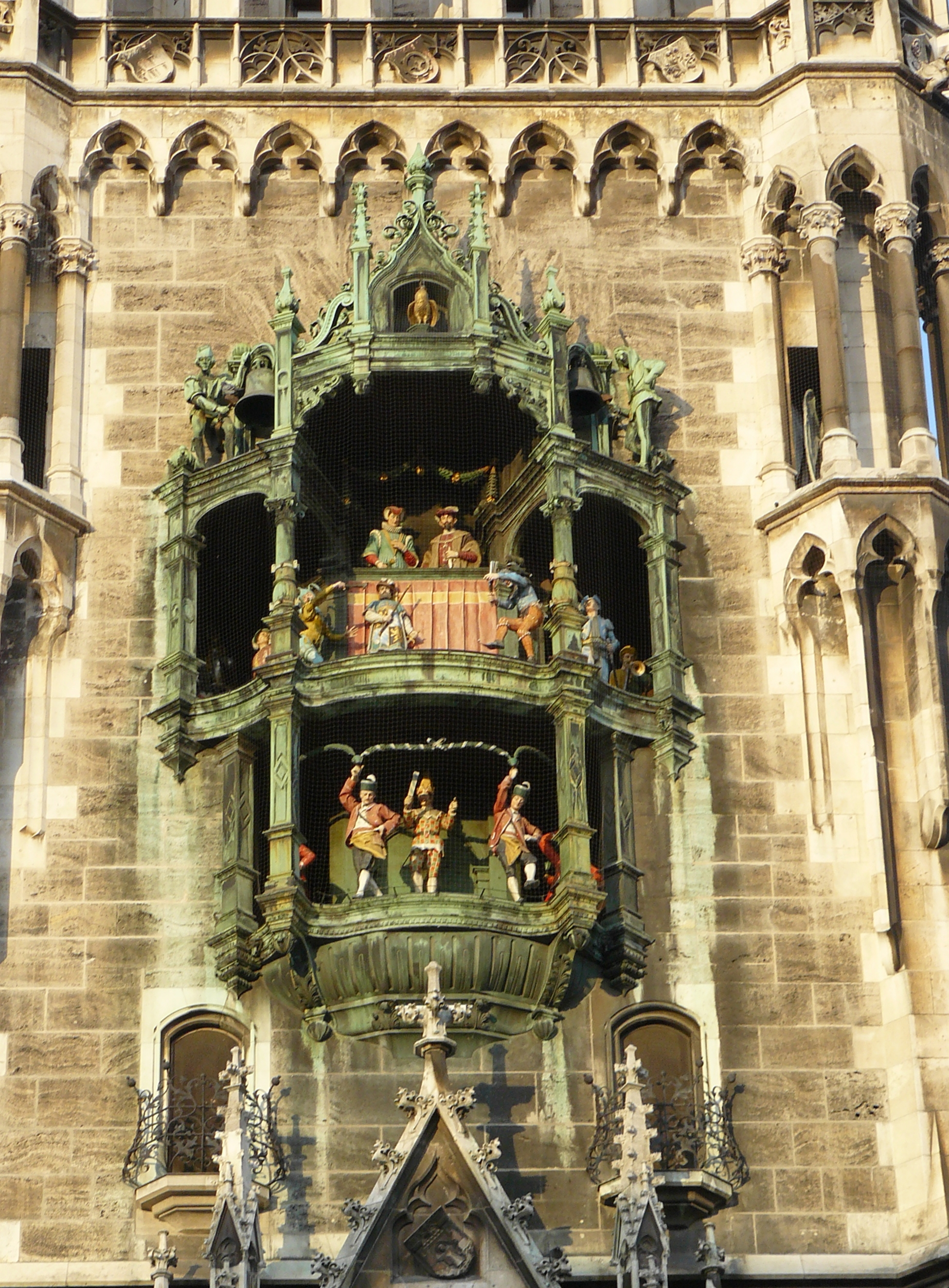
The clock chimes at the Munich New Town Hall

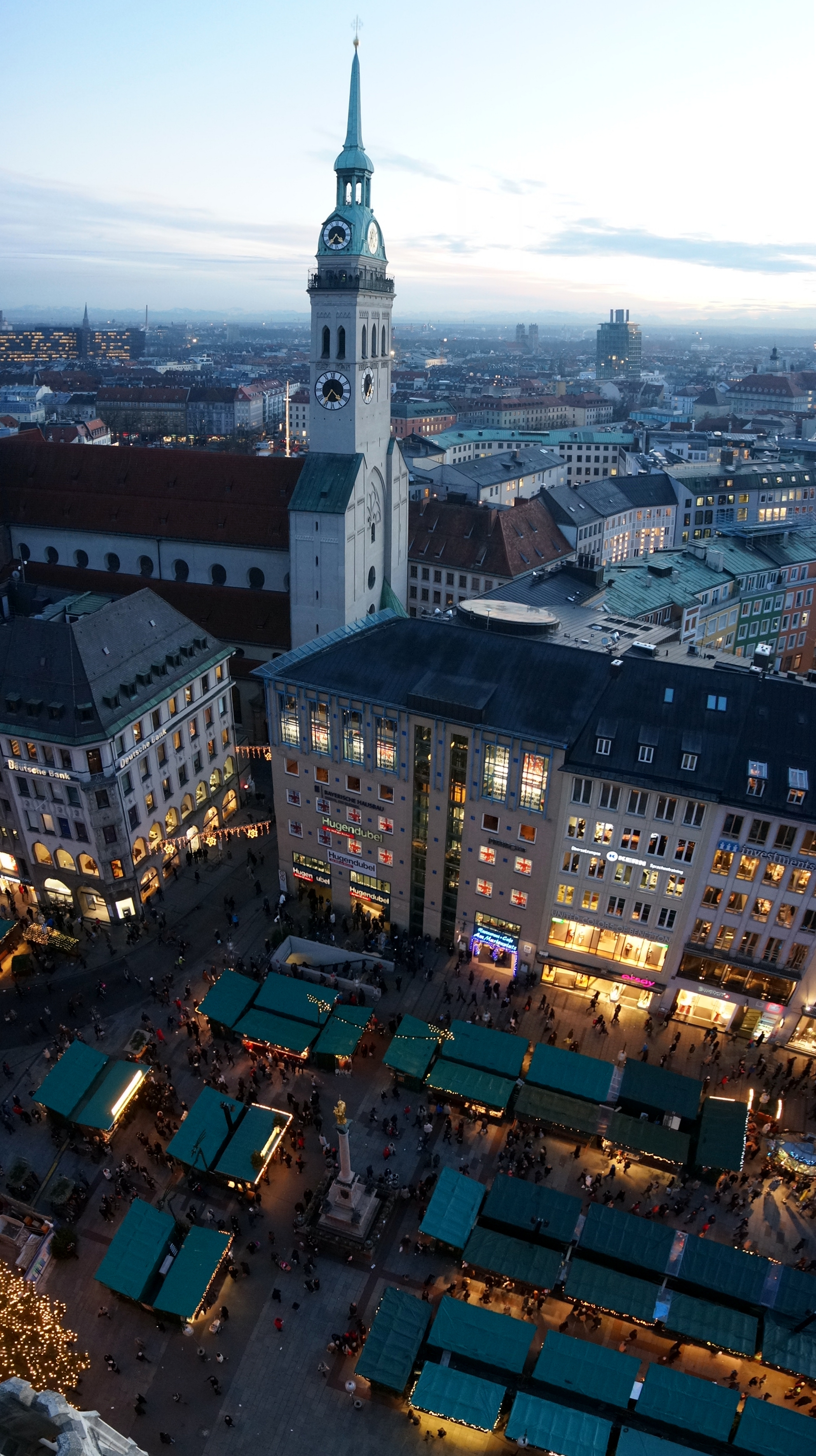
View from the Rathausturm to the Christkindlmarkt

Section of the bell play

The clock with 43 bells, which is triggered by six different reels according to season, plays daily at 11 and 12 o'clock and from March to October at 5 o'clock. The actual gears are located under the tower helmet and can be played individually with a keyboard. The smallest of the bells weighs 10 kg and has a diameter of 18 cm, the largest weighs 1,300 kg with a diameter of 125 cm; the total weight of the bells is 7,000 kg.

The nave, which houses the clock chimes, is covered in copper. The 32 figures refer to motifs from the history and legend of Munich. The kinematic arrangement was developed in 1899 by Christian Reithmann. In the upper portion of the nave, a "tournament" is staged, which was originally held in the Marienplatz in 1568 for the marriage of Duke William V and Renata of Lorraine. Heroes, jesters, cheering fans, pagans, and standard carriers lined the tournament field on which Bavarians and Lorraineers challenged their strengths through medieval games. The fact that the white-blue Bavaria won over the black-yellow of Lorraine can only be interpreted symbolically. In the lower floor, the "Schäfflertanz" is displayed, which reminisces on the plague from 1515 to 1517. When no one dared to leave their homes, in fear of the plague, the Schäffler, with their dancing and playing of music, were supposed to lure the frightened citizens back into the streets and therefore back "into life".

There is also a two-minute variant in the late evening, at 9 pm, where spotlights illuminate the two side bay windows. In the left window is the night watchman, who emerges and does his rounds. He wears a cloak, and carries a horn and a lantern, and his dog follows behind him. The bells accompany this by playing The Night Watch from Richard Wagner's Opera "Die Meistersinger von Nürnberg". After a short pause, the cradle song of Johannes Brahms plays, and in the right nave tower, the "Münchner Kindl" marches to the left, followed by the guardian angel (peace angel) (which is based on "a citizen’s child with a guardian angel" from Ignaz Günther which is in the Munich Bürgersaal of the Marian congregation). After both return to the tower, the light goes out. The night watchman and the guardian angel have laid the Munich child to rest, and Munich embraces the night.

The idea of integrating a clock chime into the tower of the New Town Hall goes back to Georg von Hauberrisser. The costs were substantial, the 43 bells costed 154,000 Goldmarks alone, in which 32,000 marks was donated by the furniture and antique dealer Karl Rosipal in 1904 for the centennial. This donation, however came with repercussions: Karl Rosipal, who died in 1924, was of Jewish origin, and in 1933/34 the donation was refunded to the family, since it was presumed that it was no longer desired to have Jewish participation in a German clock chime at the time. In 1908, the clock chime was completed, but was officially operational on 18 February 1909, due to the unsatisfactory sound of the bells. Since then, the figures and the clockwork sound every day at eleven. The soundings at 12 and 5 pm have only existed since the Olympic Games in 1972. Between 1944 and 1952 its operation was limited, not because it had been destroyed in the war, but considerable repairs were necessary.

In the course of the repairs to the tower façade in 2006–2007, the bells were removed, cleaned and repaired. The bell holder was equipped with a suspension made of stainless steel, and other important parts were replaced including the springs and cables. The total renovation cost was 750,000 Euro, which was for the most part donations from the citizens of Munich (660,000 Euro), while the German Foundation for the Protection of Historical Monuments donated an additional 100,000 Euro. The bells were re-installed, revised, and tuned in time for the 850th birthday of the city of Munich in 2008.

The bells each play four melodies, which change monthly between a total of six different melodies.

== City Nativity ==
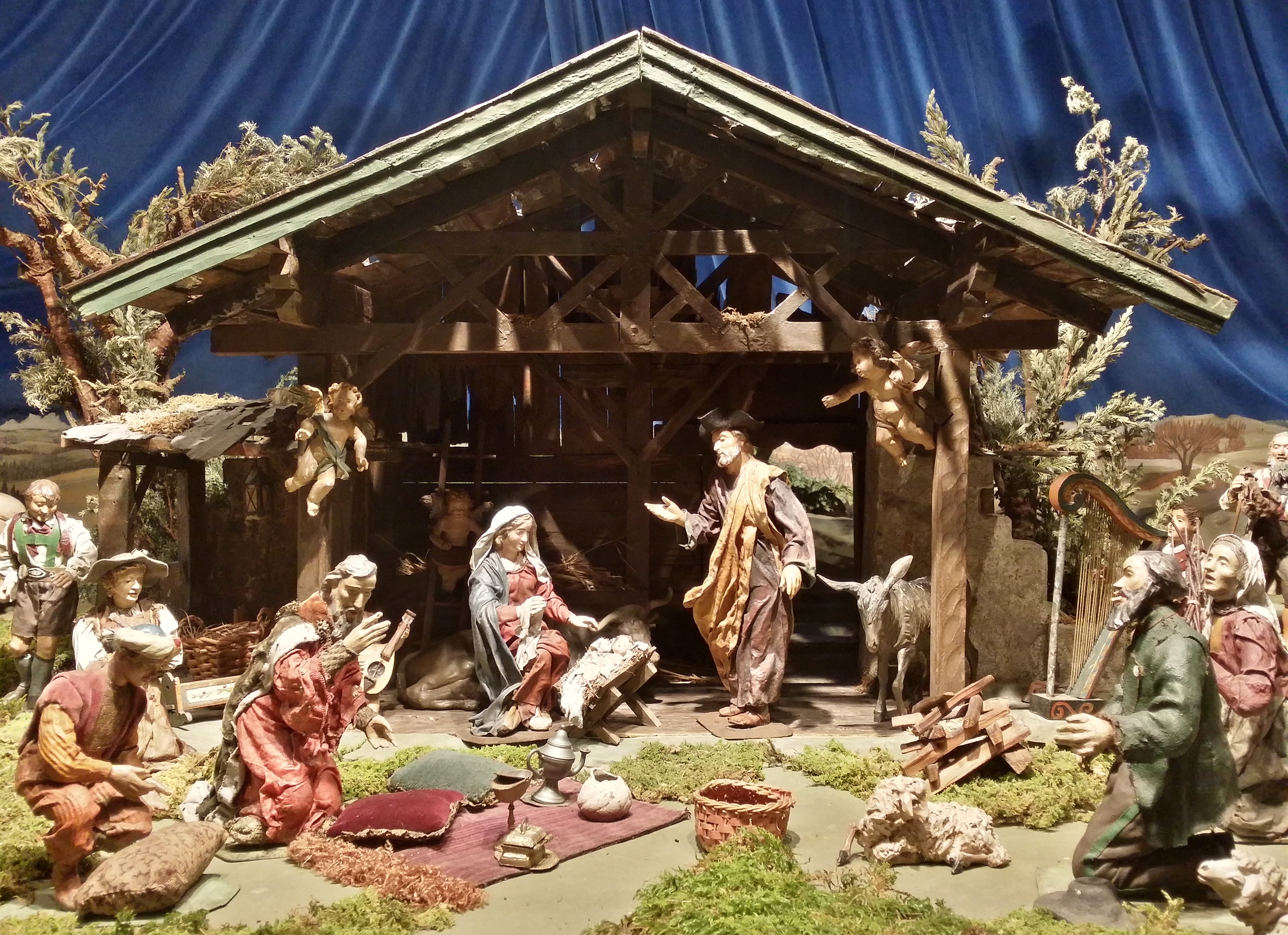
Munich city nativity

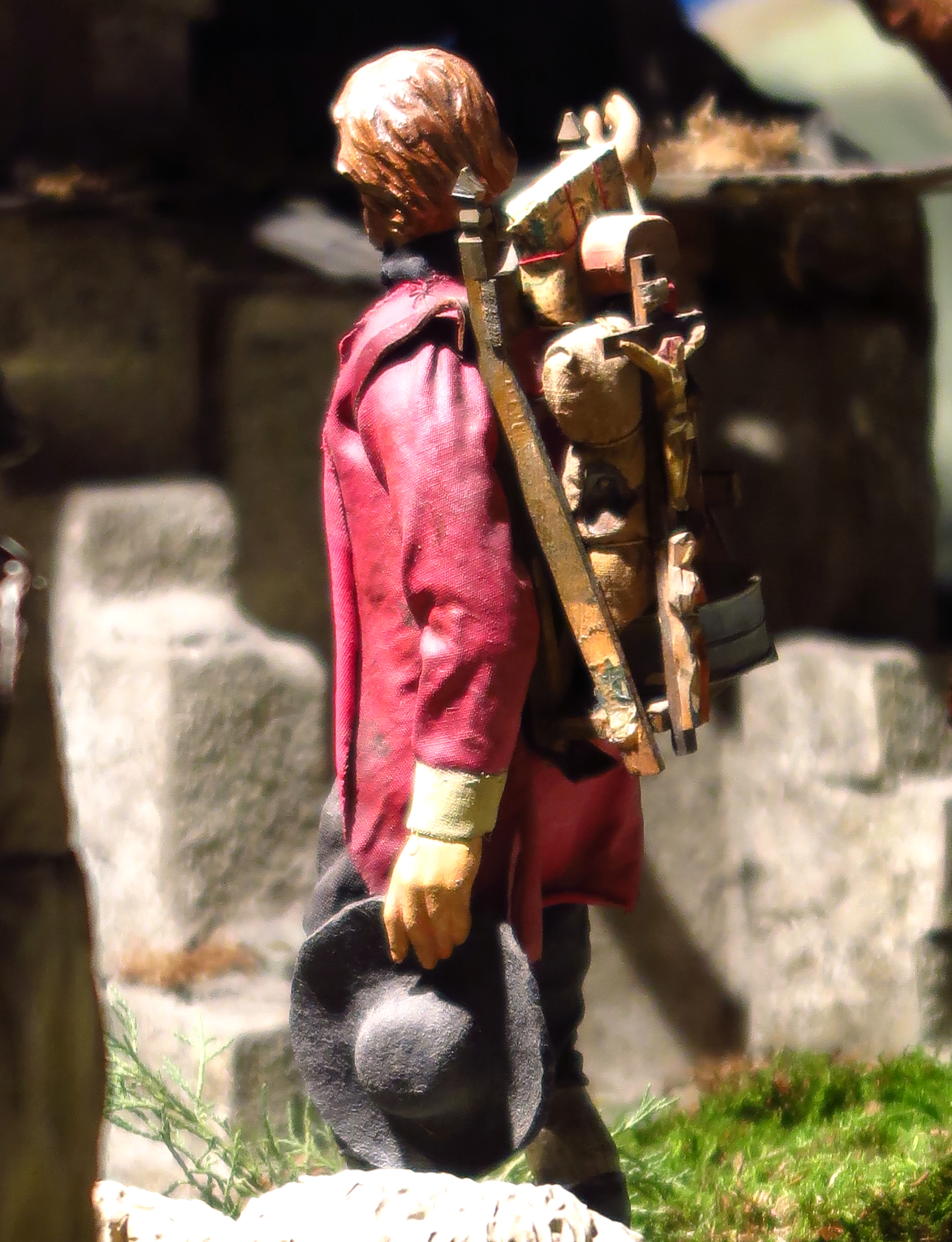
Carrier with crucifix

During the Advent season and until the end of the Christmas season, the old Bavarian Christmas Nativity, from the wood sculptor Reinhold Zellner, born in 1903, can be visited in the Prunkhof of the town hall (inner courtyard) in direct proximity to the Christkindlmarkt. The Christmas nativity was designed by the artist for the Christkindlmarkt in 1954 and consists of 33 figures, which are dressed in oriental and Alpine style, and 28 animals. As a special feature, the crucifix carrier is included, which leads anachronistically to the birth of Jesus with a crucifix. Over the decades, some figures disappeared, and weather and aging-related damages affected the entire ensemble. In the year 2000, a comprehensive restoration of the art work took place for 30,000 DM, in the course of which the lost nativity figures were replaced. With the completion of the renewal work, the nativity became the property of the Munich Tourist Board.

== Ratskeller ==
Ratskeller New Town Hall Munich

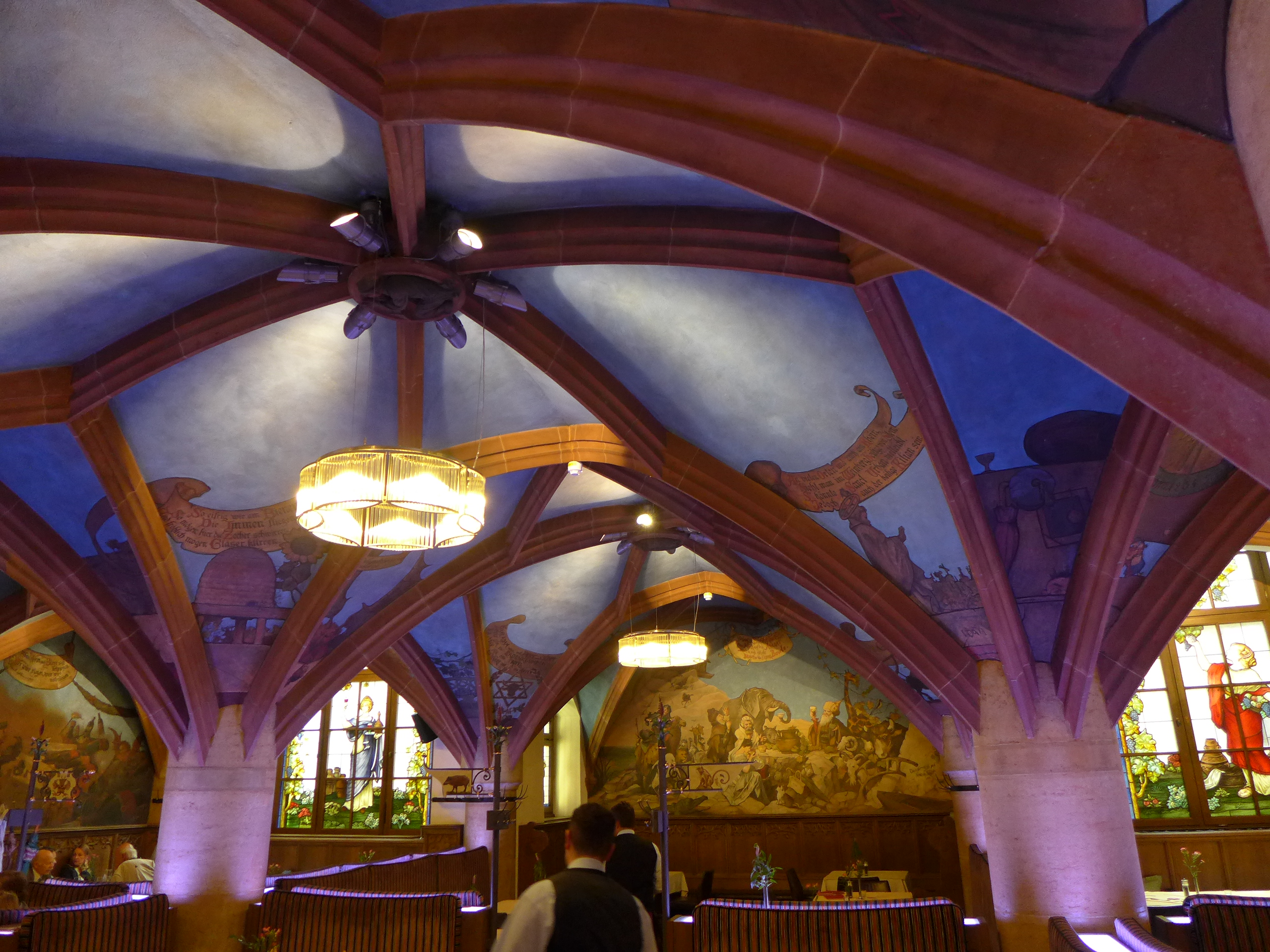
Ratskeller New Town Hall Munich, vault painting, originally designed by Heinrich Schlitt for the Ratskeller of the town hall of St. Johann

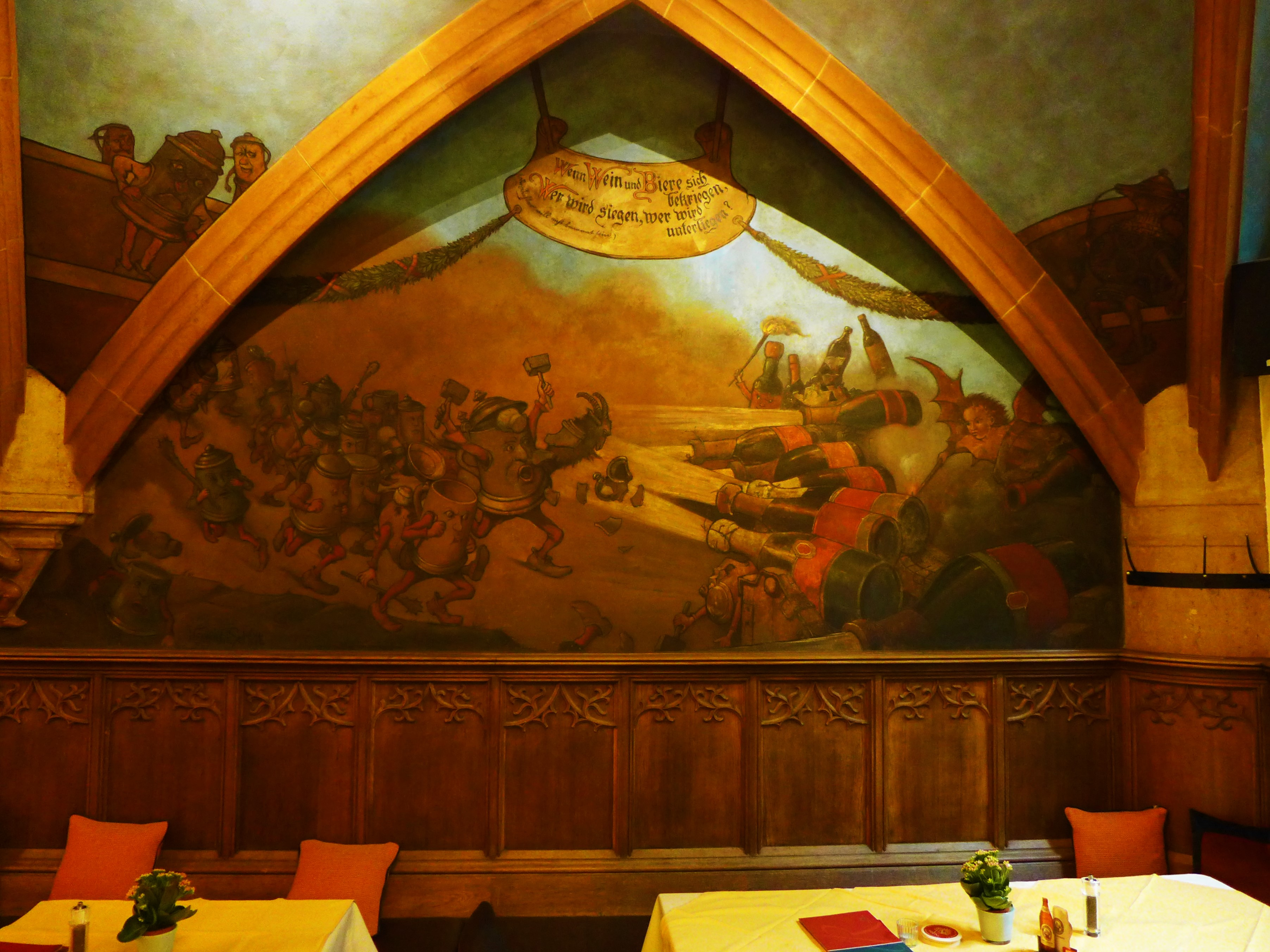
Wall painting in the Ratskeller "When wine and beers are fighting ..." by Heinrich Schlitt

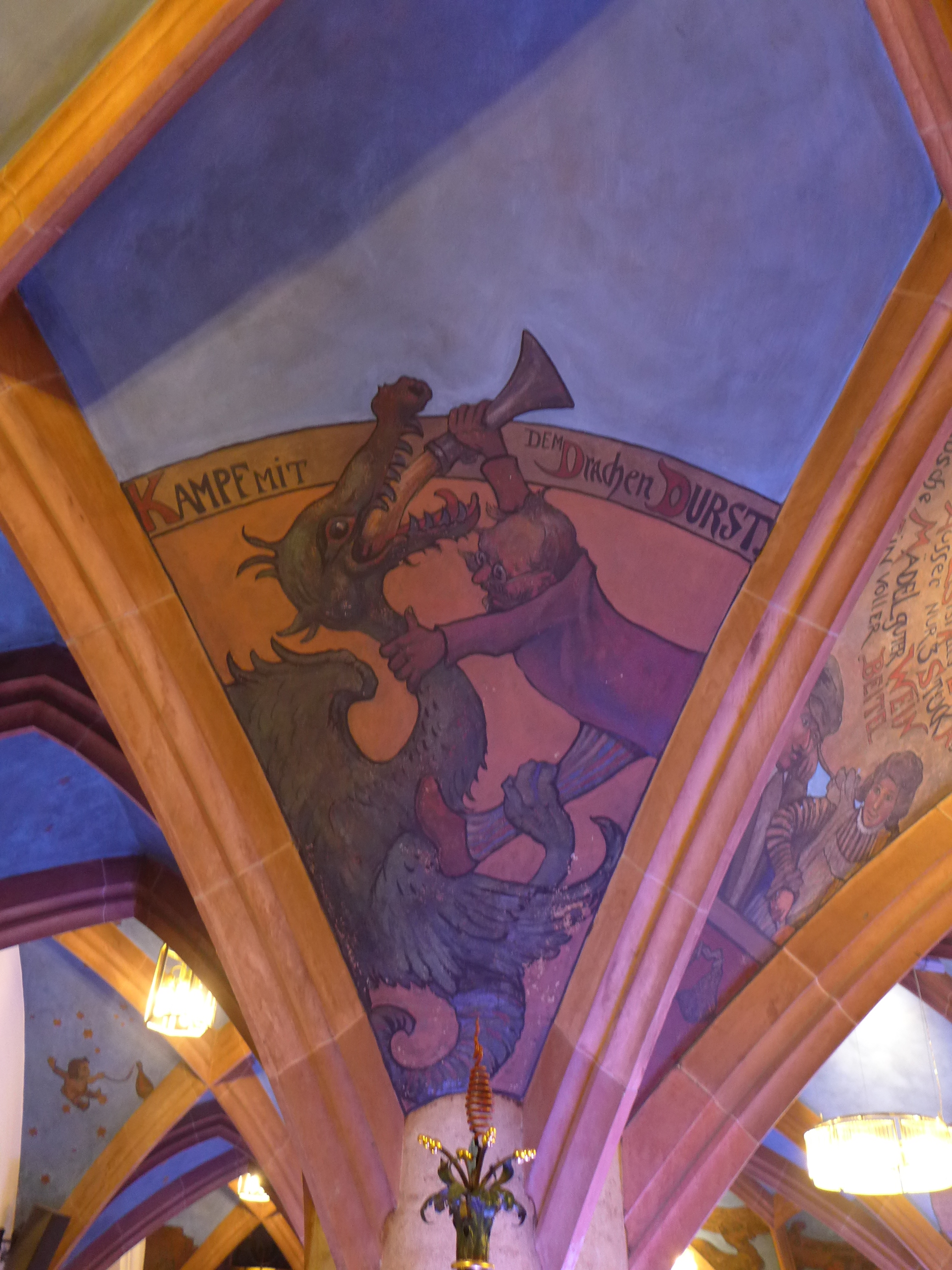
Ratskeller New Town Hall Munich, detail of the vault painting by Heinrich Schlitt

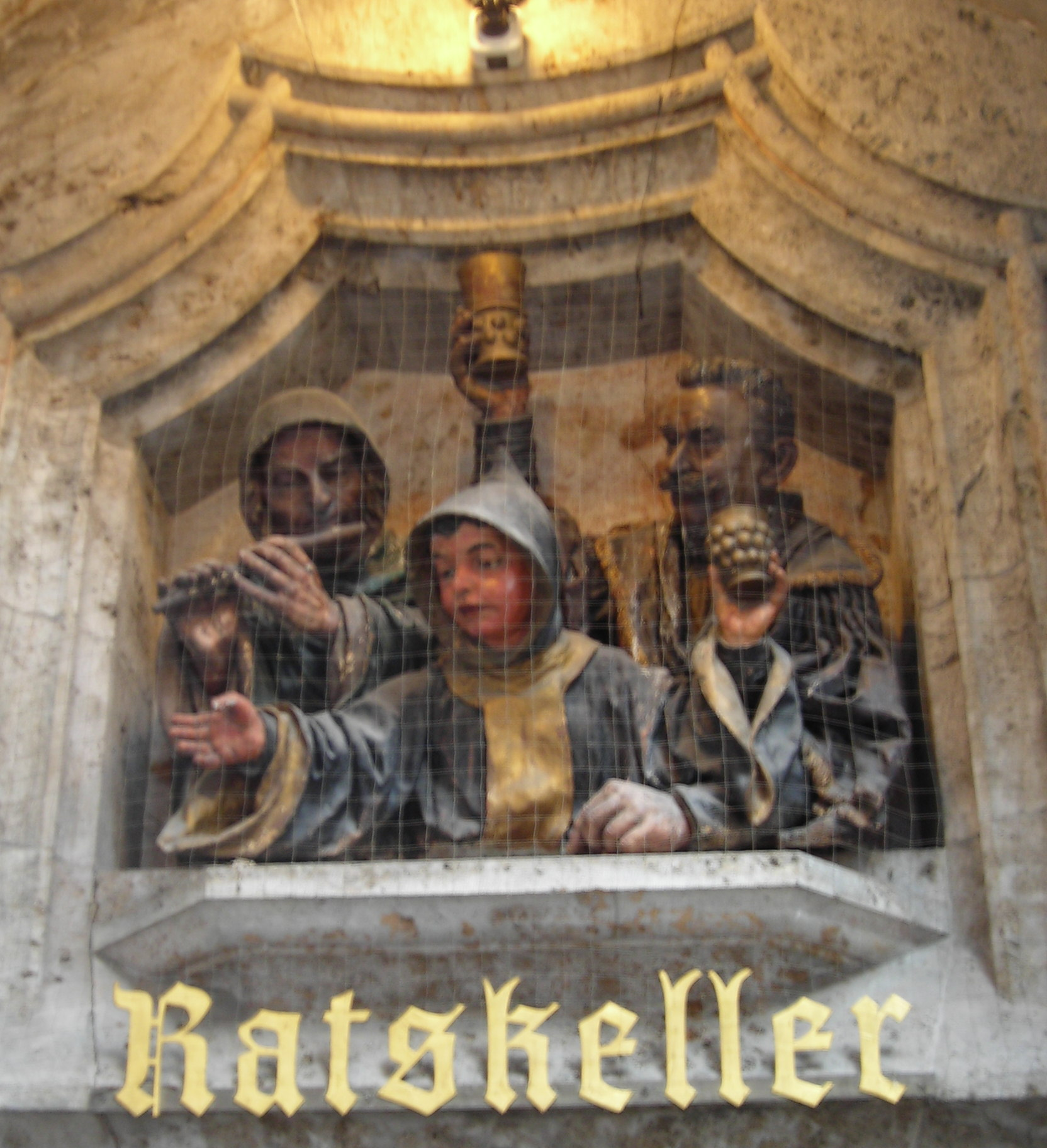
Entrance to the Ratskeller in the courtyard

The Ratskeller was painted by the Biebrich painter Heinrich Schlitt, and officially opened as a restaurant in the six cross-vaults in the basement of the new town hall on 1 August 1874 by the first Ratskeller-Wirte couple Ernst and Franziska Steidl. The present painting of the Munich Ratskeller was originally designed for Hauberrissers Ratskeller in the town hall of St. Johann. Hauberrisser had proposed Schlitt do the painting in the St. Johanner Ratskeller. The theme of the planned painting was "The Battle of Beer Against Wine". Heinrich Schlitt had already been an artist known in the Saar region, and among other things, he designed ceramics for Villeroy & Boch at the beginning of the 20th century. Schlitt also coined the "Bierkeller" with humorous frescoes in co-operation with colleagues starting in the year 1890, in the Ratskeller of the New Town Hall in Wiesbaden, which was also designed by Georg von Hauberrisser.

After disputes between the municipal administration of St. Johann and Schlitt about the payment amount for the painting, Schlitt demanded the return of his sketches for St. Johann and used them to paint the Munich Ratskeller starting in the year 1905.

== Memorial room ==
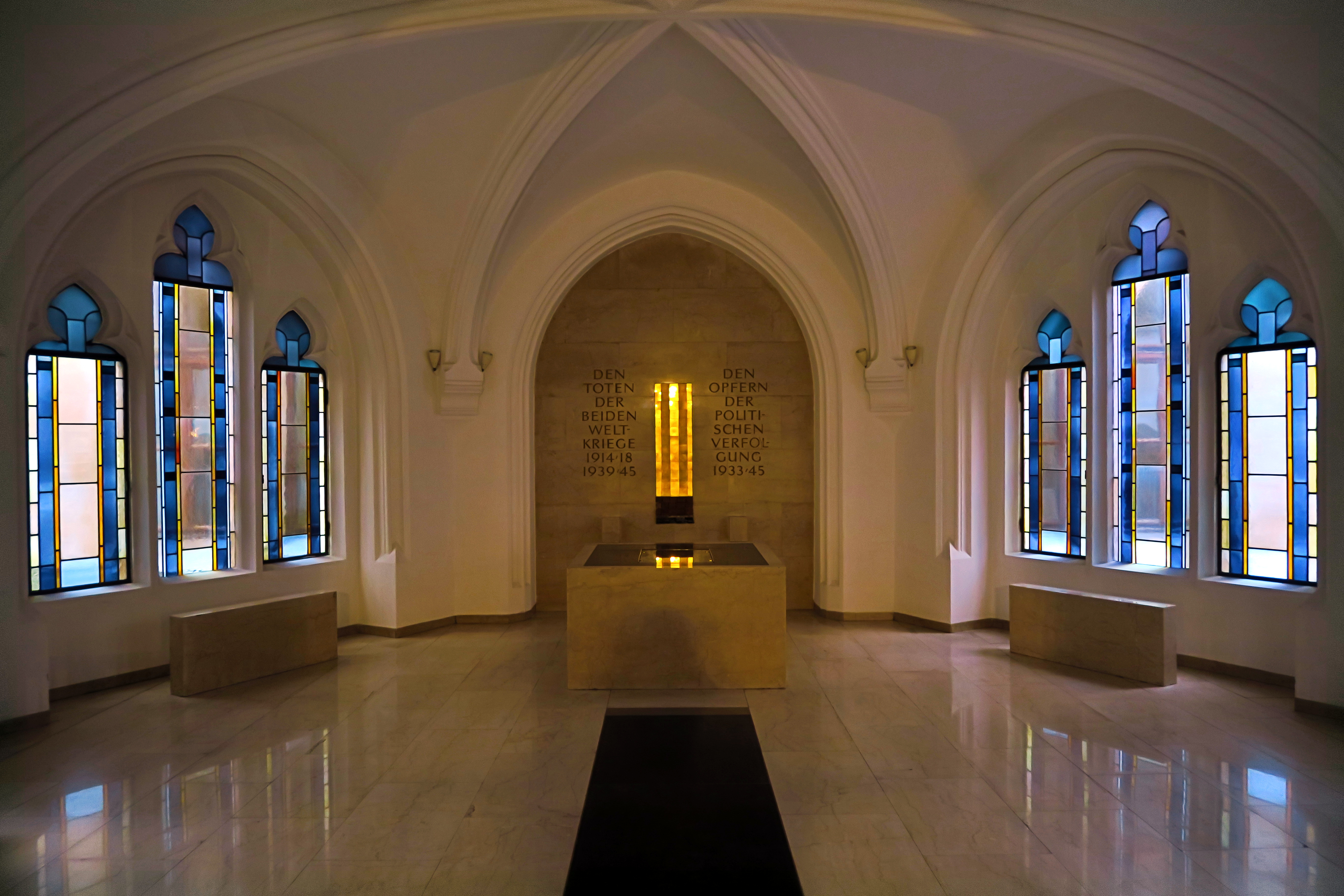
Memorial room

In 1958 a memorial room was set up on the first floor on the Marienplatz side in the same place where after the First World War a memorial room had existed but had been destroyed in the Second World War. In the redesigned room there are two stone panels beside a mosaic created by Karl Knappe, which reminisce those that died in the two world wars and those politically persecuted in the time of Nazism. A floor slab commemorates the city employees who died in service.
