= Kaufingertor =

Tower

Coordinates: 48°08′14″N 11°34′23″E

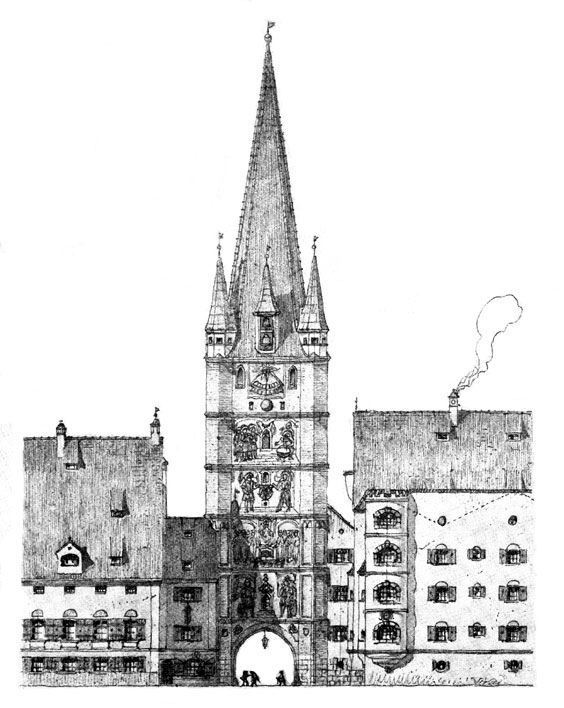
The Kaufingertor after the Sandtnerschen city model

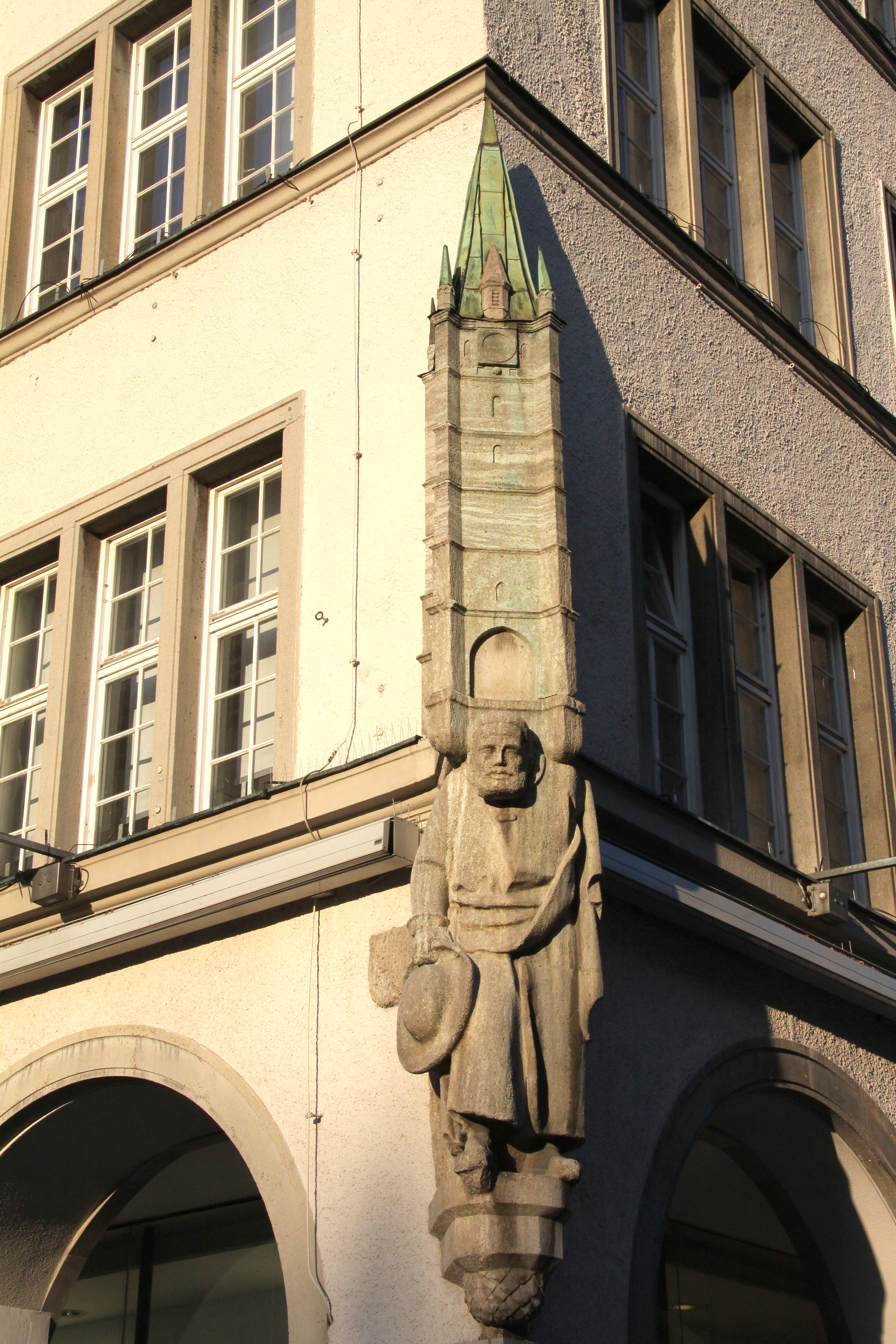
The Kaufingertor as a stone relief

The Kaufingertor was one of the five city gates built around at the end of the 12th century, as the first city walls of medieval Munich. It was located in the west of the old town, approximately at the point where today's Färbergraben and Augustinerstraße meet on Kaufingerstraße.

== History ==
The gate was first mentioned in 1239 under the name porta superior (Upper Gate) in correspondence to the east lying city porta inferior (Lower Gate) or Talburgtor (= today's tower of the Old Town Hall). Through these two gates, the salt road led through Munich to the west.

The gate was a simple tower with gate passage. After the construction of the outer city wall, the gate tower of the merchant family Kaufinger served as a residential tower and was named after them. The gate was demolished in 1479 and rebuilt until 1484 in late Gothic style. In 1510, the gate received a clock and a rich exterior frescoed fresco. Because of this, the gate was mostly referred to as Schöner Turm (Beautiful Tower) from then on. In 1807 it was demolished.

Reminders At the corner Kaufingerstraße / Augustinerstraße (Kaufingerstraße 28: Hirmer-Haus) there is a sculpture of the gate tower and next to it a commemorative plaque with another depiction of the tower. The inscription of the commemorative plaque states: "Schöner Turm. Built in 1157 in front of today's Hirmer-Haus as gate tower of the oldest city wall in Munich. Rebuilt in 1479 and decorated with frescoes that gave it the name Schöner Turm. Demolished in 1807. The marking on the ground shows its former location." There is no evidence of its 1157 construction year. Munich itself was first mentioned in documents in 1158, and probably later surrounded by a city wall. The reference to the "marking on the ground" refers to the former floor plan of the gate tower which is marked in the pavement of the pedestrian zone.
