= Talburgtor =

Former city gate of Munich, Germany

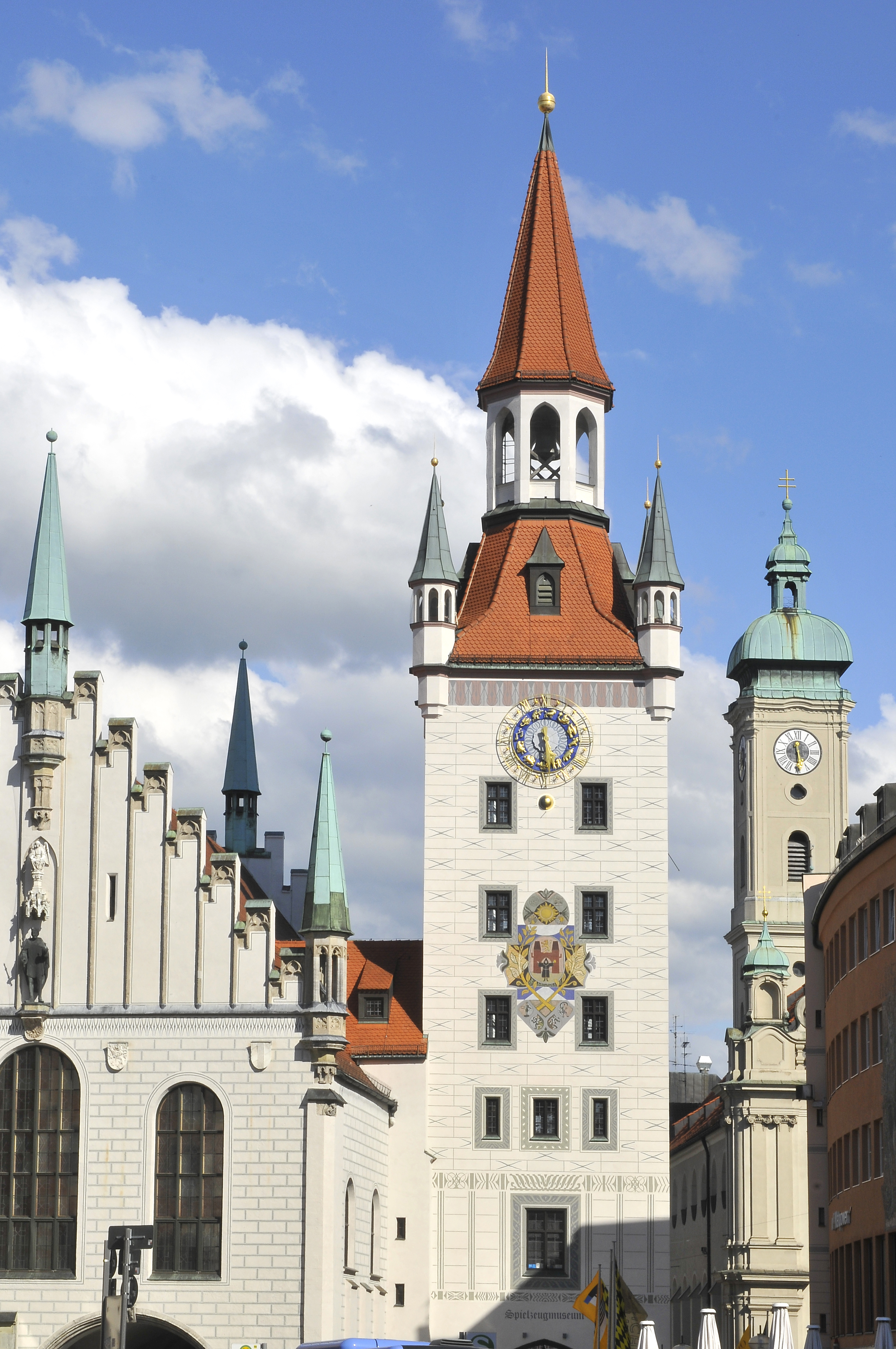
Talburgtor with Old Town Hall, 2015

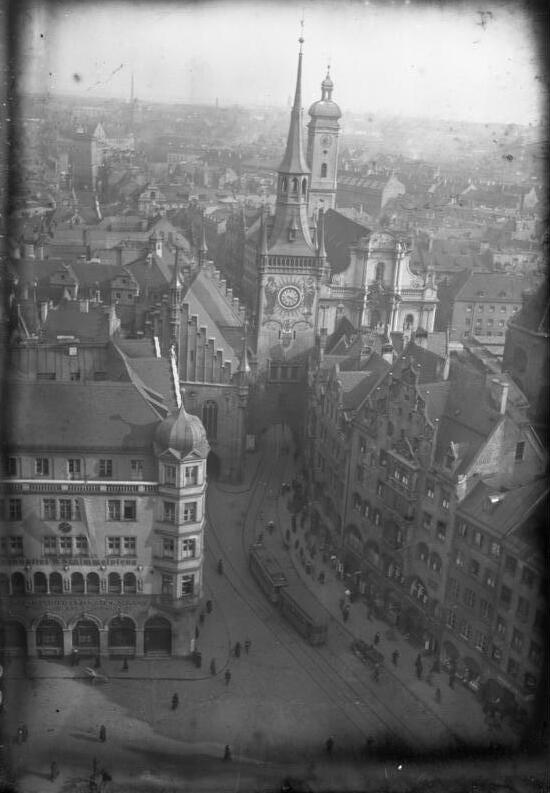
View from the New Town Hall to the Talburgtor, 1923

The Talburgtor, also called Talbrucktor, is one of the five city gates built in the late 12th century, as first city walls of medieval Munich. The Talburgtor is also called Unteres Tor (Lower Gate), Taltor or Rathausturm (Town Hall Tower). It is located in the east of the old town on the south side of the Old Town Hall.

== History ==
The gate was first mentioned in 1301 under the name porta inferior (Lower Gate) in correspondence to it lying west of the city Oberes Tor (Upper Gate) or Kaufingertor. Through these two gates, the salt road led through Munich to the west. Since the Kaufingertor was already referred to as Oberes Tor in 1239, it can be assumed that its counterpart, the Unteres Tor, existed at that time as well.

The Talburgtor was a simple tower with gate passage. From 1392–94, the gate was redesigned as a city hall tower, and in 1460 it was destroyed along with the Old Town Hall, by a lightning strike. From 1470 to 1480, Jörg von Halspach built the Old Town Hall with town hall tower in late Gothic style again parallel to the construction of the Frauenkirche. In this version, the tower is also depicted on the oldest Munich cityscape in the Nuremberg Chronicle of 1493.

In the 16th century, the façade was frescoed and the tower received an onion dome. Therefore, the tower depicted the city model of Munich as shown in 1570 by Jakob Sandtner. In the 19th century the tower received a neo gothic pointed helmet.

The tower was heavily damaged in the 1944 bombing of Munich and was later demolished. In 1972 it was rebuilt in late Gothic style, as it was built by Halspach.

== Miscellaneous ==
The Town Hall Tower today houses the Toy Museum.

Away from the town hall tower, on the outside wall of the Old Town Hall, stands a statue of Juliet of Verona, a present from the Munich twin city Verona.
