= Old Town Hall, Munich =

City hall in Munich, Germany

Coordinates: 48°8′12″N 11°34′37″E

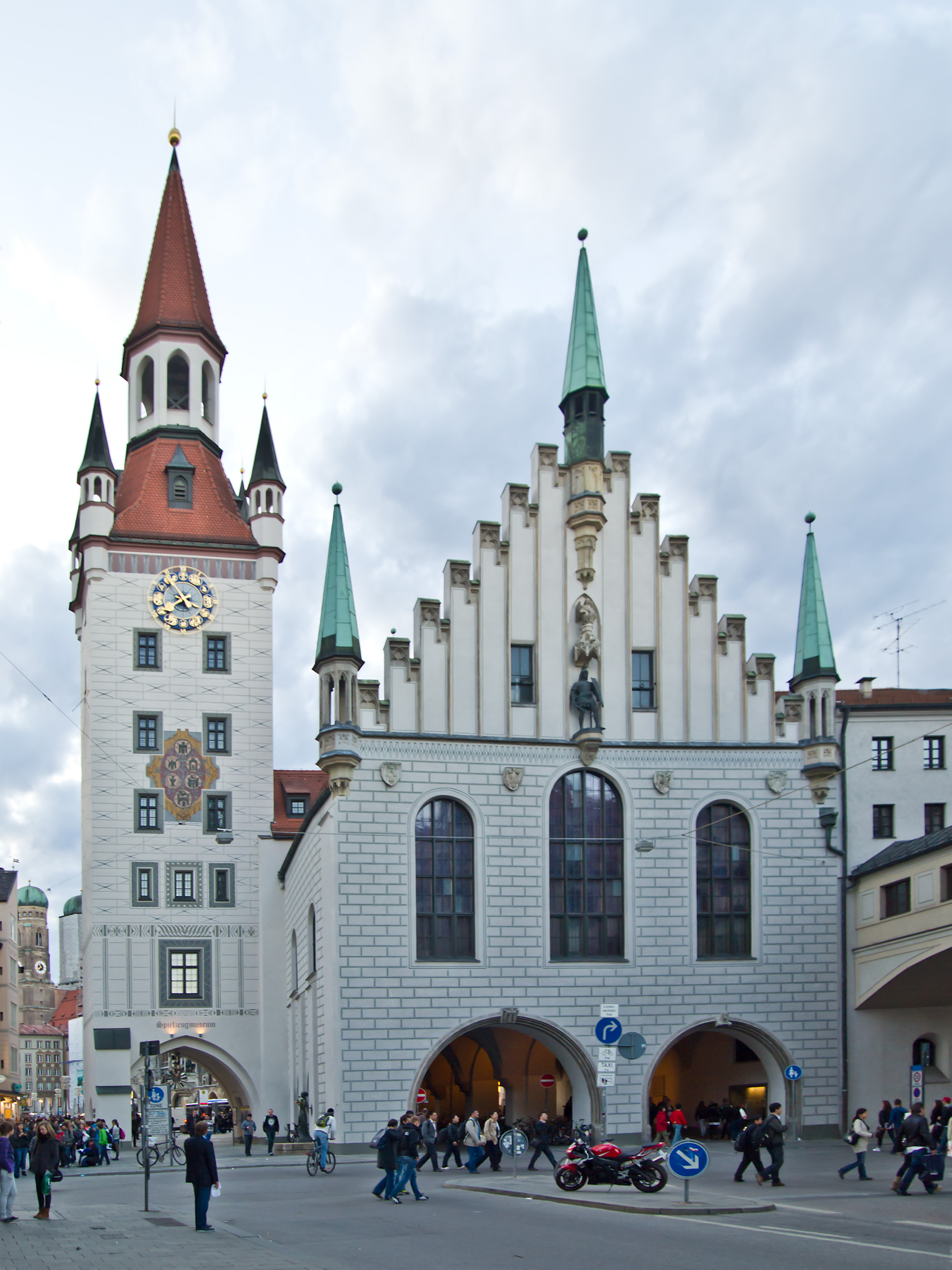
Old Town Hall, eastside, view from Tal

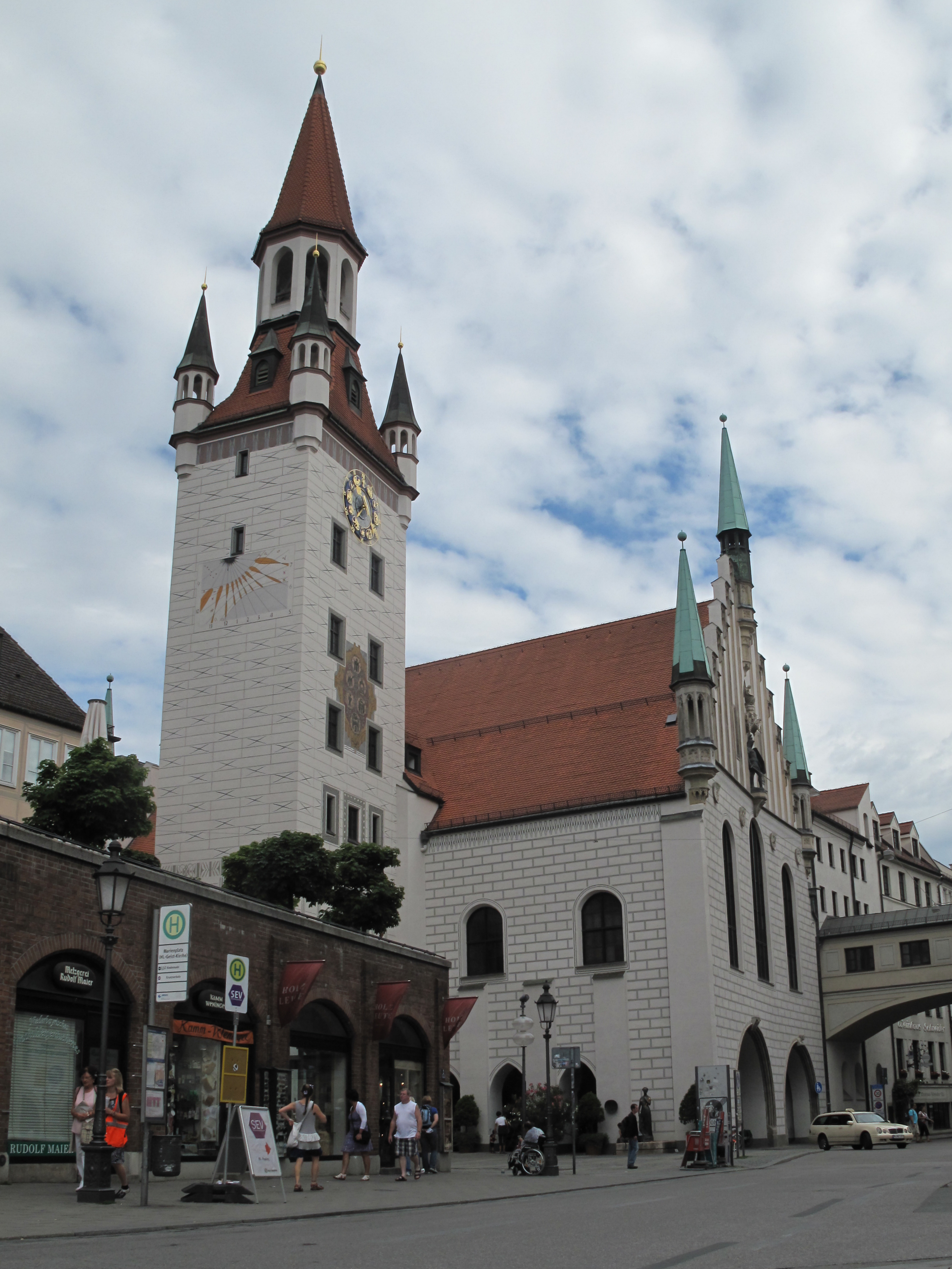
Old Town Hall, view from Viktualienmarkt

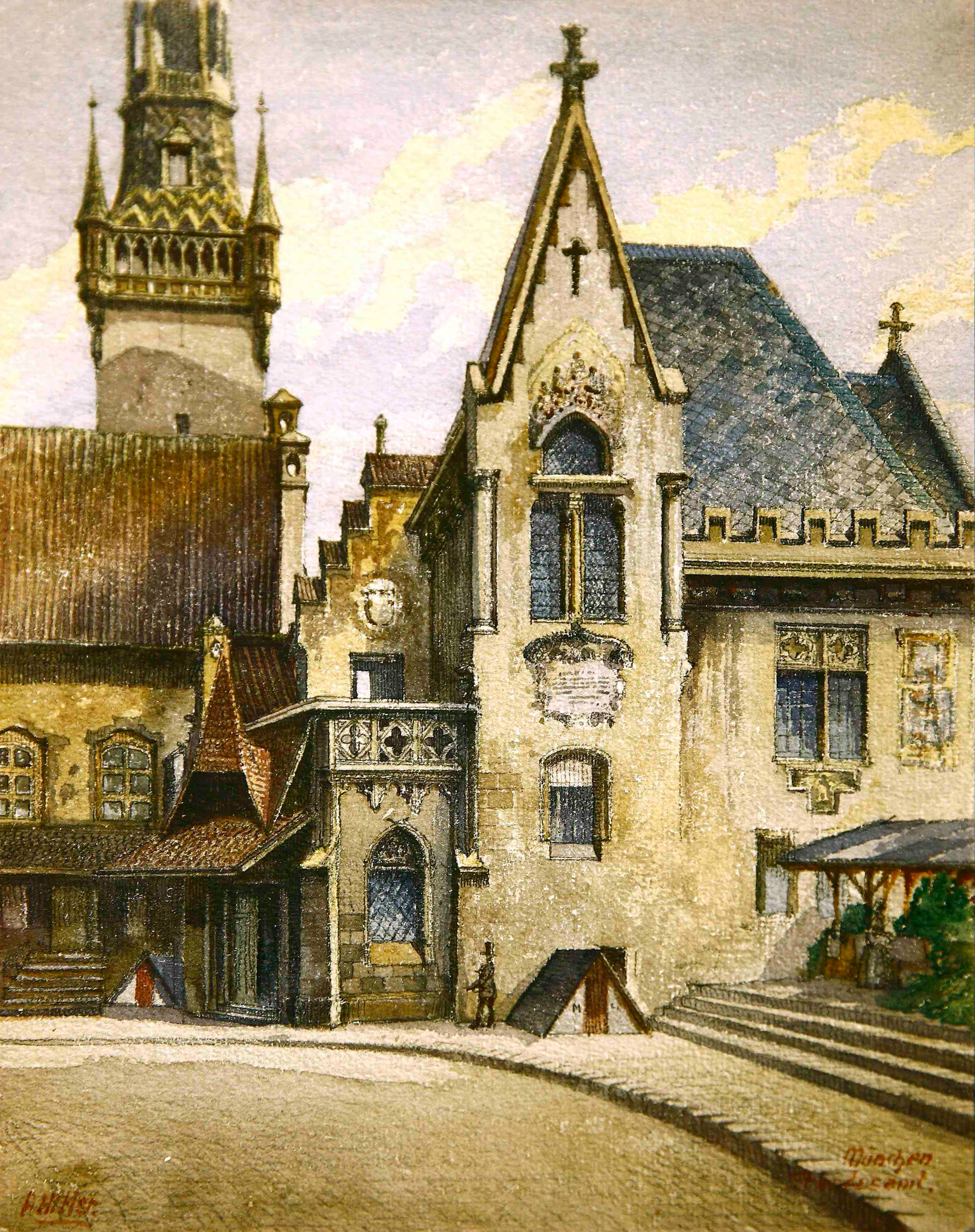
Painting of the Town Hall by Adolf Hitler, 1900s-1910s

The Old Town Hall (German Altes Rathaus), until 1874 the domicile of the municipality, serves today as a building for representative purposes for the city council in Munich, Bavaria, Germany. The Old Town Hall bounds the central square Marienplatz on its east side.

== Architecture ==
The building, documented for the first time in 1310, had its Grand Hall (Großer Saal) constructed in 1392/1394. The former Talburg Gate (Talburgtor) of the first city wall serves as spire. The Old Town Hall was re-designed in late-gothic style by Jörg von Halsbach 1470–1480. The Grand Hall was decorated by the Morris dancers, created by Erasmus Grasser. After alterations of the facade during the Renaissance and again in the Baroque the building was restored in neo-Gothic style 1861–1864. In 1874 the municipality moved to the New Town Hall.

For the passage of increased road traffic the Old Town Hall was tunneled in 1877 with a drive-through and a separate pedestrian's passage, as well as once again in 1934/35, this time finally destroying the original ground floor. During World War II the building was severely damaged and the spire was reconstructed in 1971–1974. Parts of the neo-Gothic elements, especially the statues of Ludwig the Bavarian (west facade) and Henry the Lion (east facade) and the gable design are preserved.

The Grand Hall was the venue for the speech of Joseph Goebbels on November 9, 1938 which is known as the prelude for the Kristallnacht.
