= Kracker (surname) =

Kracker is a surname. It stems from German (nick)names Kräger or Kräcker, and may originate from kraken (to whine, to complain). The surname may refer to

- Johann Lucas Kracker (1717–1779), Austrian-Czech painter
- Tobias Kracker (1655–1736), Austrian sculptor and painter
- Uncle Kracker (born 1974), American singer-songwriter and musician
