= Holy Trinity Column, Olomouc =

Monument

Holy Trinity Column
- Sloup Nejsvětější Trojice
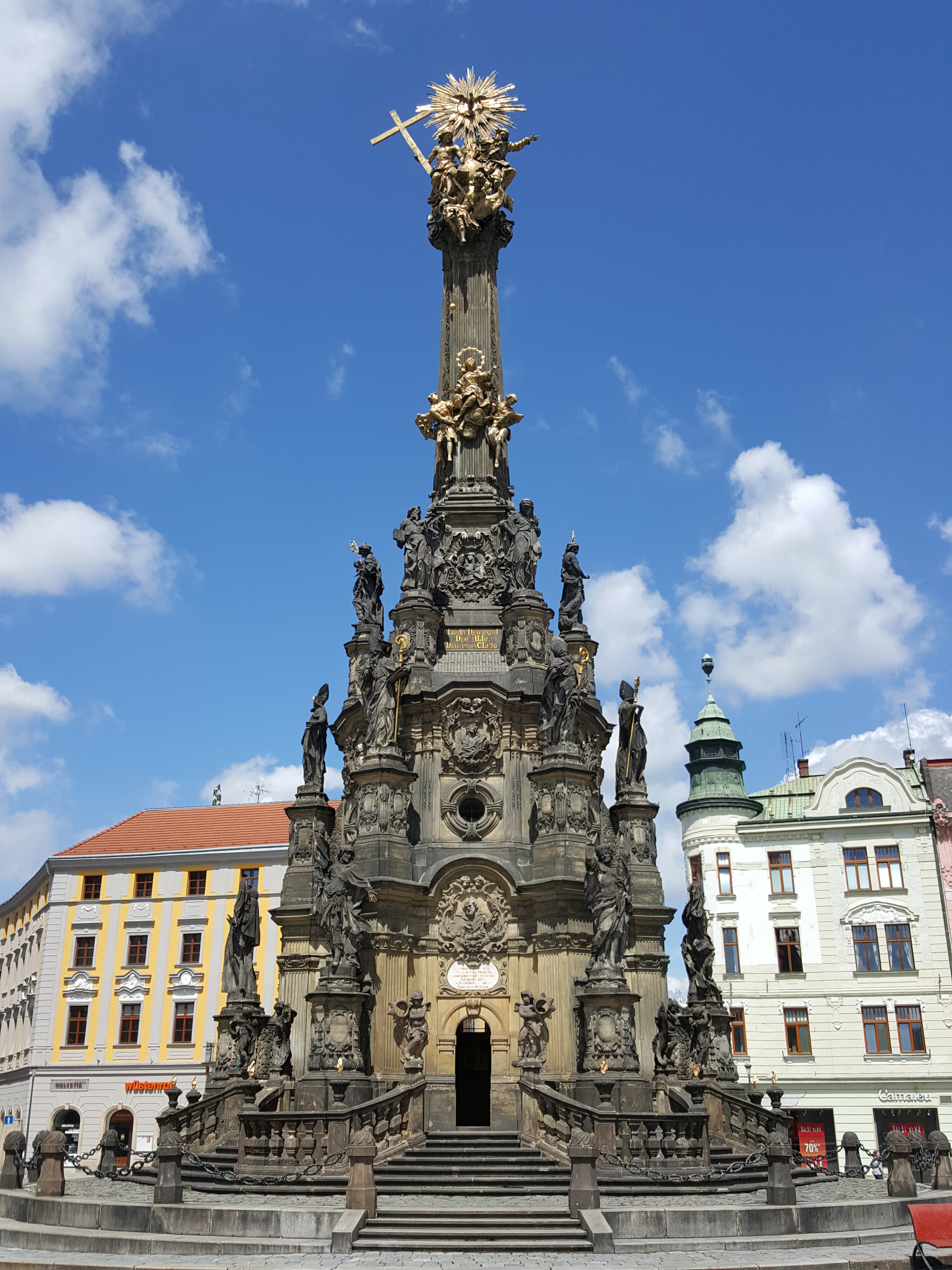
- "To the glory of God the Almighty, the Virgin Mary and the saints I will build a column that in its height and splendour will be unrivalled in any other town." From Wenzel Render's letter to the Olomouc City Council.
- Interactive map of Holy Trinity Column
- Location: Olomouc, Czech Republic
- Coordinates: 49°35′38.19″N 17°15′1.53″E
- Beginning date: 1716
- Completion date: 1754

UNESCO World Heritage Site
- Official name: Holy Trinity Column in Olomouc
- Type: Cultural
- Criteria: i, iv
- Designated: 2000 (24th session)
- Reference no.: 859rev
- Region: Europe and North America

The Holy Trinity Column (Czech: Sloup Nejsvětější Trojice) in Olomouc, in the Czech Republic is a Baroque monument (Trinity column) that was built between 1716 and 1754. The main purpose was to celebrate the Catholic Church and faith, partly caused by feeling of gratitude for ending a plague, which struck Moravia (now in the Czech Republic) between 1713 and 1715. The column was also understood to be an expression of local patriotism, since all artists and master craftsmen working on this monument were Olomouc citizens, and almost all depicted saints were connected with the city of Olomouc in some way.

It is the biggest Baroque sculptural group in the Czech Republic. In 2000, it was inscribed on the UNESCO World Heritage List as its smallest independent standalone property at just 200 square metres (2,200 sq ft), and recognized as "one of the most exceptional examples of the apogee of central European Baroque artistic expression".

== History ==
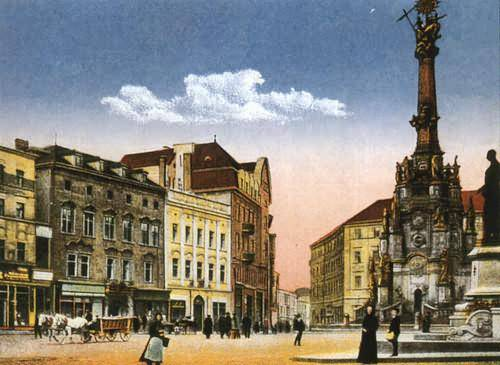
Historical picture of the Holy Trinity Column on Olomouc Upper Square

According to the ICOMOS evaluation of this patrimony, "the erection of Marian (plague) columns on town squares is an exclusively Baroque, post-Tridentine, phenomenon. Its iconographic basis lies in the Book of Revelation. The basic model is thought to have been the column in the Piazza Santa Maria Maggiore in Rome, from 1614.

This monument for Olomouc was the culmination of work of several artists and master craftsmen, but it did not bring much fortune to them. The first to die during the work was Wenzel Render, a monumental mason and privileged imperial architect. He came first with the idea to build the column, enforced his will upon the city council, designed it, built the first stage and helped to finance it. His followers Franz Thoneck, Johann Wenzel Rokický and Augustin Scholtz also did not live long enough to see the column finished; it was completed by Johann Ignaz Rokický. The sculptural decoration was started by Phillip Sattler. After his death Andreas Zahner continued and made 18 sculptures and 9 reliefs in 7 years before he died as well. Goldsmith Simon Forstner, who made gilded copper sculptures of the Holy Trinity and of the Assumption of the Virgin, was somewhat luckier and managed to finish his brilliant work. However he lost his health when working on the sculptures and using toxic mercury compounds during the gilding process.

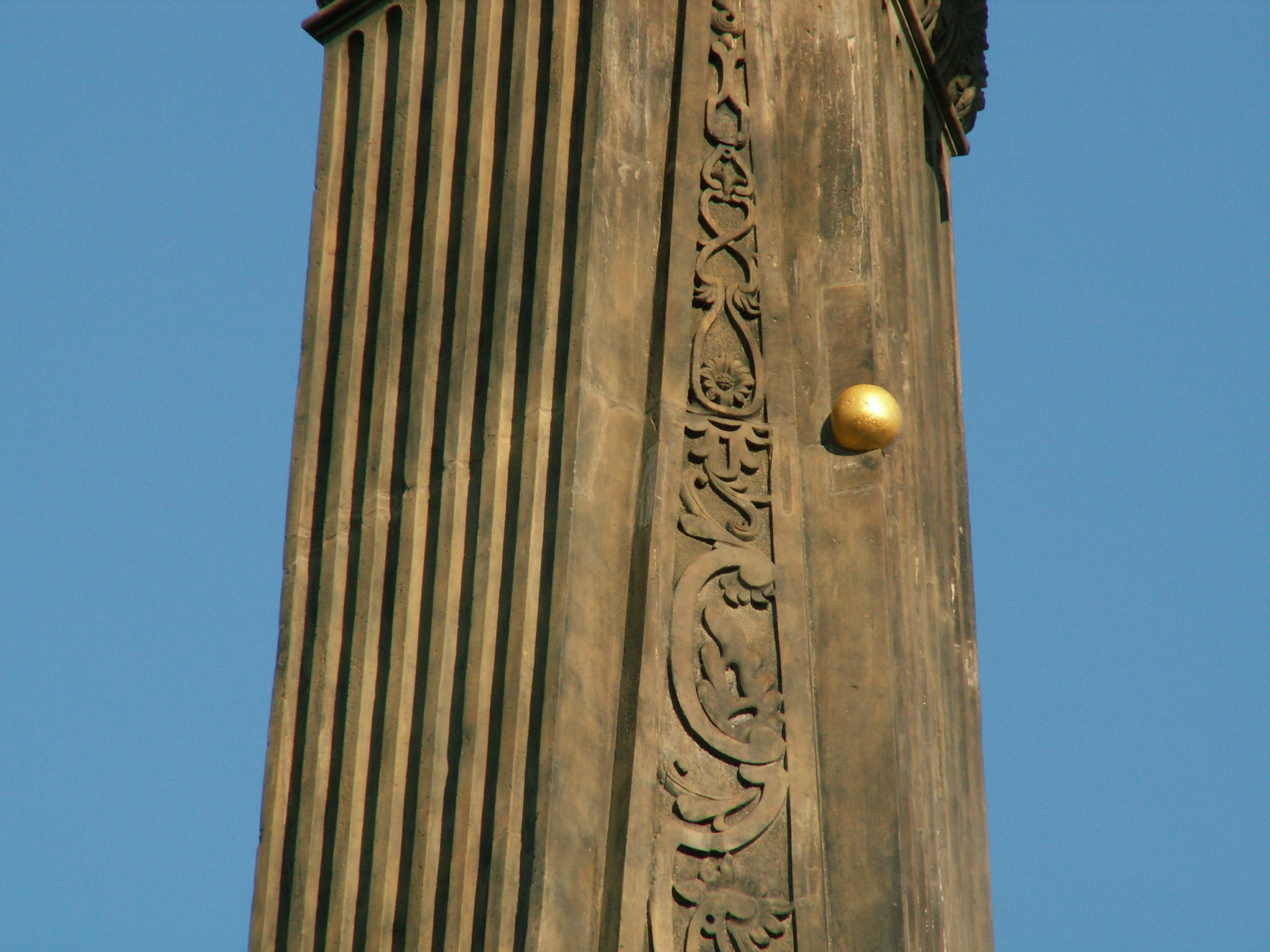
Gilded replica of a stone shot reminds that the column was hit from Prussian cannons several times during the siege of Olomouc in 1758.

After the Holy Trinity Column was finished in 1754, it became a source of great pride for Olomouc, since all people participating in its creation were citizens of the town. The column was consecrated in a great celebration attended by Empress Maria Theresa and her husband Francis I.

Only four years later, when Olomouc was besieged by a Prussian army and the Holy Trinity Column was hit by shots from Prussian cannons several times, Olomouc citizens went in a procession to beg the Prussian general not to shoot at the monument. General James Keith complied with their wishes. The column was repaired soon after the war and a replica of a stone shot was half-buried in its stem on the place where it was hit to remind people of this event.

== Description ==
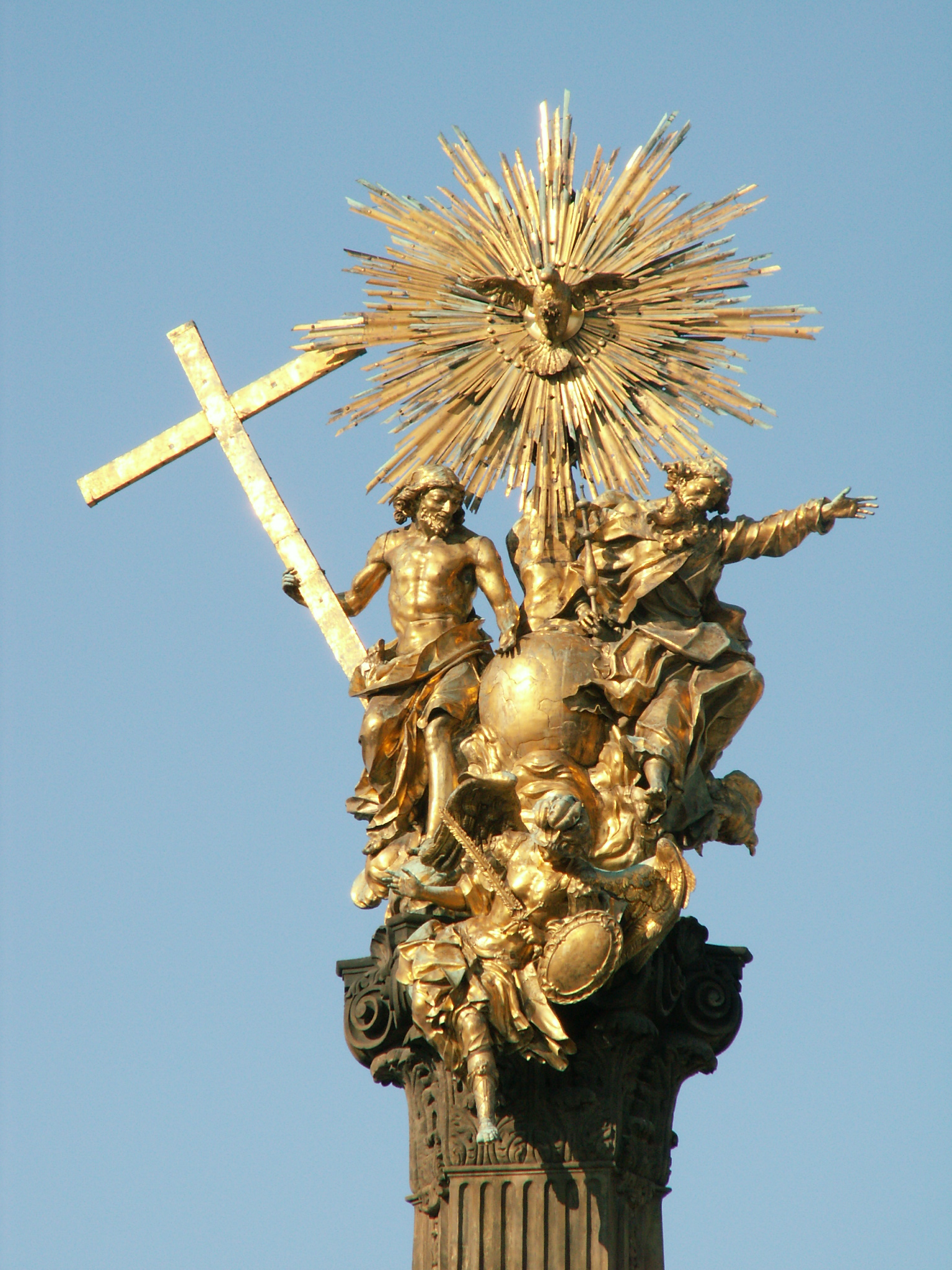
Gilded statue of the Holy Trinity atop the column

The column is dominated by gilded copper sculptures of the Holy Trinity accompanied by the Archangel Gabriel on the top and the Assumption of the Virgin beneath it.

The base of the column, in three levels, is surrounded by 18 more stone sculptures of saints and 14 reliefs in elaborate cartouches. At the uppermost stage are saints connected with Jesus’ earth life – his mother's parents Saint Anne and Saint Joachim, his legal father Saint Joseph, and Saint John the Baptist, who was preparing his coming – who are accompanied by Saint Lawrence and Saint Jerome, saints to whom the chapel in the Olomouc town hall was dedicated. Three reliefs represent the Three theological virtues Faith, Hope, and Love.

Below them, the second stage is dedicated to Moravian saints St. Cyril and St. Methodius (Czech Metoděj), who came to Great Moravia to spread Christianity in 863 (Saint Methodius became Moravian Archbishop), Saint Blaise, in whose name one of the main Olomouc churches is consecrated, and patrons of neighbouring Bohemia Saint Adalbert of Prague (Czech Vojtěch) and Saint John of Nepomuk (Czech Jan Nepomucký), whose following was very strong there as well.

In the lowest stage one can see the figures of an Austrian patron Saint Maurice and a Bohemian patron Saint Wenceslas (Czech Václav), in whose names two important Olomouc churches were consecrated, another Austrian patron Saint Florian, who was also viewed as a protector against various disasters, especially fire, Saint John of Capistrano (Czech Jan Kapistránský), who used to preach in Olomouc, Saint Anthony of Padua, a member of the Franciscan Order, which owned an important monastery in Olomouc, and Saint Aloysius Gonzaga, a patron of students. His sculpture showed that Olomouc was very proud of its university.

Reliefs of all twelve apostles are placed among these sculptures.

== John Sarkander ==
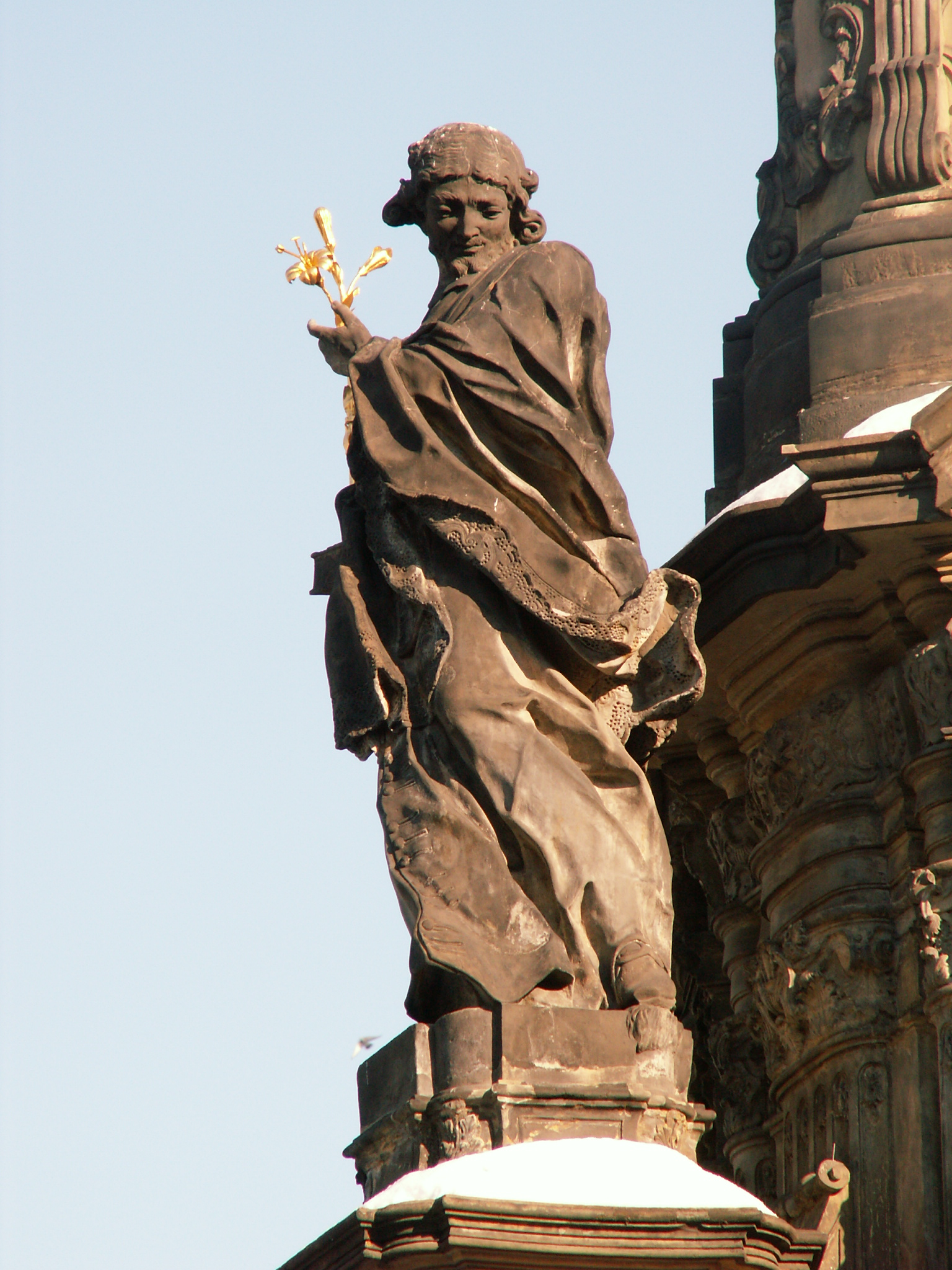
Statue of Saint John Sarkander on the Holy Trinity Column

The last missing in this list of saints is St. John Sarkander (Czech Jan Sarkander), whose statue (holding a lily as a symbol of purity) is on the second stage. John Sarkander was a priest who was tortured to death in Olomouc prison in the beginning of the Thirty Years' War, because he, as the legend says, refused to break the seal of confession. The decision to place him here violated the tradition, since Sarkander had not been canonized and not even beatified in that time yet, which could have resulted in problems with the Holy See. However, his following was so strong here that the craftsmen decided to take the risk. Sarkander was beatified in 1859 and canonized in 1995 on the occasion of the visit of Pope John Paul II in Olomouc.

== Inner chapel ==
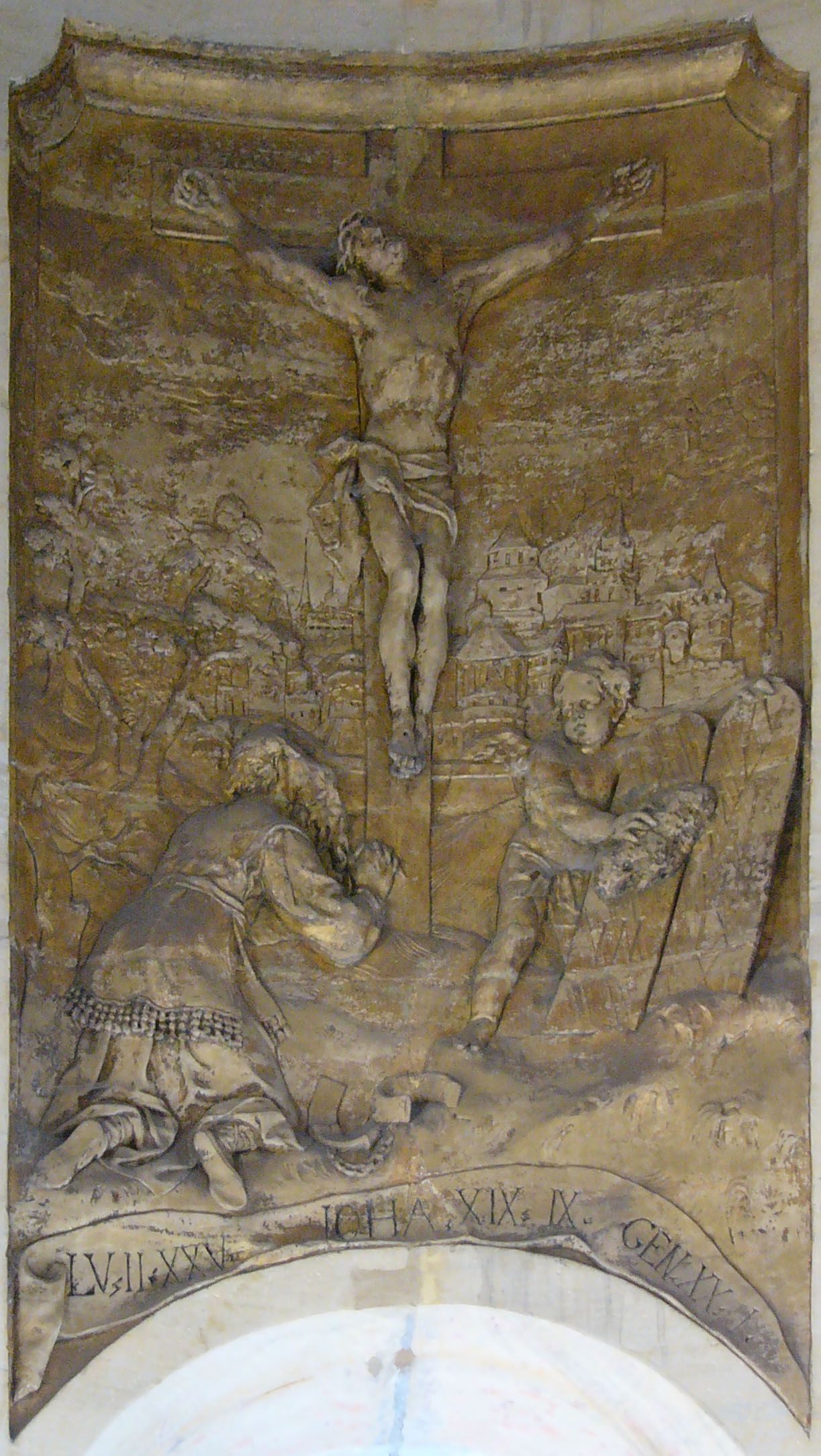
Relief depicting the Crucifixion

The column also houses a small chapel inside with reliefs depicting Cain's offering from his crop, Abel's offering of firstlings of his flock, Noah's first burnt offering after the Flood, Abraham's offering of Isaac and of a lamb, and Jesus' death. The cities of Jerusalem and Olomouc can be seen in the background of the last mentioned relief.

== See also ==
- 1754 in architecture
- Marian and Holy Trinity columns
- Pestsäule, Vienna

== Bibliography ==
Books in Czech:

- Perůtka, Marek (ed.) (2001). Sloup Nejsvětější Trojice v Olomouci. Olomouc: Statutární město Olomouc. (includes English summary)
- Los, Petr & Brabcová, Jitka (2002). Svatí na sloupu Nejsvětější Trojice v Olomouci. Olomouc: Danal. ISBN 80-85973-94-4
- Tichák, Milan (2002). Příběhy olomouckých pomníků. Olomouc: Burian a Tichák, s. r. o.
