= Votive column =

Image with its structure

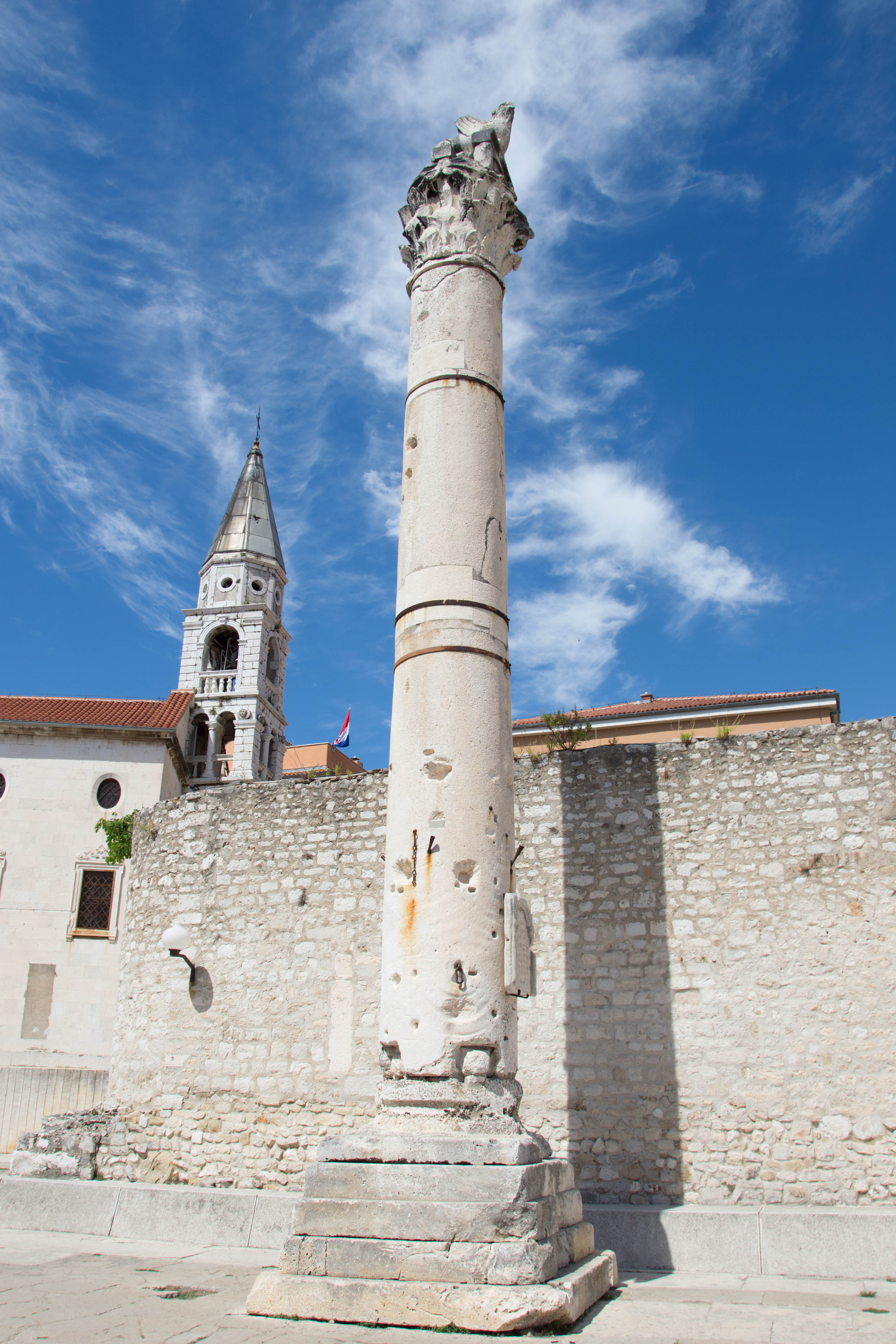
Votive column in the Roman forum remains in Zadar, Croatia

A votive column (also votive pillar) is the combination of a column (pillar) and a votive image.

The presence of columns supporting votive sculptures in Ancient Greek temples is well attested since at least the Archaic period. The oldest known example of a Corinthian column is in the Temple of Apollo Epicurius at Bassae in Arcadia, c. 450–420 BC. It is not part of the order of the temple itself, which has a Doric colonnade surrounding the temple and an Ionic order within the cella enclosure. A single Corinthian column stands free, centered within the cella. It is often interpreted as a votive column.

In Imperial Rome, it was the practice to erect a statue of the Emperor atop a column. The last such a column was the Column of Phocas, erected in the Roman Forum and dedicated or rededicated in 608. The Christian adaptation is the Marian column, attested from at least the 10th century (in Clermont-Ferrand in France). The image of Our Lady of the Pillar in Zaragoza dates to the 15th century. Marian columns became popular especially in the Counter-Reformation, beginning with the column in Piazza Santa Maria Maggiore in Rome. The column itself was ancient, a leftover of the Basilica of Constantine, which had been destroyed by an earthquake in the 9th century. In 1614 it was transported to Piazza Santa Maria Maggiore and crowned with a bronze statue of the Virgin and Child. Within decades it served as a model for many columns in Italy and other European countries, such as the Mariensäule in Munich (1638).

== See also ==
- Cult image
- Stele
- Asherah pole
- Pillar of the Boatmen
- Trajan column
- Victory column
- Zbruch Idol
- Irminsul
- Ceremonial pole
- Totem pole
- Axis mundi
