= Plague Column, Košice =

Monument in Slovakia

Coordinates: 48.7228°N 21.2568°E

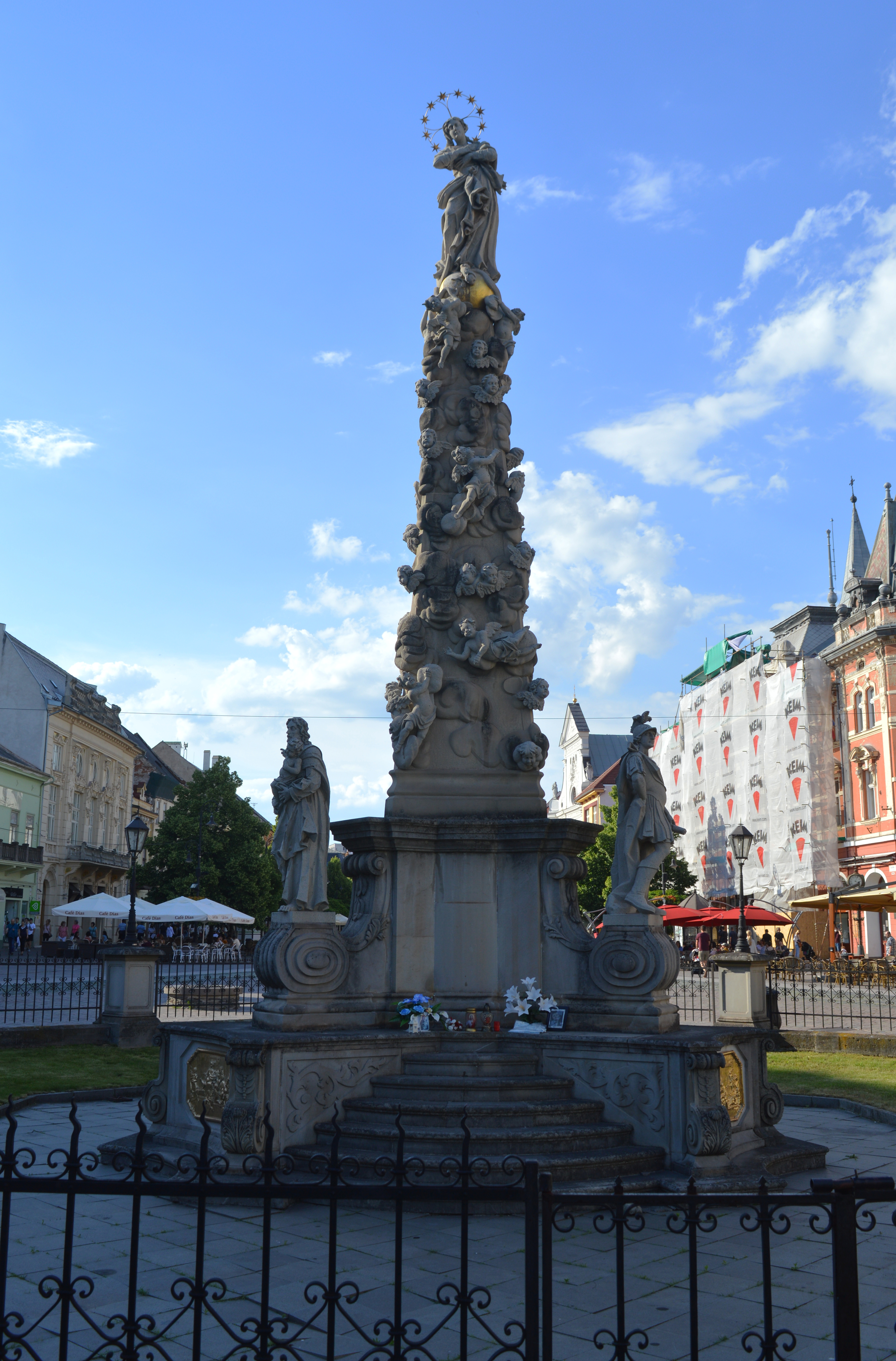
The Plague Column at Main street in Košice, Slovakia

The Plague Column (Slovak: Morový stĺp) or Immaculata is a Baroque plague column (Marian and Holy Trinity column) in Košice, Slovakia.

The column is situated in a small park and commemorates the gratitude to Mary for an end to the plague epidemic from 1709 and 1710. It was erected at the place of medieval gallows at Fő utca (Main Street, now called Hlavná ulica) in 1723. A plaque on the base claims that the relics of Saint Valentine are hidden beneath the structure.

It is a 14-metre-high (46 ft) column on a stone basement with sculptures of Saint Joseph, Saint Sebastian and Saint Ladislaus. There is a sculpture of the Virgin Mary on the top of the column. The sculptures of Saint Gabriel, Saint Elizabeth of Hungary, Saint Margaret, Saint Michael the Archangel and Saint Barbara are on the pillars of the fence.

The statue was damaged during World War II, but it was restored by academic sculptor Vojtech Löffler in the years 1949-1951 and 1971–1972. The last restoration, done by Ľubomír Kus, took place in 1996–1998.

== See also ==
- Plague Column, Vienna
