= Plague Column, Kutná Hora =

Monument in Czechia

Coordinates: 49.9494°N 15.2669°E

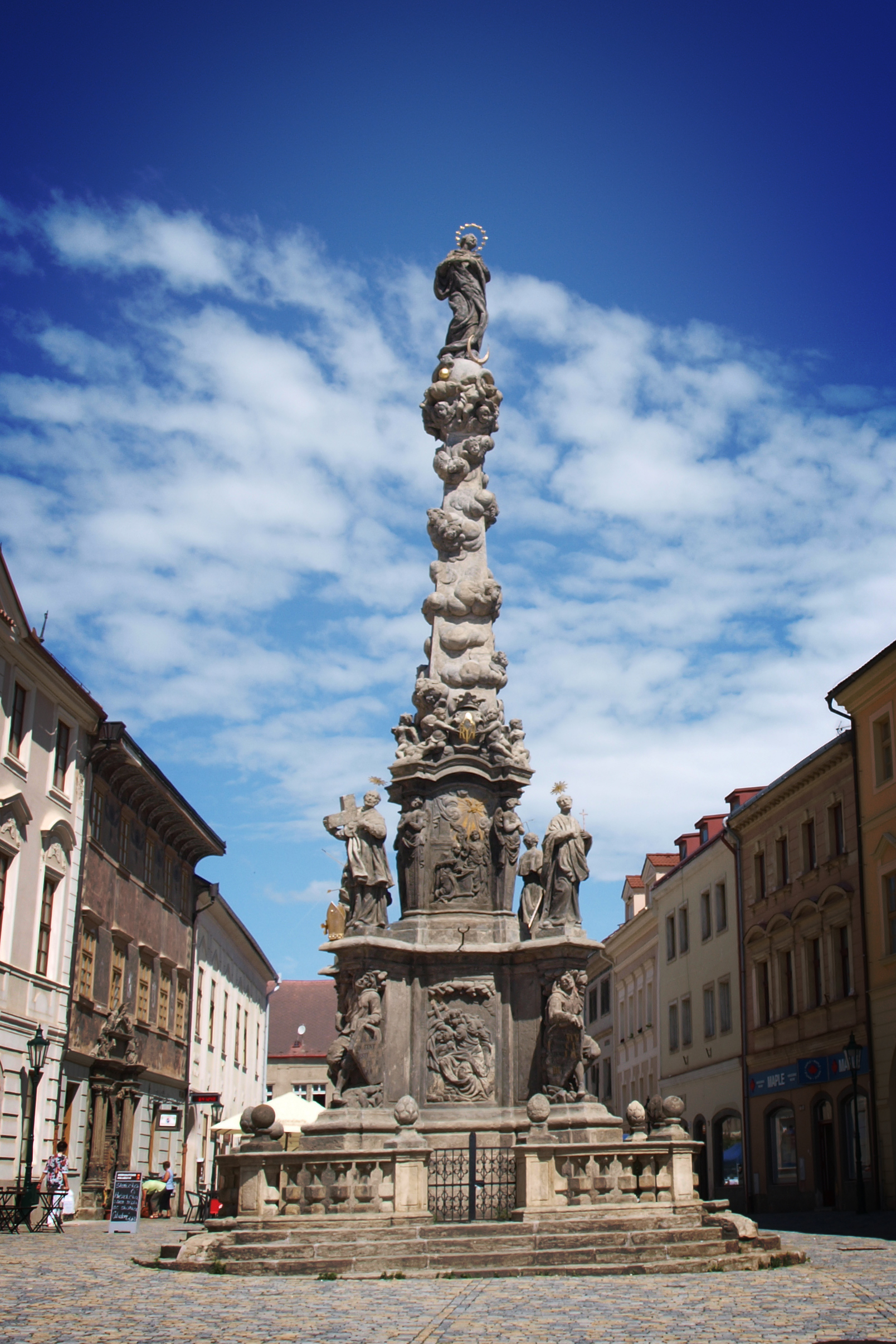
The Plague Column of the Virgin Mary Immaculate in Kutná Hora

Plague Column in Kutná Hora, also known as Column of the Virgin Mary Immaculate (Czech: Morový sloup Panny Marie Neposkvrněné), is a Marian column in Kutná Hora in the Central Bohemian Region of the Czech Republic. It is protected as a cultural monument.

== History ==
This baroque plague column was built by the Jesuit sculptor František Baugut. It originated between 1713 and 1715 as a commemoration of the contemporary plague which killed more than a thousand people. The column is decorated by the statue of the Virgin Mary Immaculate and Kutná Hora's typical labour themes (reliefs of miners).

== See also ==
- Plague Column, Vienna
