= Holy Trinity Column, Malá Strana =

Sculpture in Prague, Czech Republic

Holy Trinity Column
- Sloup Nejsvětější Trojice (Czech)
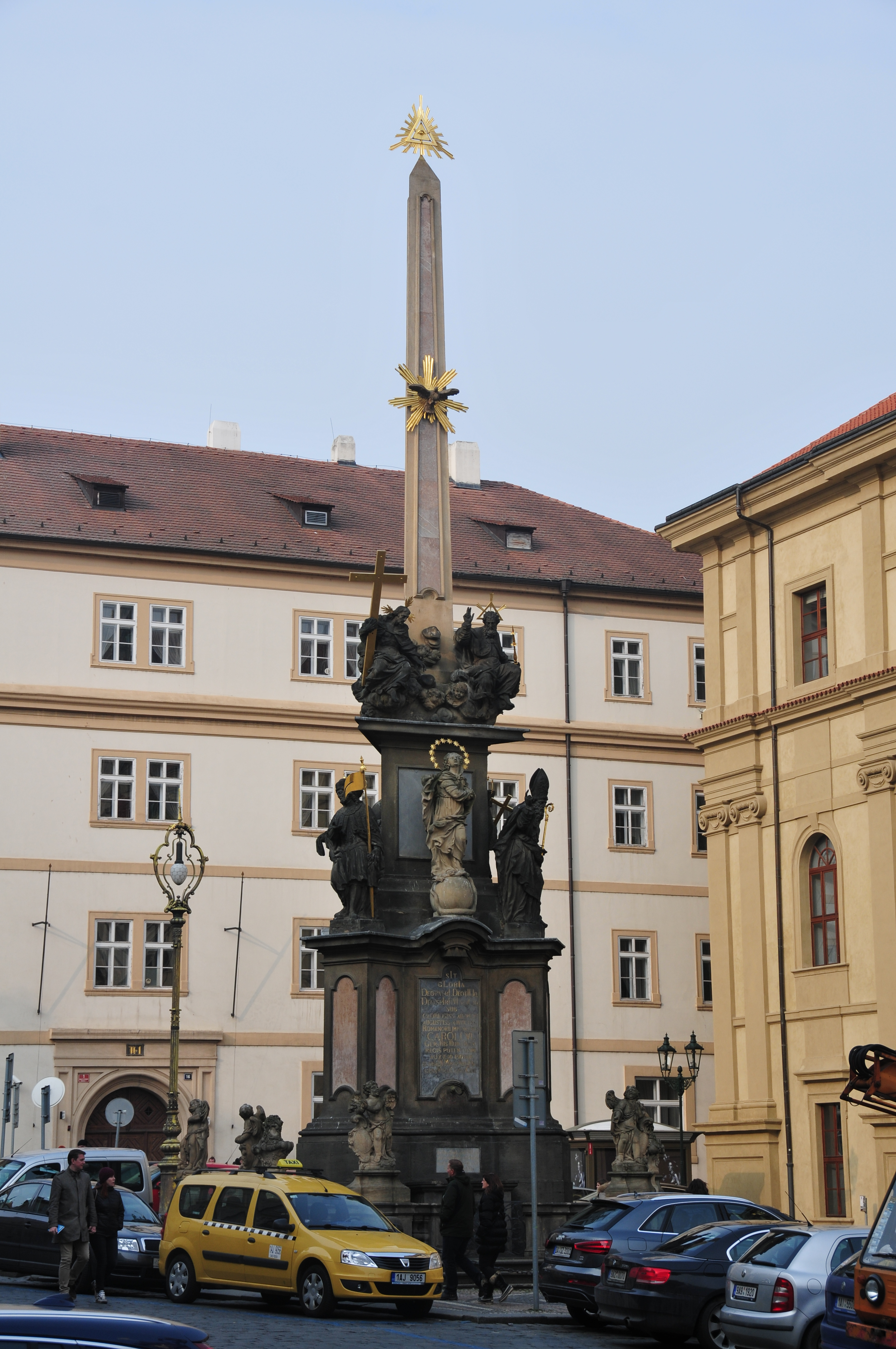
- The column in 2013
- Location: Prague, Czech Republic; 50.0883°N 14.4025°E

The Holy Trinity Column (Czech: Sloup Nejsvětější Trojice) is installed in Malá Strana, Prague, Czech Republic.

== See also ==
- Marian and Holy Trinity columns
