= Plague Column, Vienna =

Plague Column
- die Wiener Pestsäule
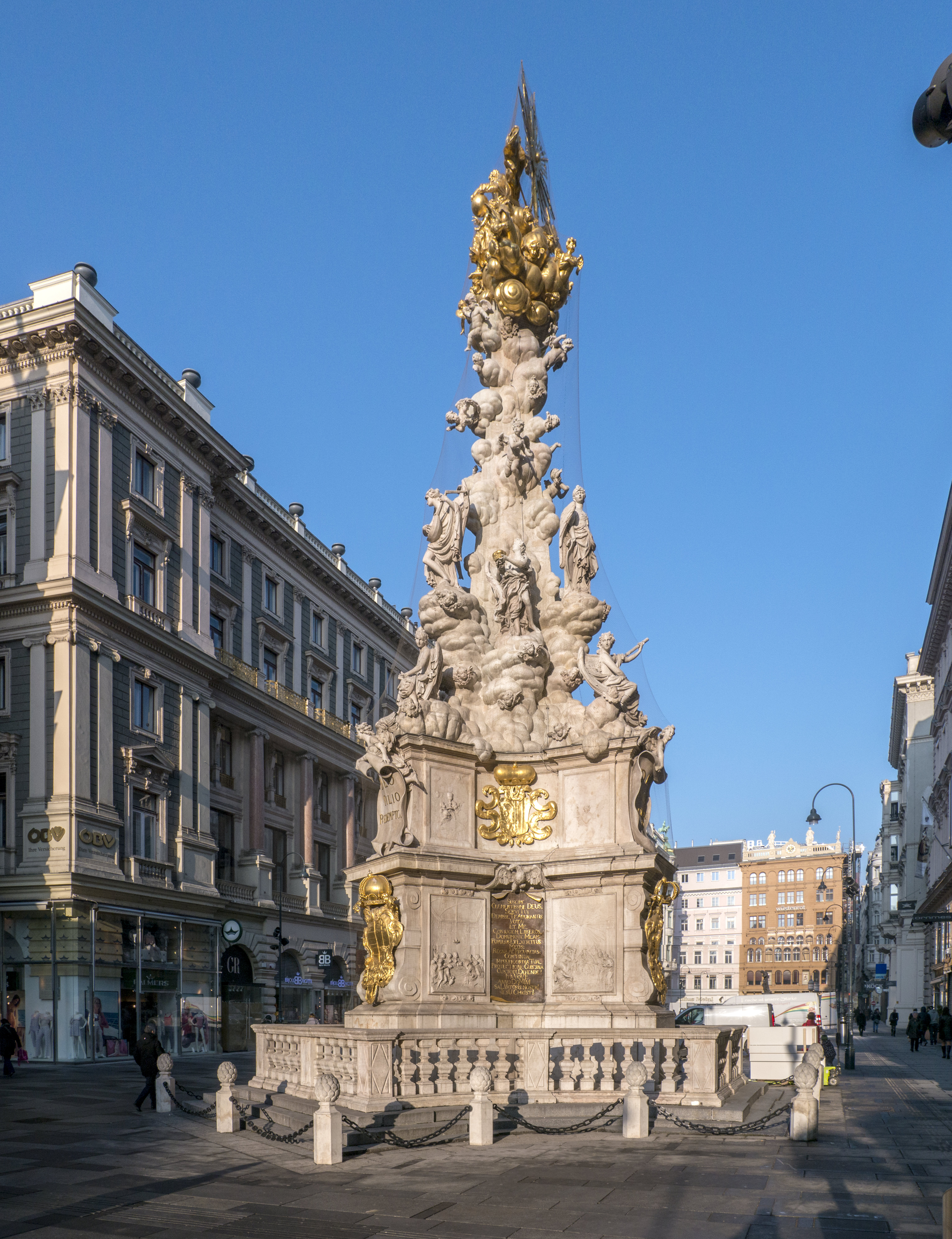
- Plague Column in Vienna
- Interactive map of the Plague Column area

General information
- Type: Holy Trinity column
- Location: Graben, Vienna, Austria
- Coordinates: 48.2087°N 16.3698°E
- Inaugurated: 1694

Height
- Architectural: High Baroque

Design and construction
- Architect: Paul Strudel

The Plague Column (German: die Wiener Pestsäule), or Trinity Column (German: Dreifaltigkeitssäule), is a Holy Trinity column located on the Graben, a street in the inner city of Vienna, Austria. Erected after the Great Plague epidemic in 1679, the Baroque memorial is one of the best known and most prominent sculptural artworks in the city. Christine M. Boeckl, author of Images of Plague and Pestilence, calls it "one of the most ambitious and innovative sculptural ensembles created anywhere in Europe in the post-Bernini era."

== History ==
In 1679, Vienna suffered one of the last great plague epidemics. Fleeing the city, the Habsburg emperor Leopold I vowed to erect a mercy column if the epidemic would end. In the same year, a provisional wooden column made by Johann Frühwirth was inaugurated, showing the Holy Trinity on a Corinthian column together with nine sculpted angels (for the Nine Choirs of Angels).

In 1683, Matthias Rauchmiller was commissioned to create a general design as well as some sculptures. Rauchmiller died in 1686, but his basic conception and three of his angel figures can still be seen on the modern monument.

Several new designs followed, among others by Johann Bernhard Fischer von Erlach, who designed the sculptures at the base of the column. Finally, the project management was assigned to Paul Strudel, who based his work on the concept of theatre engineer Lodovico Burnacini.

Below the Trinity figure, Burnacini envisioned a cloud pyramid with angel sculptures as well as the kneeling emperor Leopold, praying to a sculpture of faith. Among others, the sculptors Tobias Kracker and Johann Bendel contributed to the column. The column was inaugurated in 1694.

In spite of the long construction period, the frequent amendments of the design and the large number of sculptors involved, the monument appears quite homogeneous. During the design period, it changed from a conservative memorial column to a High Baroque scene, narrating a story in a theatrical form. The monument thus indicates the transition to the era of High Baroque in Vienna. It highly influenced the style and was imitated in the whole Austrian region.

== Iconography ==
The column has a complex iconography, the basic message of which is that the plague and the Ottomans' Second Siege of Vienna (1683), both of them punishments for sin, were averted or defeated by the piety and intercession of the Emperor Leopold I. (The pillar thus also represents a (victory) monument to that emperor.)

In the iconography, the Trinity expresses itself several times in the number three, namely vertically in three stages:

1. the pedestal, reserved for mankind, in the upper third of which Leopold I prays to God as an intercessor;
2. a second, higher level occupied by angels, in an intermediate zone between God and mankind;
3. and the highest level, reserved for the Holy Trinity.

In addition, there is also a tripartite division in plan, which establishes a connection between the sacral programme and the three parts of the Habsburg monarchy:

1. The western face is dedicated to God the Father and bears a double-headed eagle, the coat of arms of the Holy Roman Empire, as well as the coats of arms of the Inner Austrian lands, the duchies of Styria, Carinthia and Carniola. Between the western and eastern wings are the coats of arms for the core countries of the monarchy.
2. The eastern face is associated with the Son of God and bears the coats of arms of the kingdoms of Hungary, Croatia and Dalmatia, as well as Bosnia.
3. The northern face, which belongs to the Holy Spirit, is decorated with the coats of arms of the Kingdom of Bohemia, the Margraviate of Upper Lusatia and Lower Silesia, as well as the Duchy of Silesia.

== Gallery ==
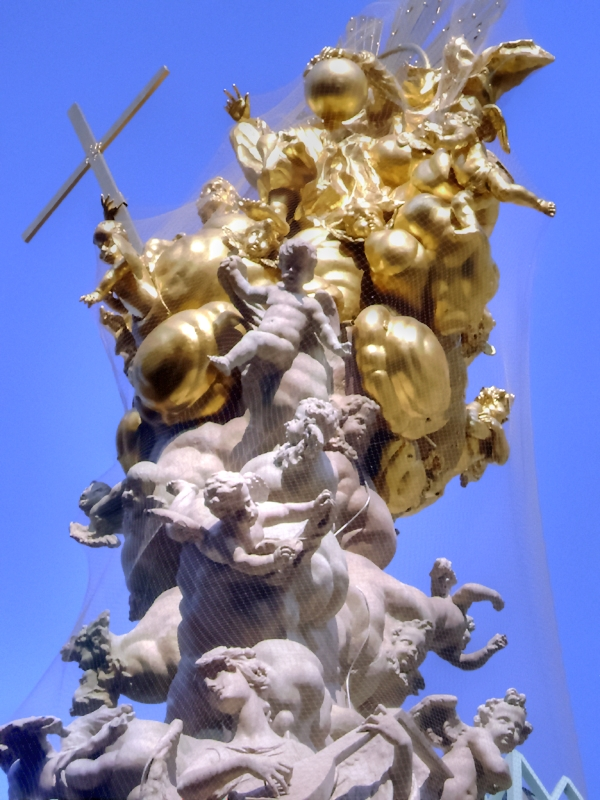
Top of the Plague Column

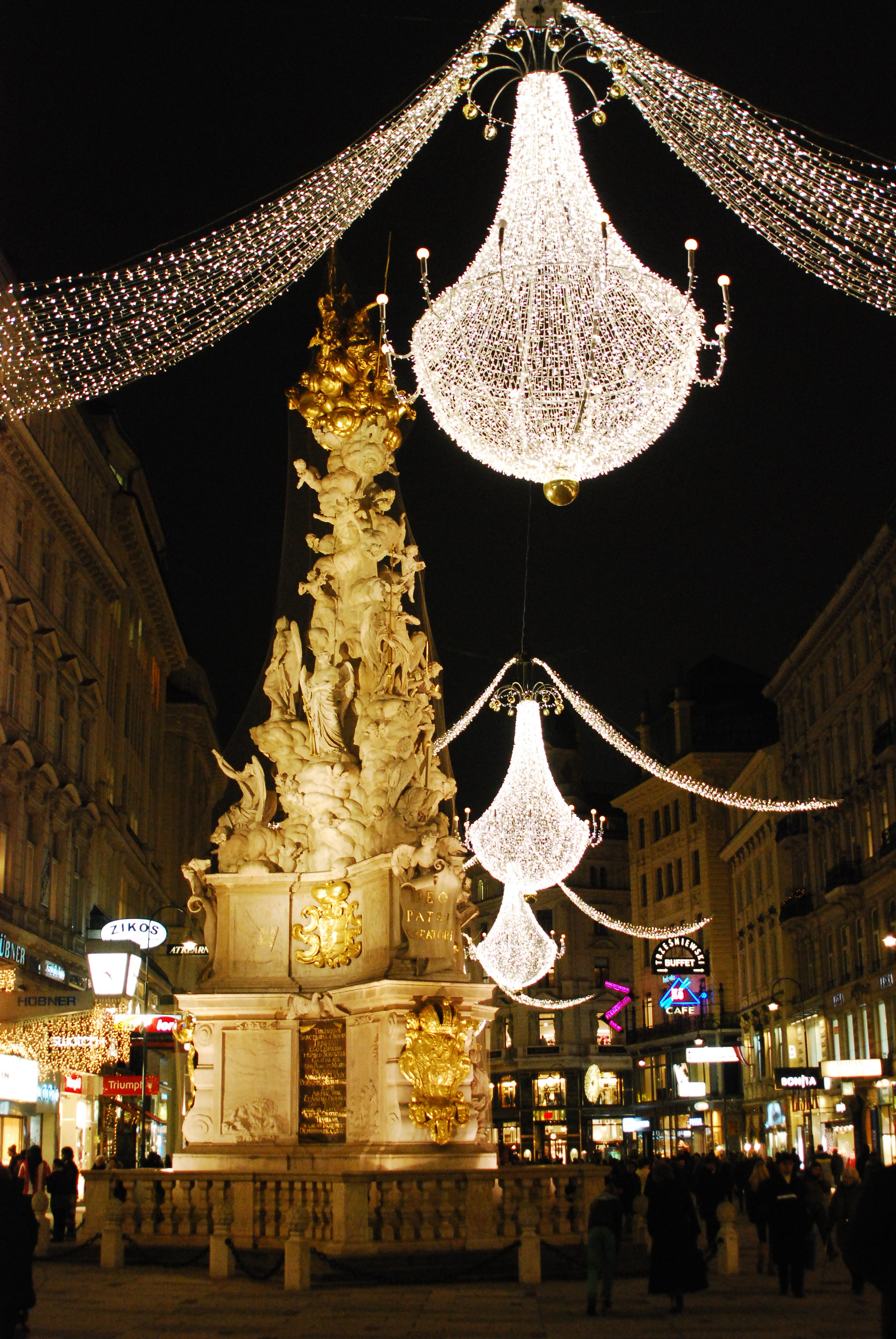
Plague Column at night

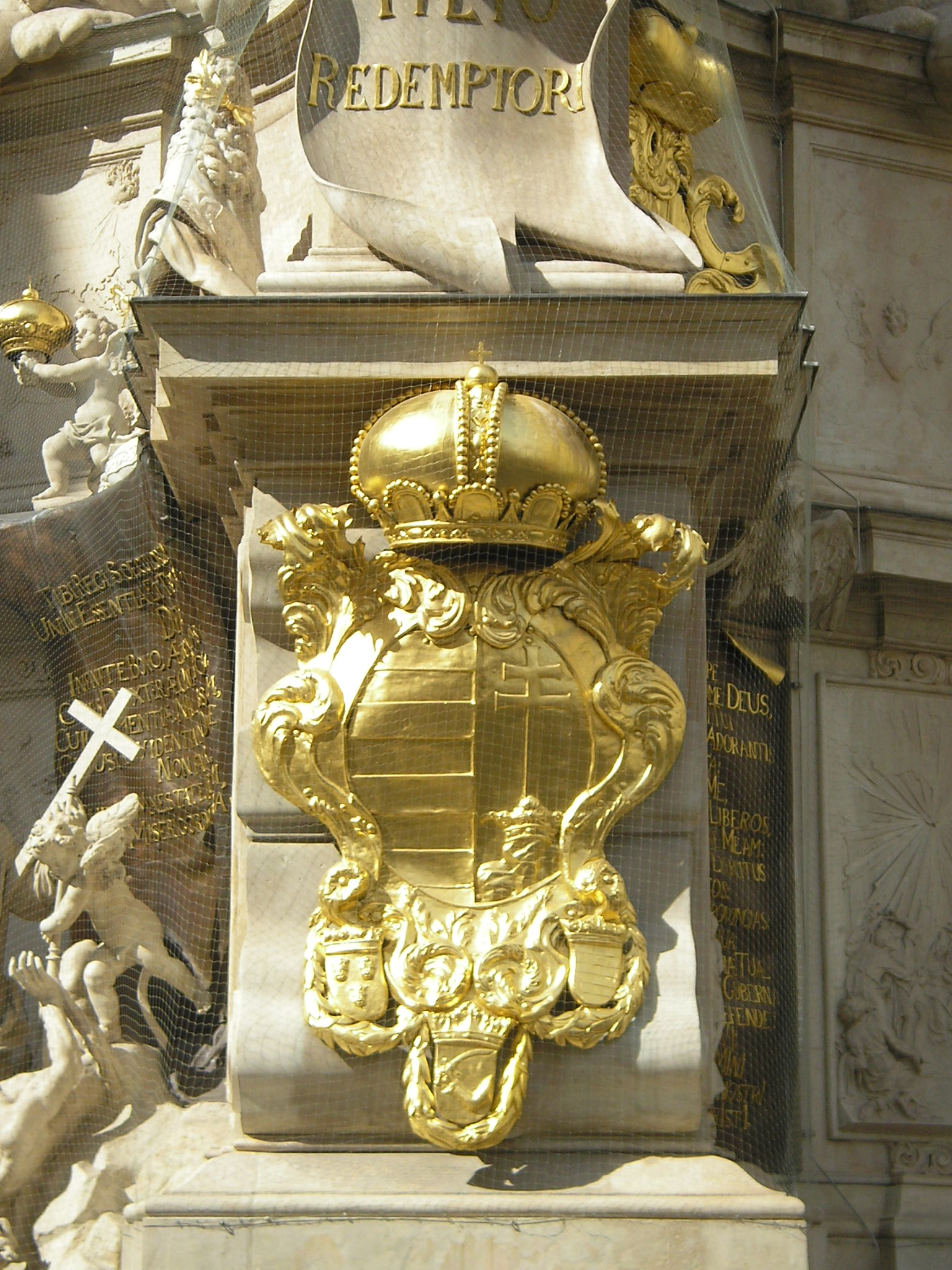
Coat of arms of Hungary

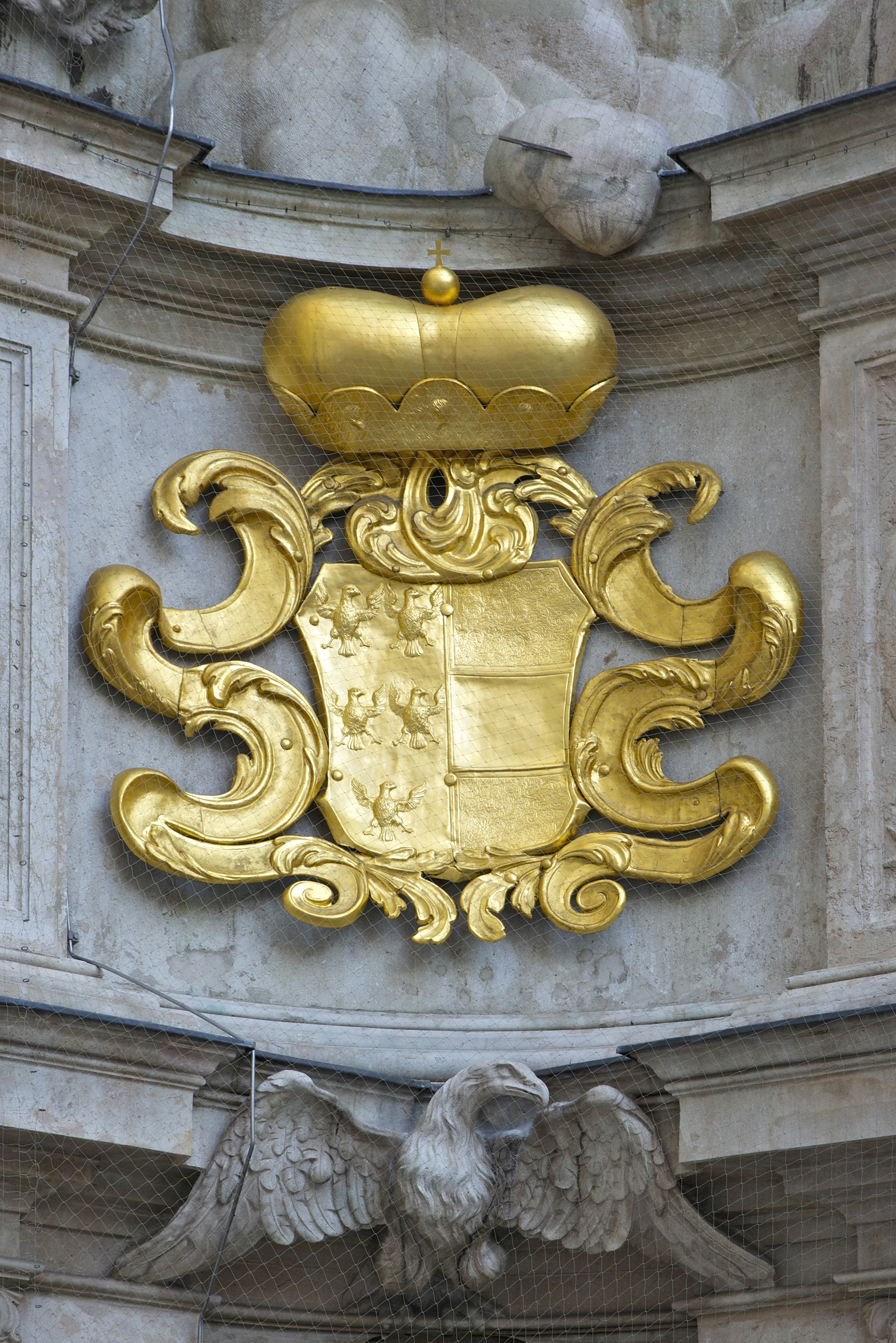
Coat of arms of the archdukes of Austria

== See also ==
- Plague Column, Košice
- Plague Column, Kutná Hora
