= Tobias Kracker =

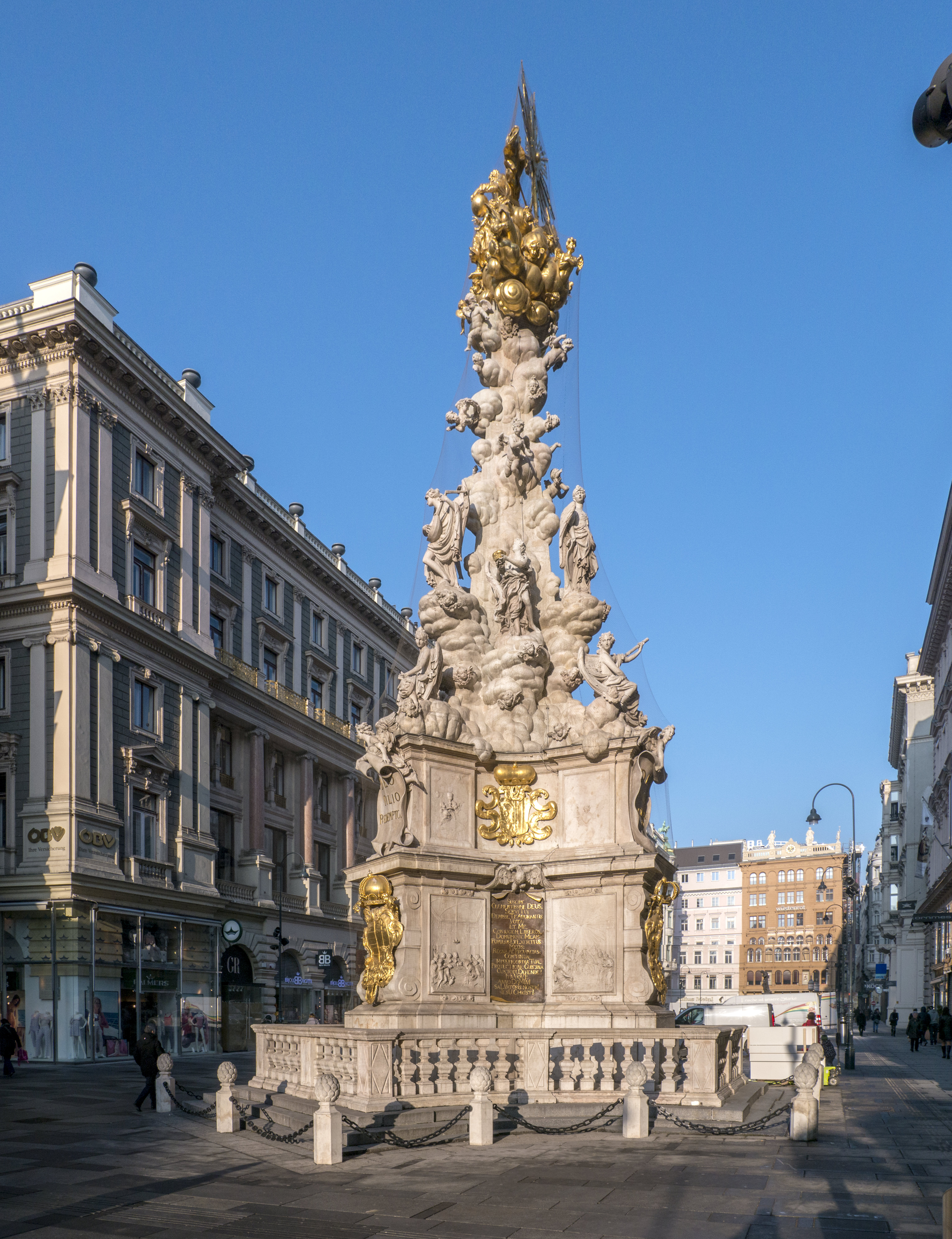
Plague Column in Vienna

Tobias Kracker (21 April 1655 - 5 February 1736) was a sculptor and painter from a family of artists who worked in Vienna during the 17th century and later throughout the Habsburg monarchy.

He was trained in the school of his eponymous father (Tobias Kracker the Elder, who died after 1691.) Their work included portal figures and altars for the Vienna Schottenstift. Other students of the school include Balthasar Permoser, who lived in Vienna, between 1670 and 1675.

Tobias Kracker the Younger collaborated with Johann Bernhard Fischer von Erlach and Paul Strudel on the work on the Vienna Plague Column.

He also created designs (based on models by Johann Lukas von Hildebrandt) for the Imperial Coffins of Emperor Leopold I (died 1705) and his oldest son Joseph I (died 1711) for the Vienna Imperial Crypt, also sometimes called the "Capuchin Crypt."
