= Marian and Holy Trinity columns =

Religious monuments depicting Virgin Mary

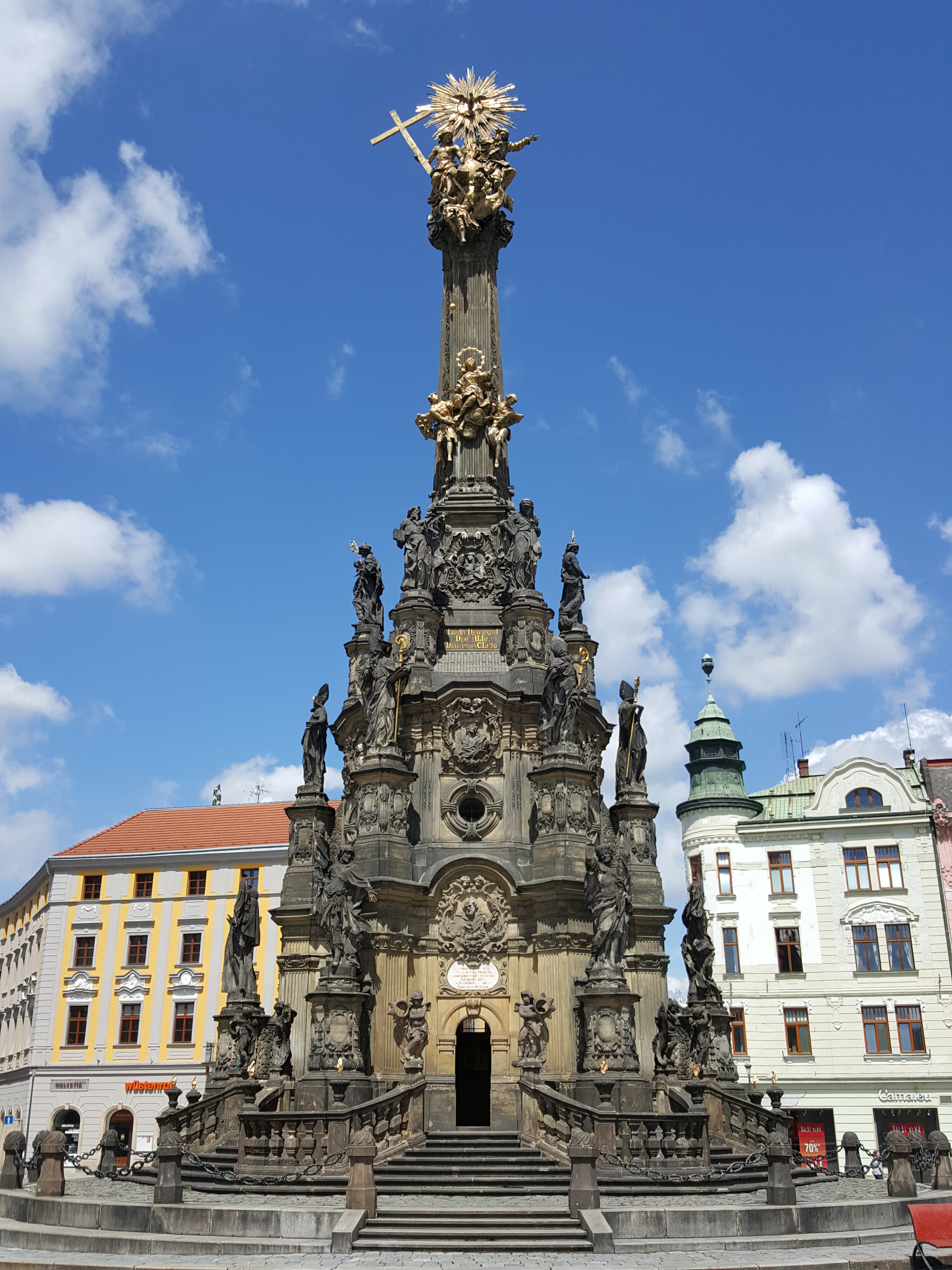
The Holy Trinity Column, Olomouc, Czech Republic, a World Heritage Site

Marian columns are religious monuments depicting the Virgin Mary on the top, often built in thanksgiving for the ending of a plague (plague columns) or for some other reason. The purpose of the Holy Trinity columns was usually simply to celebrate the church and the faith, though the plague motif could sometimes play its role in their erection as well. Erecting religious monuments in the form of a column surmounted by a figure or a Christian symbol was a gesture of public faith that flourished in the Catholic countries of Europe, especially in the 17th and 18th centuries. Thus, they became one of the most visible features of Baroque architecture. This usage also influenced some Eastern Orthodox Baroque architecture.

== History ==
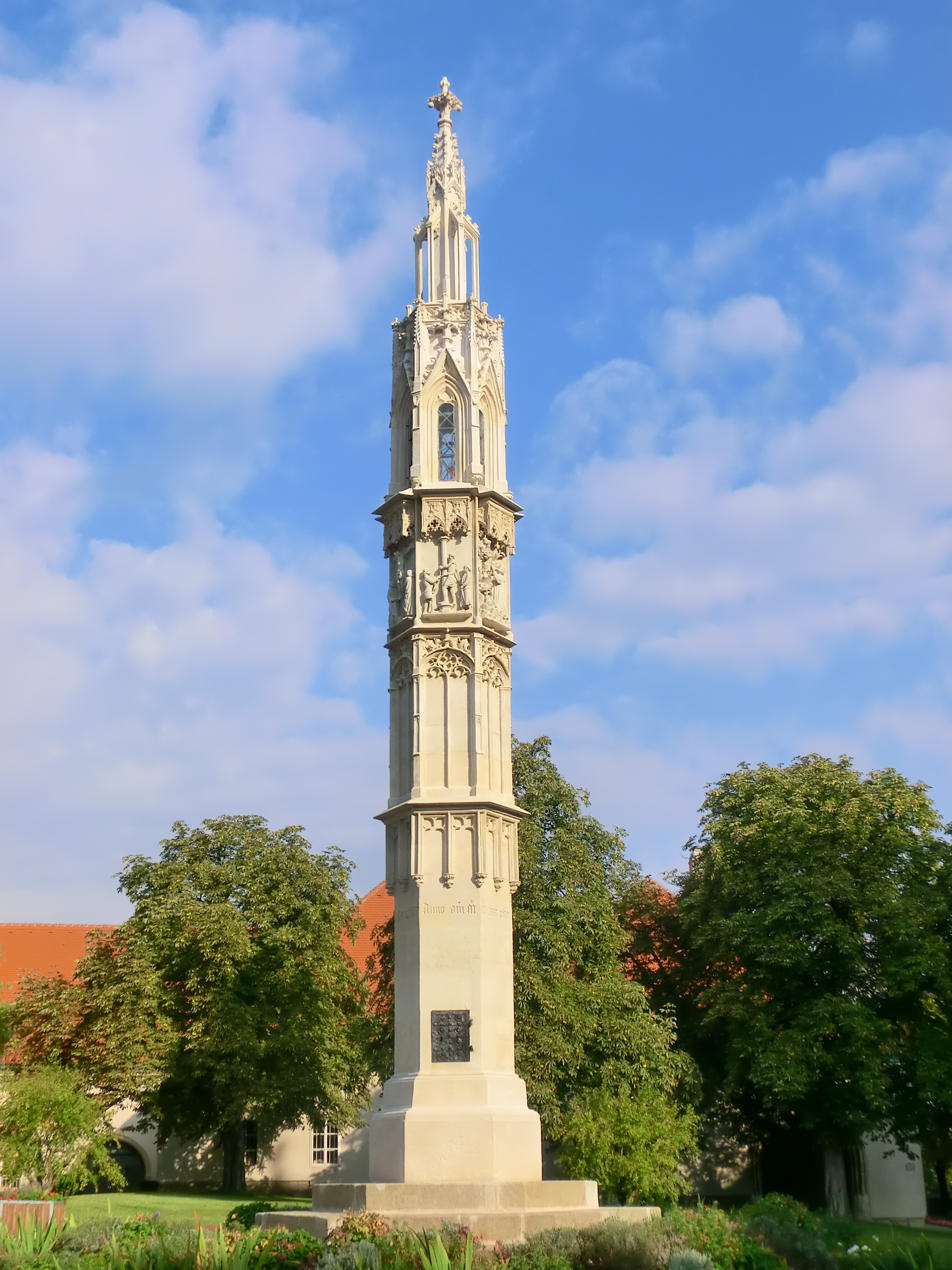
Tutzsäule, Klosterneuburg Monastery

In Imperial Rome, it was the practice to erect a statue of the Emperor atop a column. In 1381, Michael Tutz erected the gothic Tutzsäule at Klosterneuburg Monastery to mark the ending of an epidemic.

The Christian practice of erecting a column topped with a statue of the Virgin Mary became common especially in the Counter-Reformation period following the Council of Trent (1545–1563).

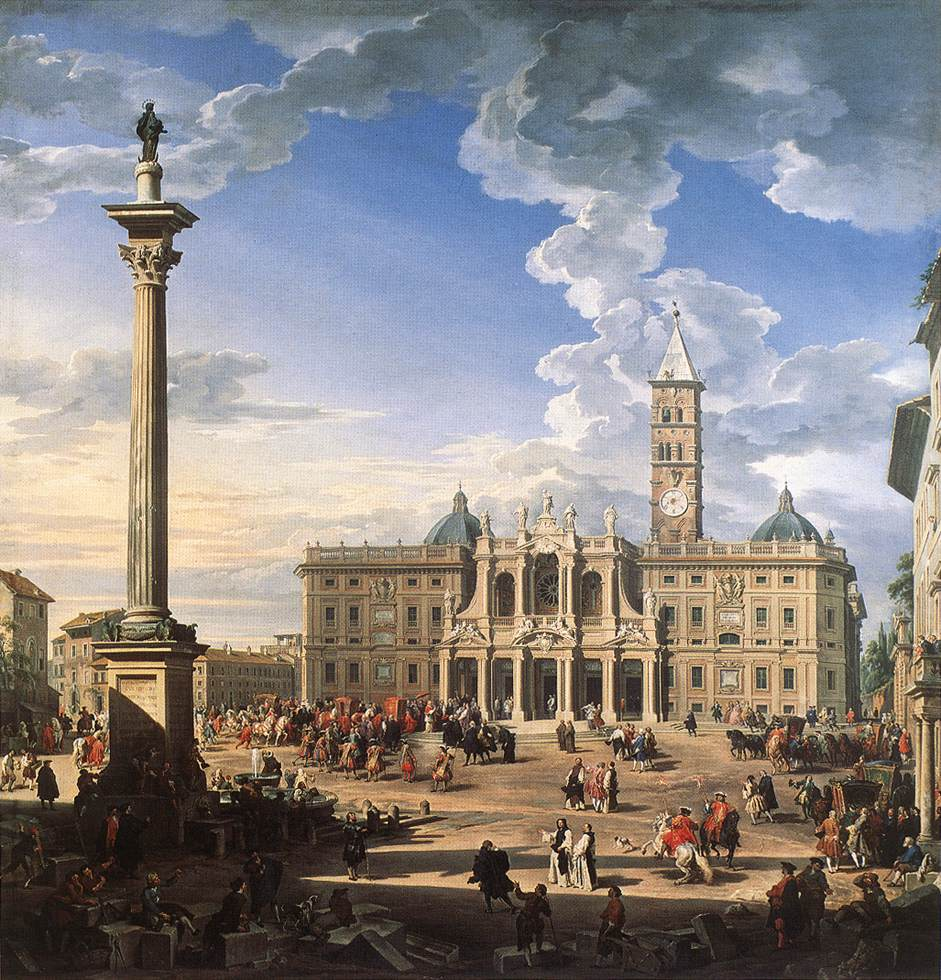
The Marian column in front of the Basilica di Santa Maria Maggiore in Rome

The column in Piazza Santa Maria Maggiore in Rome was one of the first. Erected in 1614, it was designed by Carlo Maderno during the papacy of Paul V. Maderno's fountain at the base combines the armorial eagles and dragons of Paul V (Borghese). The column, with a Corinthian capital, is topped with a statue of the Virgin and the child Jesus. The column itself is ancient: it had supported the vault of the so-called Basilica of Constantine in the Roman Forum, destroyed by an earthquake in the 9th century. By the 17th century only this column survived; in 1614 it was transported to Piazza Santa Maria Maggiore and crowned with a bronze statue of the Virgin and Child made by Domenico Ferri. In a papal bull from the year of its installation, the pope decreed an indulgence for those who uttered a prayer to the Virgin while saluting the column. Within decades it served as a model for many columns in Italy and other European countries.

== Dreifaltigkeitssäule ==
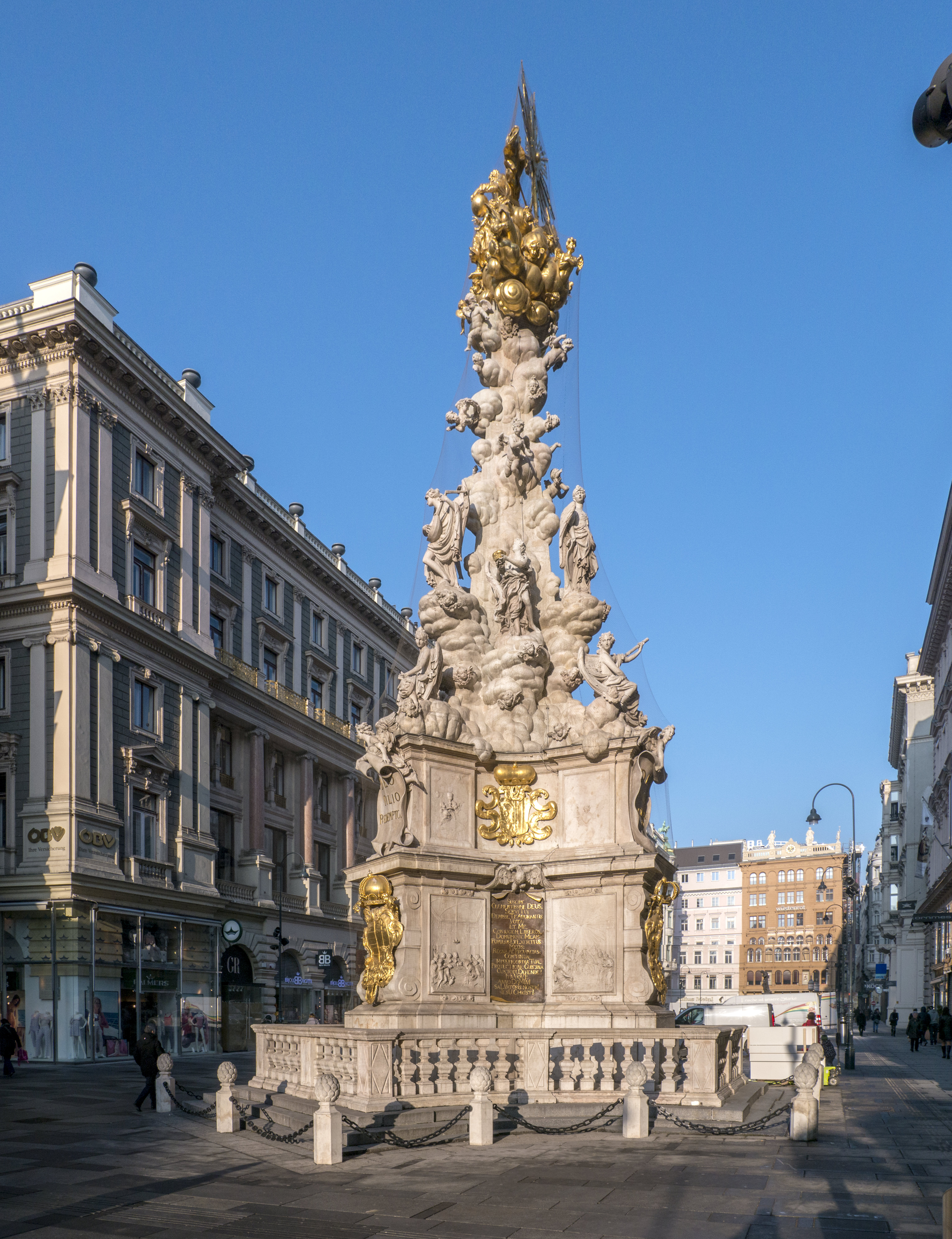
Plague Column, Vienna, Austria

The basic model which inspired building most Holy Trinity columns is that in the Grabenplatz, Vienna, built after the 1679 plague; in this monument the column, has entirely disappeared in marble clouds and colossal saints, angels and putti. The column became a site of pilgrimage during the COVID-19 pandemic.

There is a Holy Trinity Column in Holy Trinity Square, in front of Matthias Church in Budapest, a plague memorial erected in 1713, which served as a model for many similar works in the country.

The era of these religious structures culminated with the outstanding Holy Trinity Column in Horní Square in Olomouc. This monument, built shortly after the plague which struck Moravia (nowadays in the Czech Republic) between 1714 and 1716, was exceptional because of its monumentality, rich decoration and unusual combination of sculptural material (stone and gilded copper). Its base was made so big that even a chapel was hidden inside. This column is the only one which has been individually inscribed on the UNESCO World Heritage List as "one of the most exceptional examples of the apogee of central European Baroque artistic expression".

There is also a Holy Trinity Column in the main square of Linz. The Holy Trinity Column in Teplice was designed by Matthias Braun and erected in thanksgiving for the city having been spared the plague in 1713. Braun also designed the Marian column in Jaroměř.

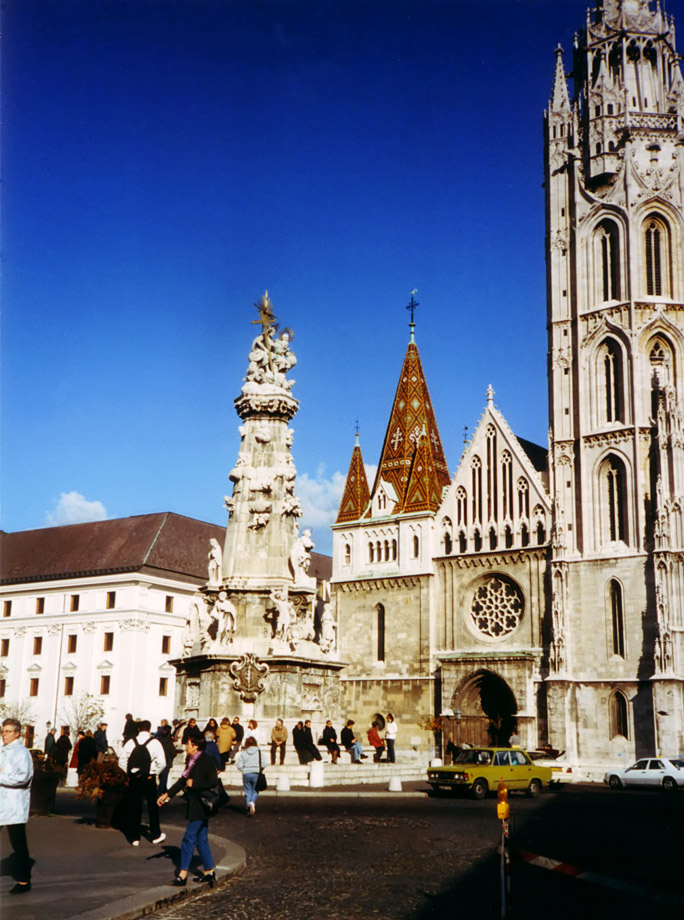
Holy Trinity Column, Matthias church, Budapest

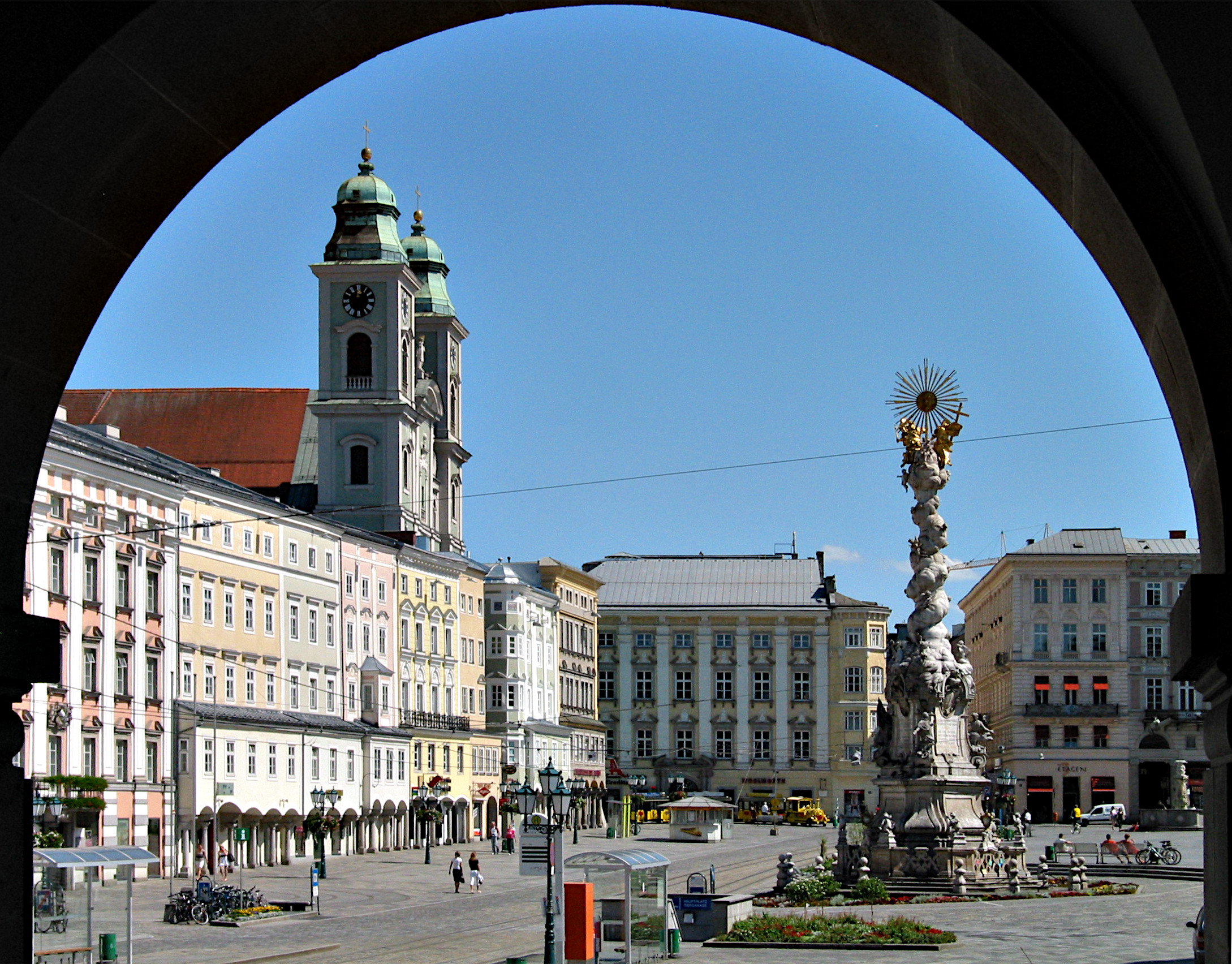
Holy Trinity Column Linz, Austria

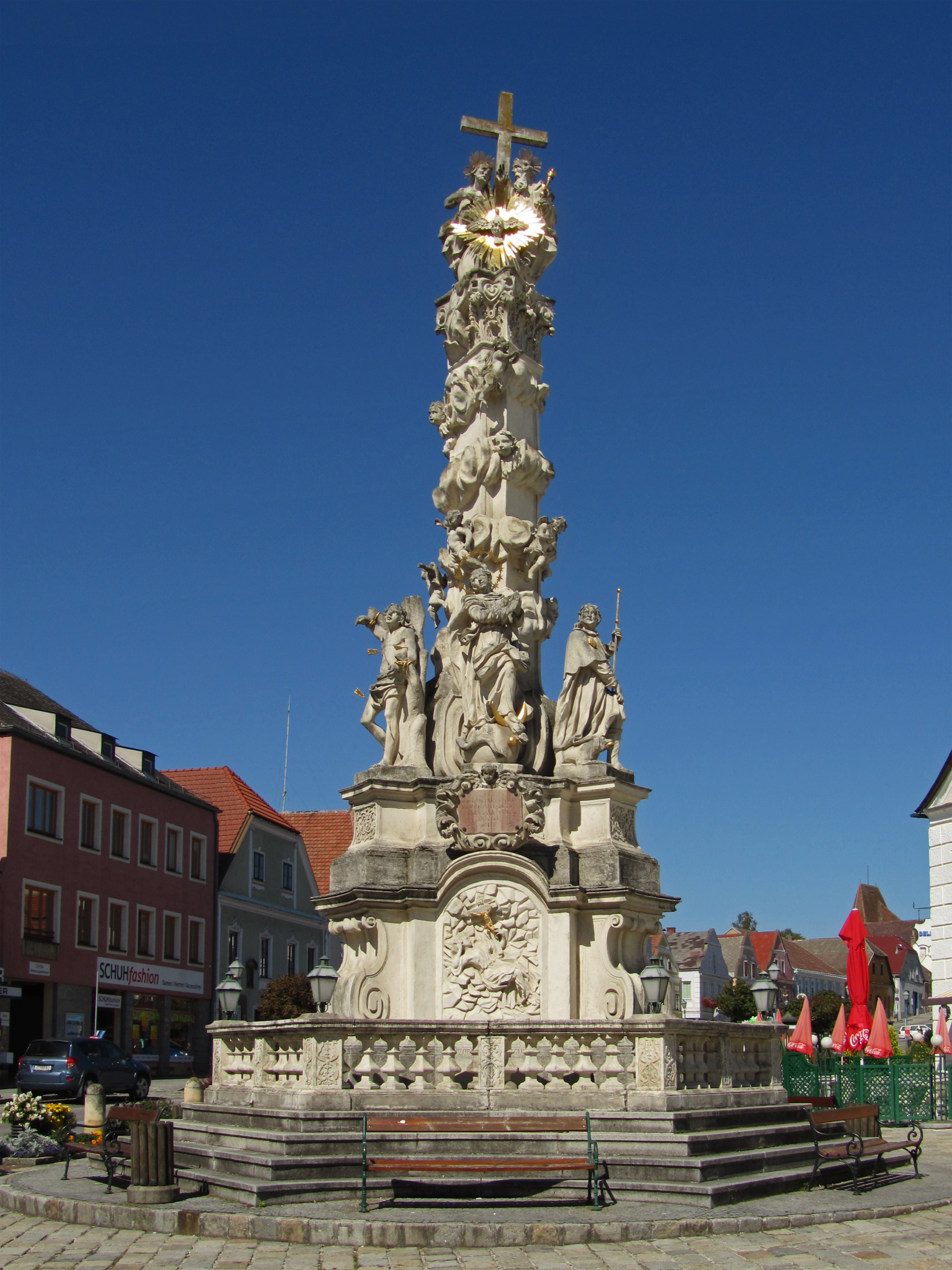
Dreifaltigkeitssäule, Zwettl

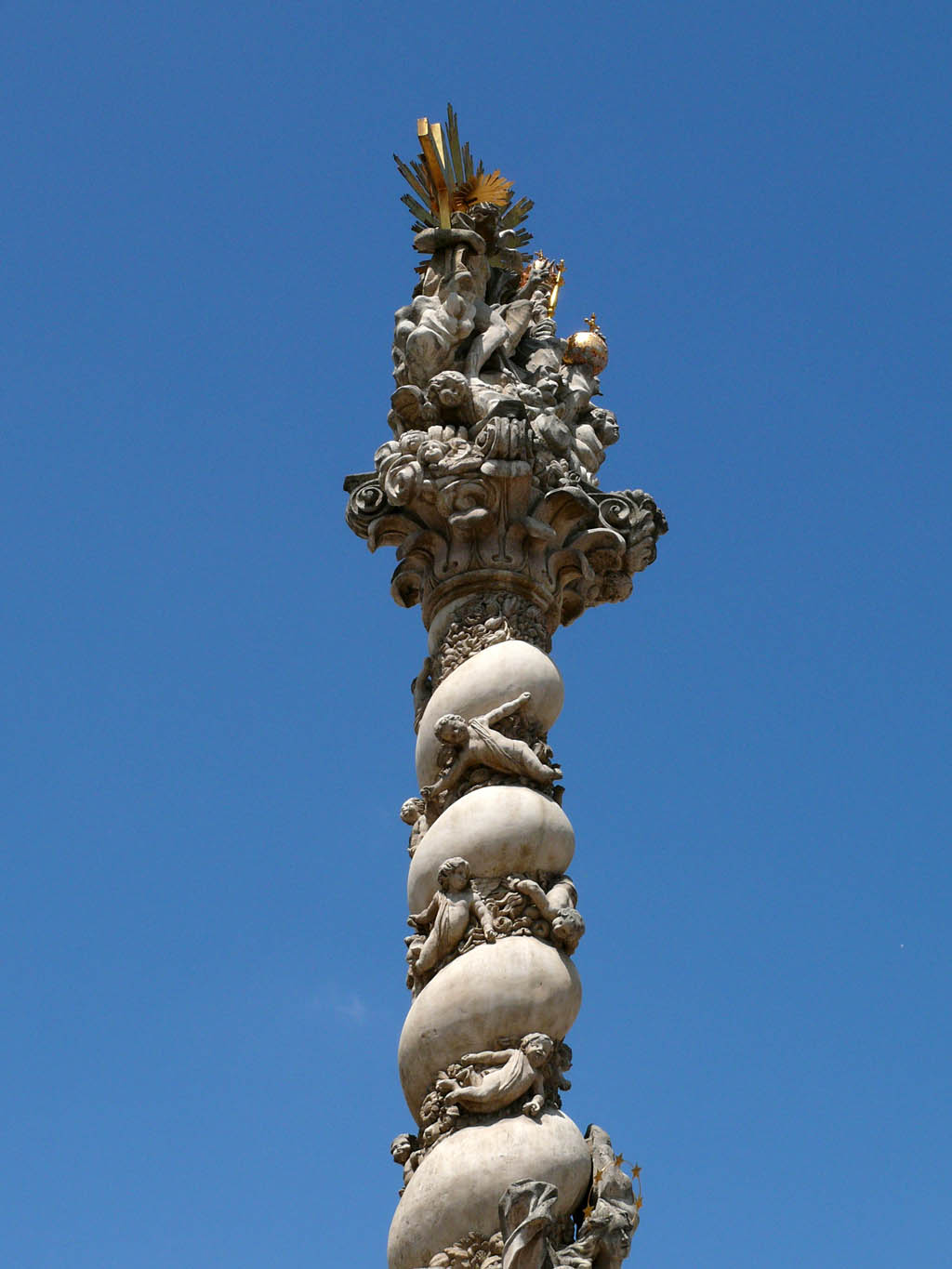
Dreifaltigkeitssäule, Sopron

== Mariensäule ==
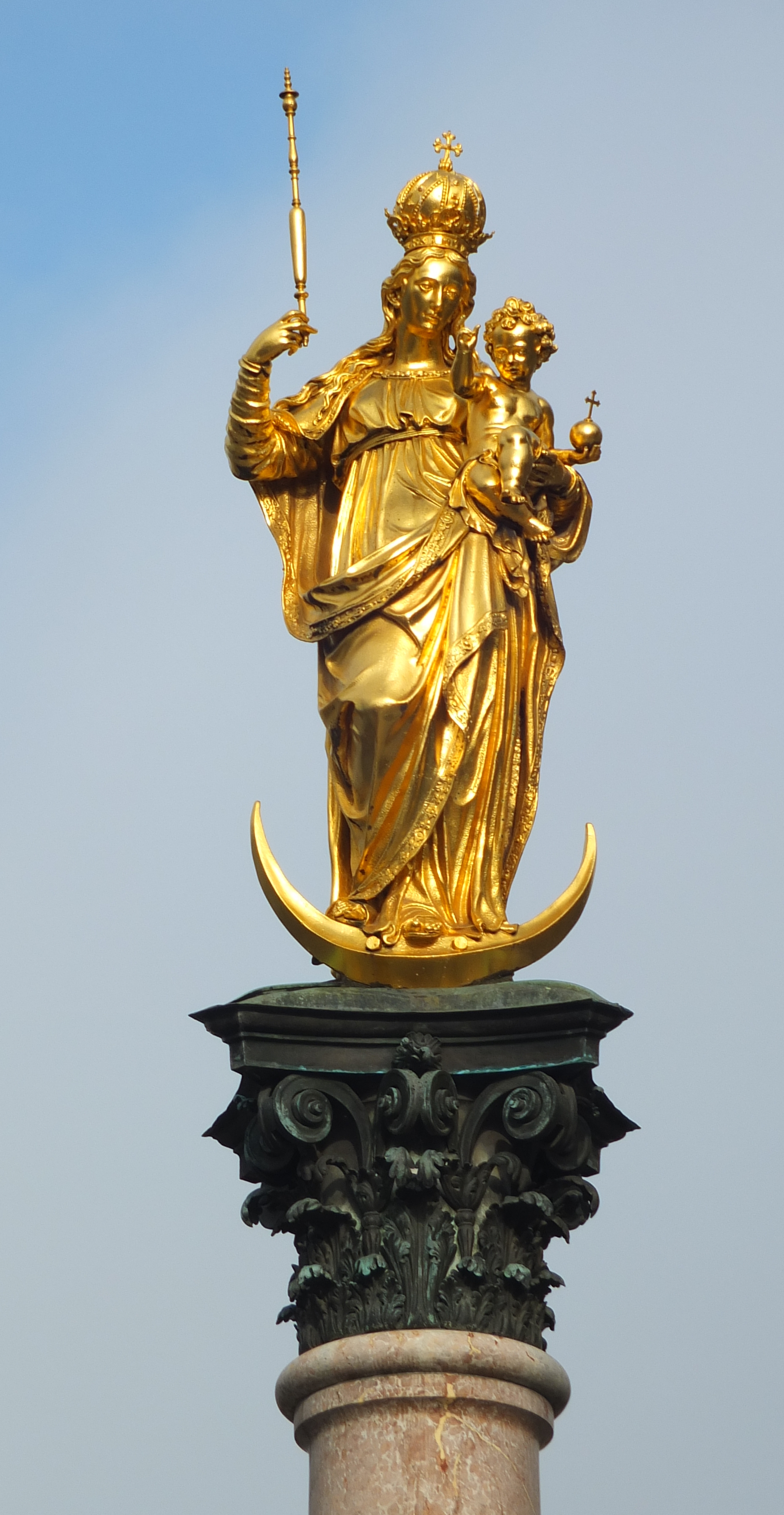
Mariensäule on Marienplatz, Munich

The first column of this type north of the Alps was the Mariensäule built in Munich in 1638 to celebrate the sparing of the city from both the invading Swedish army and the plague. The statue, created in 1590, depicts the Virgin Mary as Queen of Heaven standing atop a crescent moon. It inspired for example Marian columns in Prague and Vienna, but many others also followed very quickly. In the countries which used to belong to the Habsburg monarchy (especially Austria, Hungary, the Czech Republic, and Slovakia) it is quite exceptional to find an old town square without such a column, usually located in the most prominent place.

The Prague column was built in Old Town Square shortly after the Thirty Years' War in thanksgiving to the Virgin Mary Immaculate for helping in the fight with the Swedes. At noon its shadow indicated the so-called Prague Meridian, which was used to check the exact solar time. Some Czechs connected its placement and erection with the hegemony of the Habsburgs in their country, and after declaring the independence of Czechoslovakia in 1918 a crowd of people pulled this old monument down and destroyed it in an excess of revolutionary fervor. The column was rebuilt in 2020.

The Column of the Virgin Mary Immaculate in Kutná Hora was constructed by the Jesuit sculptor František Baugut between 1713 and 1715 to commemorate the recent plague.

The Marian column in Český Krumlov's town square was completed in 1716. At the base are statues of SS. Sebastian, Wencelaus and Vitus. It commemorates the plague of 1697. In gratitude for the end of the plague in 1680 at Maribor, a plague column was built in 1681, with the original being replaced in 1743. Arranged around a pillar bearing an image of Virgin Mary, are six saints, all intercessors against the plague.

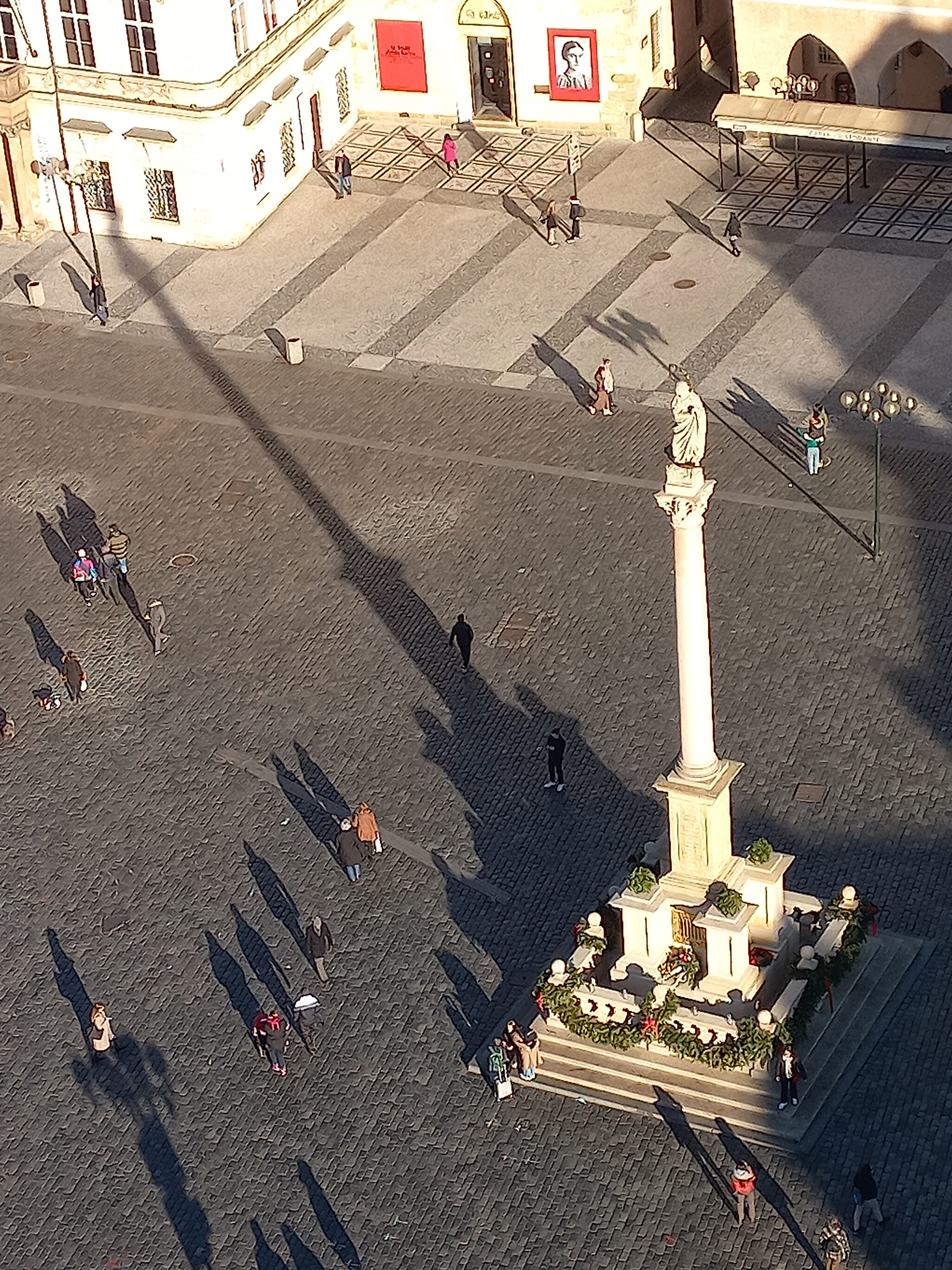
Marián column Prague

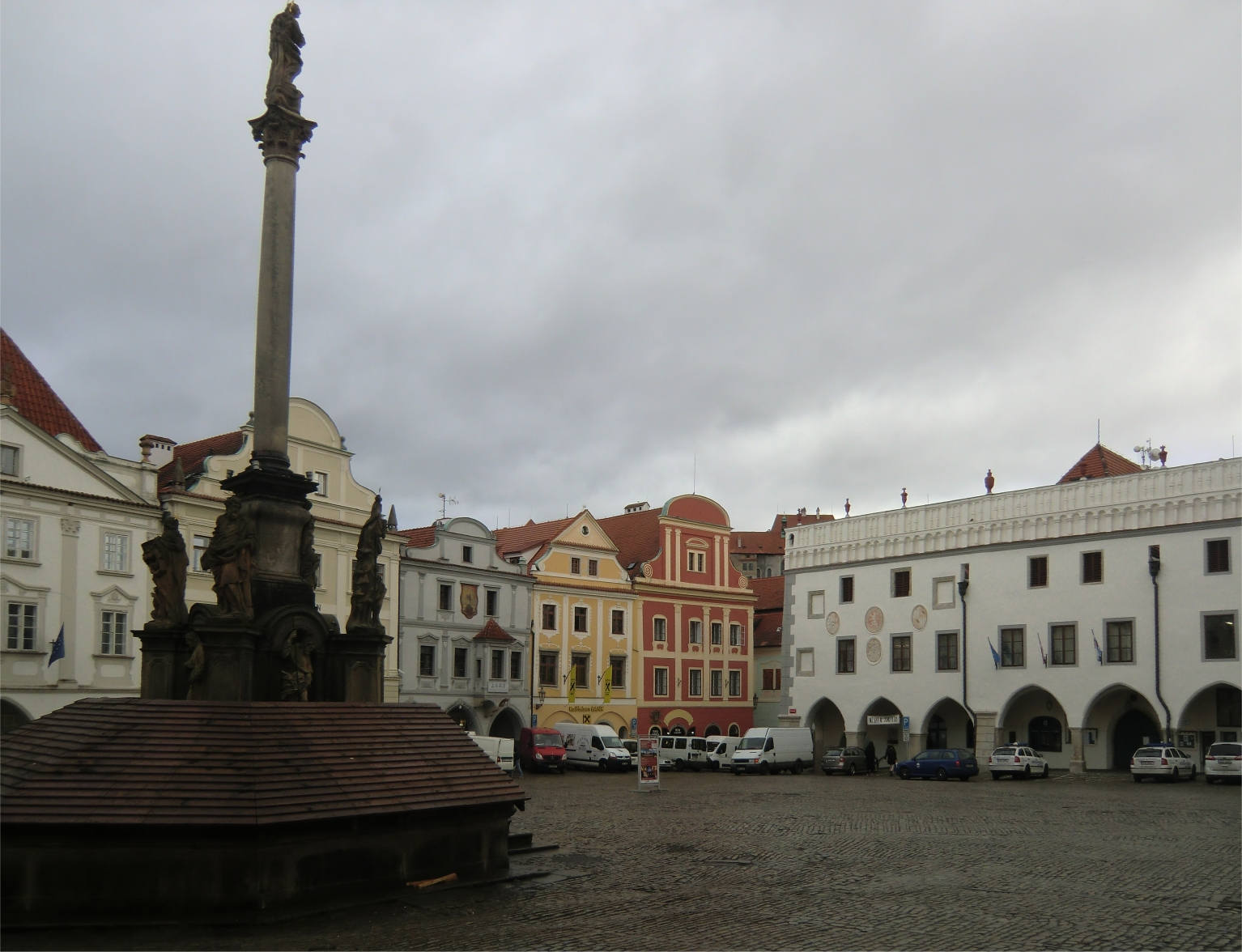
Marian column Cesky Krumlov town square

== Pestsäule ==
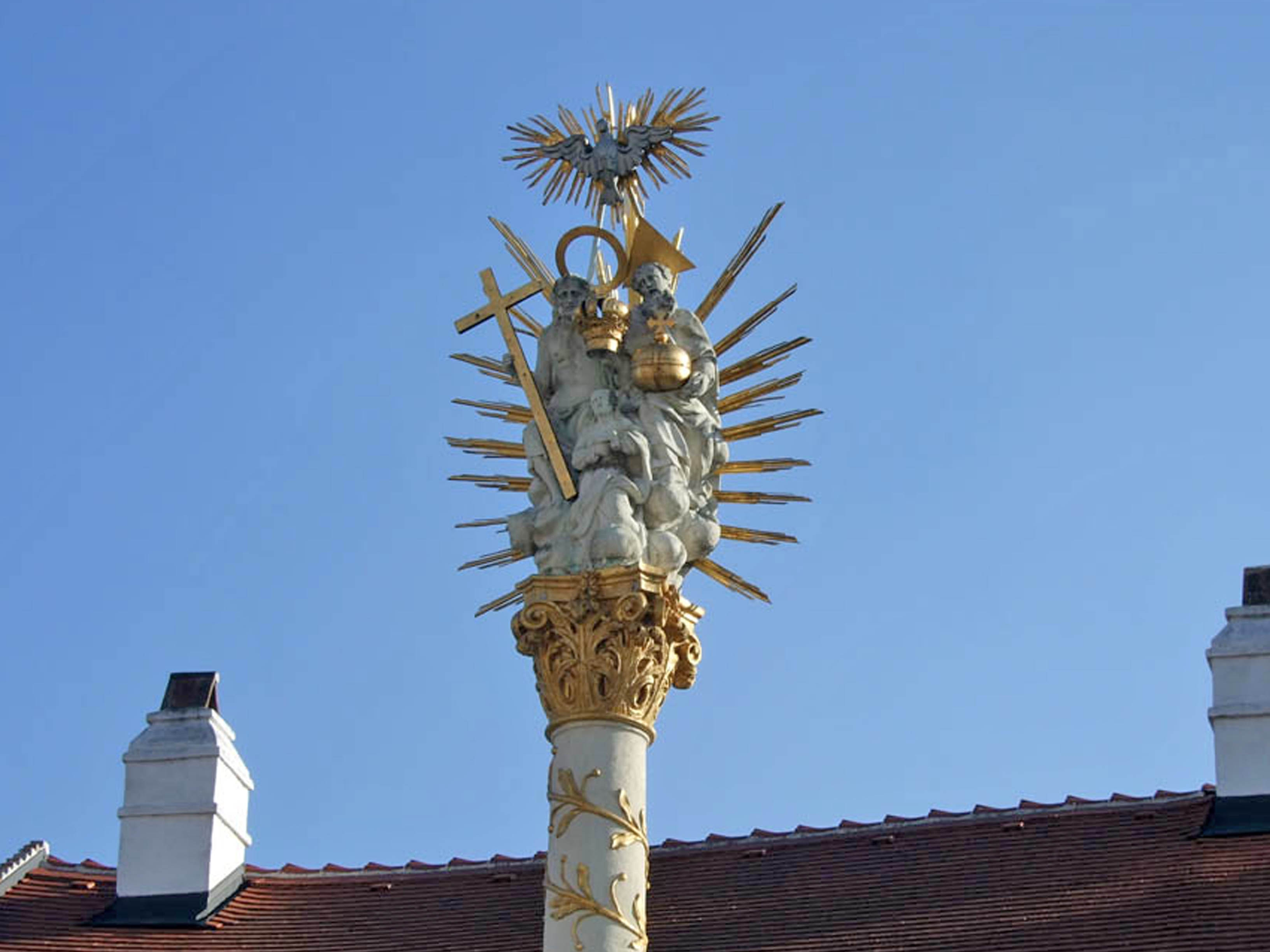
Plague Column, Eisenstadt

Over time distinctions between a Marian column and a plague column blurred. Although plague columns are most commonly dedicated to the Virgin Mary, some depict other saints.

The Plague Column at Eisenstadt was erected in 1713 in honour of the Holy Trinity and by Mary, as Queen of heaven as a plea to God to free the city from the plague. On the pedestal there are represented Saints Roch, Sebastian, Kajetan, John of Nepomuk, Saint Rosalie, and Saint Francis.

The Guglia di San Domenico designed by Cosimo Fanzago, was erected after the plague of 1656.

St. Sebastian, a martyr whose statue also often decorates these structures, was originally the patron of archers. In the Middle Ages Sebastian took the place of the plague-dealing archer Apollo, as people sometimes metaphorically compared the random nature of plague to random shots of archers, and thus he started being connected with the plague too; as was St. Roch, who is said to have fallen ill when helping the sick during an epidemic of plague and who recovered through the strength of his faith.

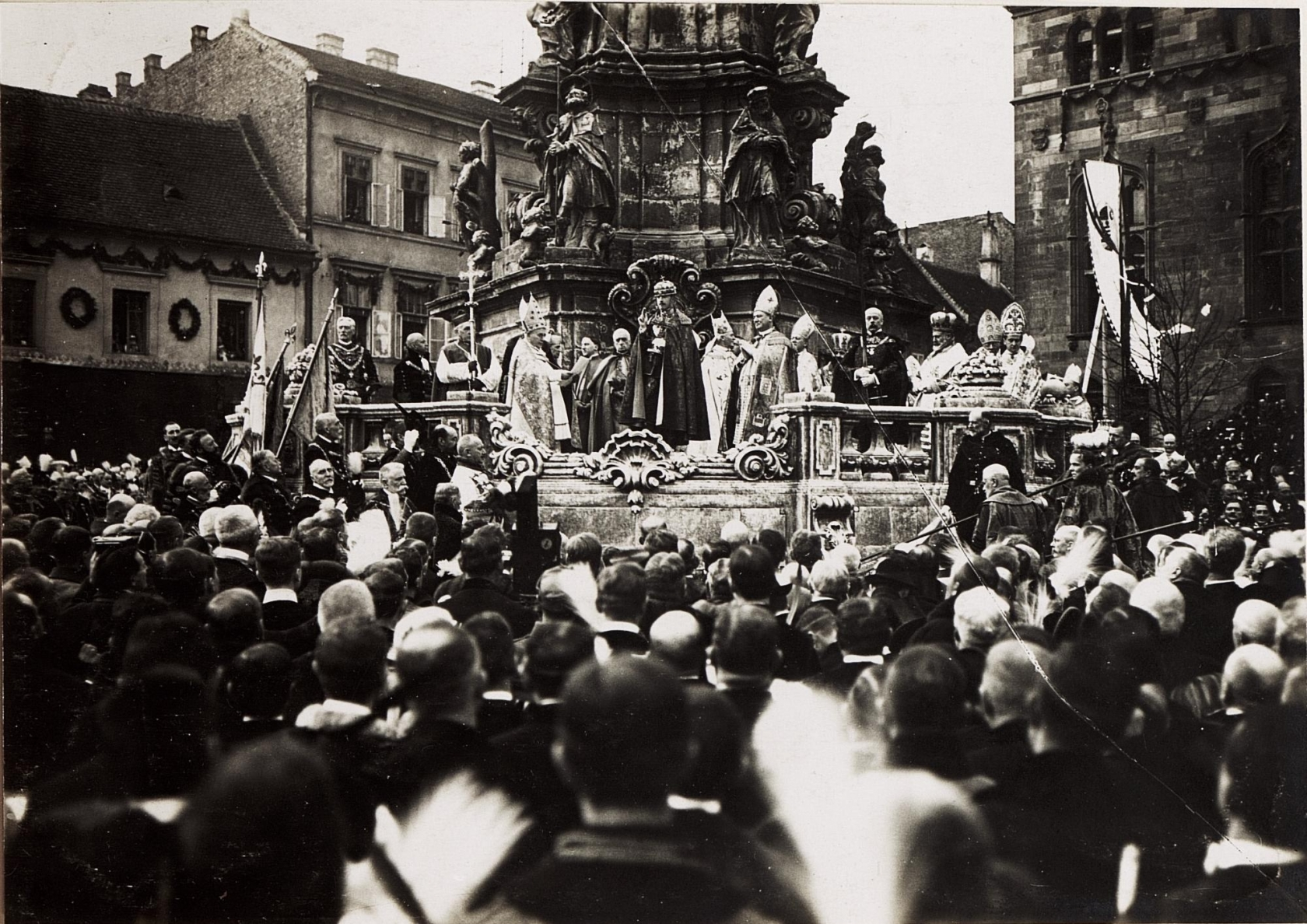
King Charles IV of Hungary, taking his Coronation Oath on 30 December 1916 at Holy Trinity Column in Budapest

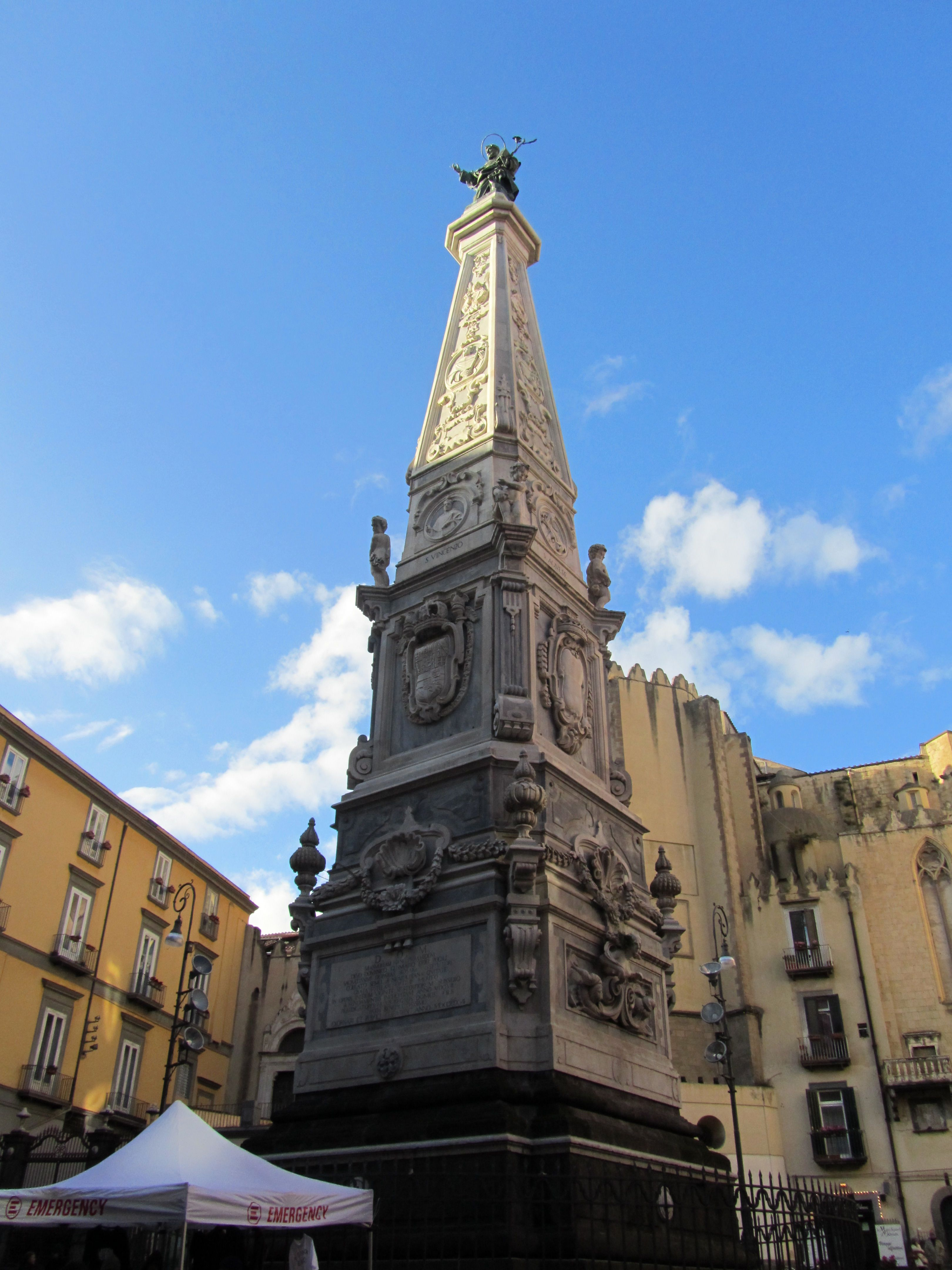
Obelisco di san Domenico (Napoli)

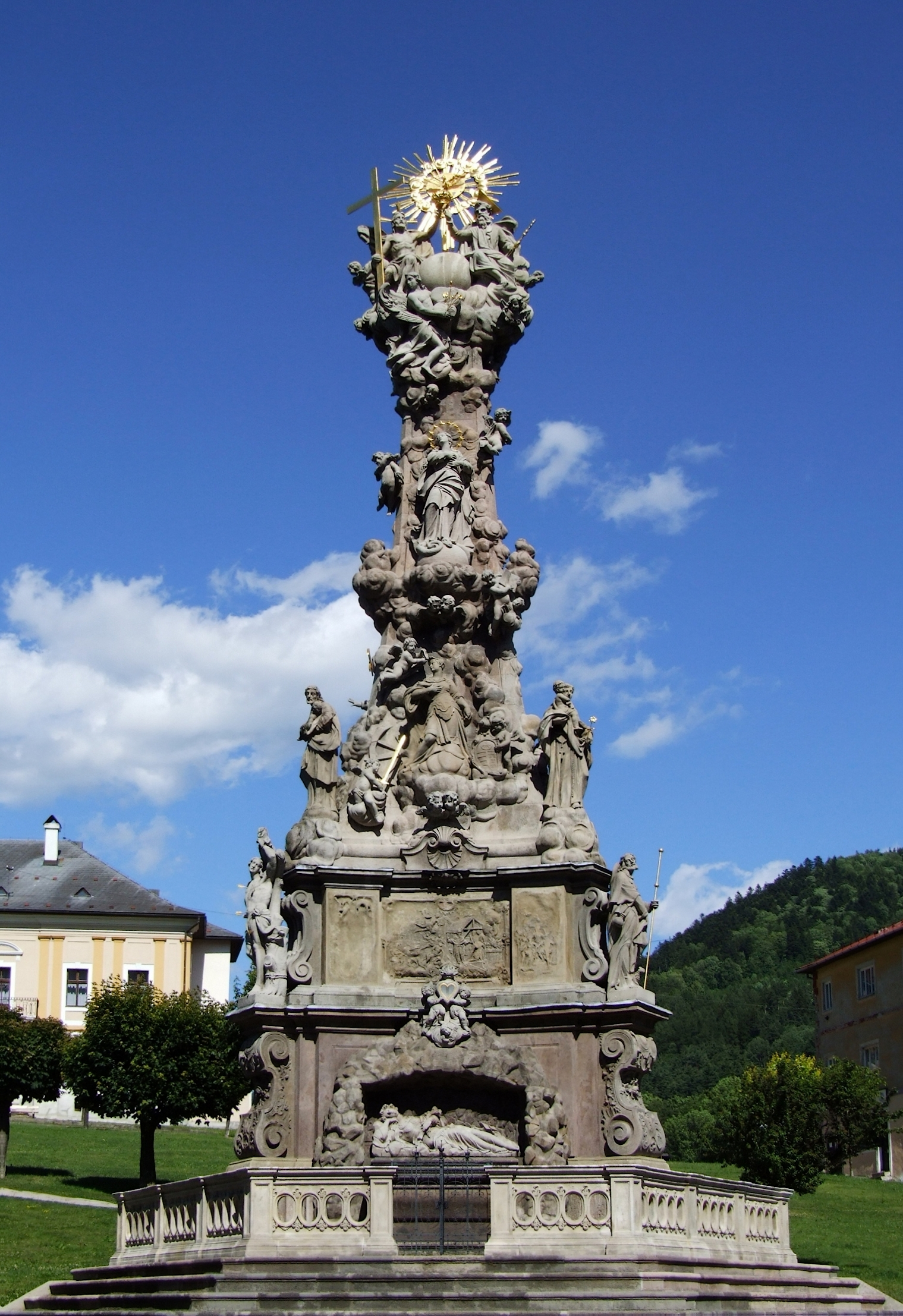
Plague Column, Kremnica

== See also ==
- Holy Trinity Column, Malá Strana
- Plague cross
- Votive column
