= Mariensäule =

Marian column in Munich, Bavaria, Germany

Coordinates: 48.1372°N 11.5755°E

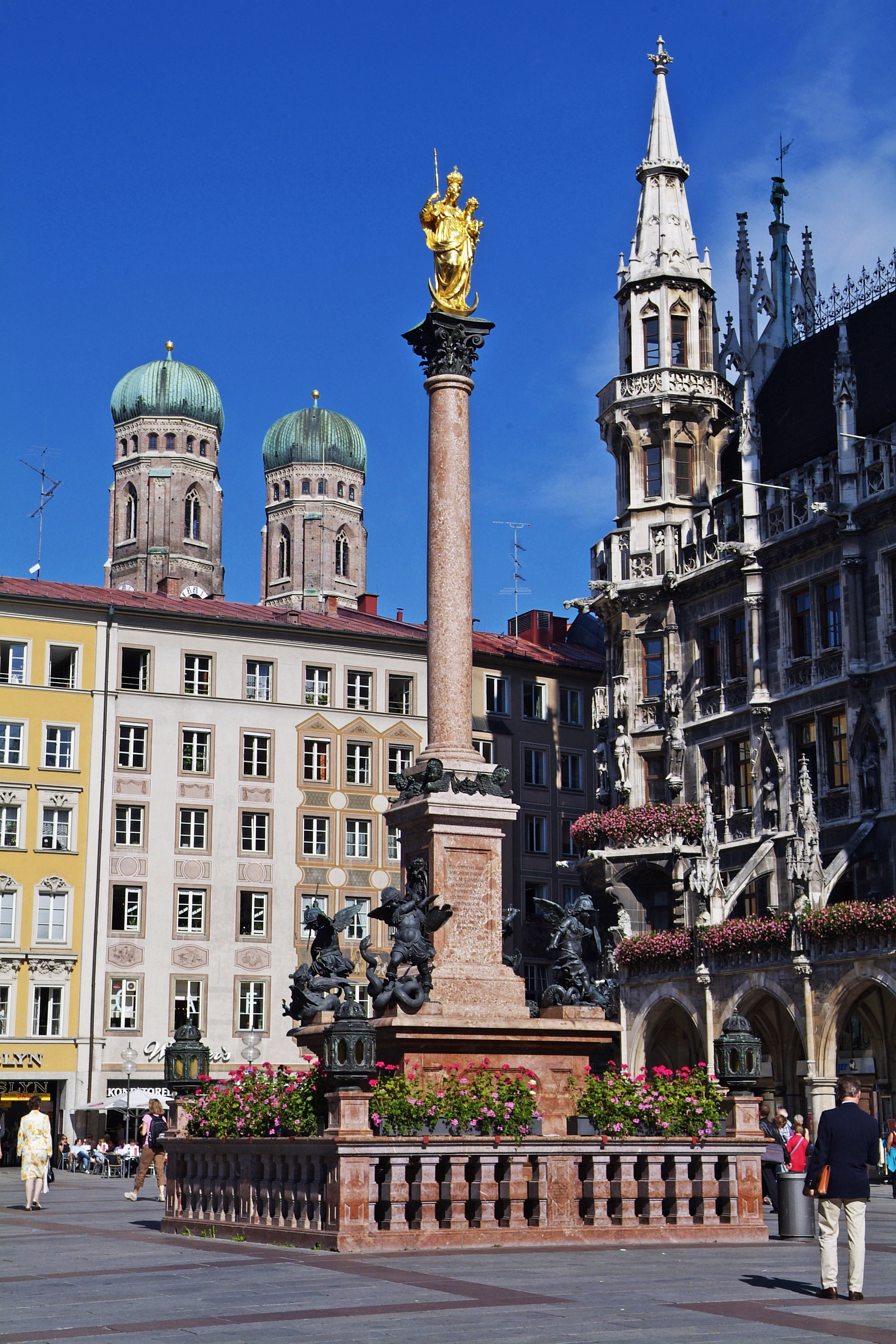
Mariensäule on Marienplatz.

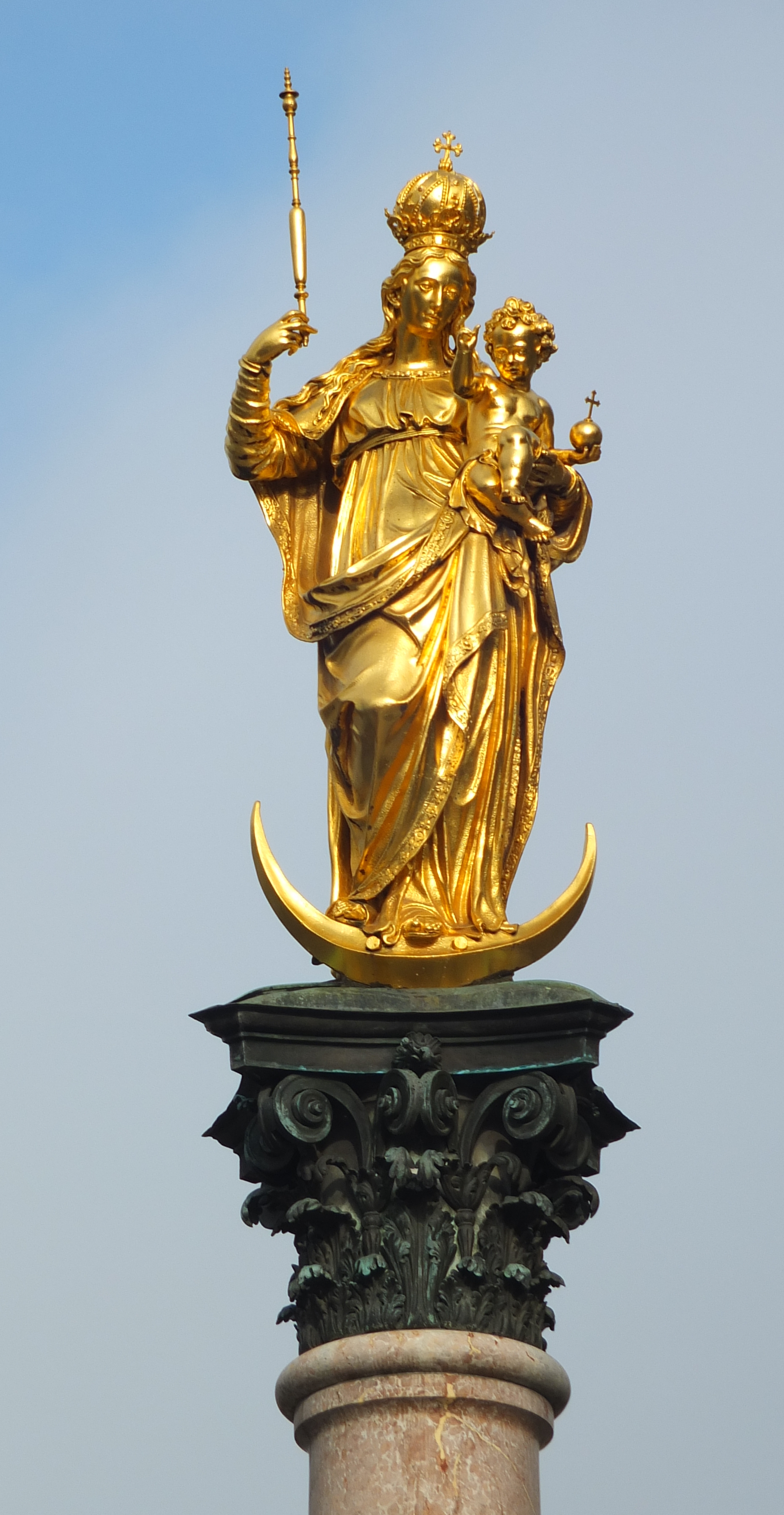
Virgin Mary atop the Mariensäule.

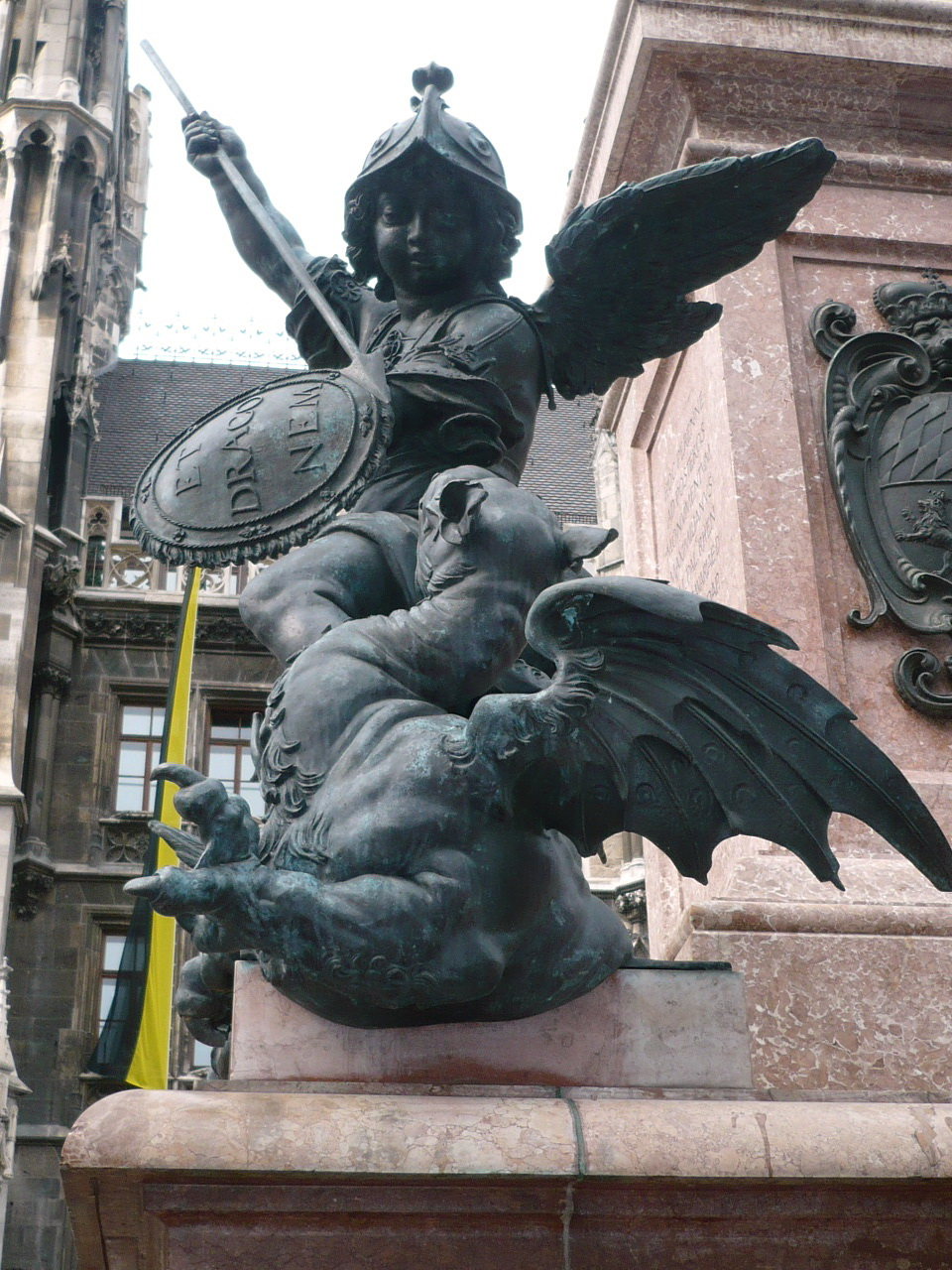
Putto fighting a dragon.

The Mariensäule (lit. 'Mary's Column') is a Marian column located on the Marienplatz in Munich, Germany. Mary is revered here as Patrona Bavariae [de] (Latin: 'Protector of Bavaria').

== History ==
It was erected in 1638 to celebrate the end of Swedish occupation during the Thirty Years' War, following a vow by Maximilian I, Elector of Bavaria if the ducal residential cities of Munich and Landshut would be spared from war destruction. The column is topped by a golden statue of the Virgin Mary standing on a crescent moon as the Queen of Heaven, created in 1590. The figure was originally located in the Frauenkirche. Mariensäule in Munich was the first column of this type built north of the Alps and inspired erecting other Marian columns in this part of Europe.

Four bronze putti were added to the base in 1639. In 2023, the column was renovated; stone surfaces were cleaned and inscriptions were rewritten.

== Features ==
At each corner of the column's pedestal is a statue of a putto, created by Ferdinand Murmann. The four putti are each depicted fighting a different beast, symbolizing the city's overcoming of adversities: war represented by the lion, pestilence by the cockatrice, hunger or famine by the dragon and heresy by the serpent.

The full inscription is as follows (with a translation)

Latin

DEO OPTIMO MAXIMO
VIRGINI DEIPARAE
BOICAE DOMINAE
BENIGNISSIMAE
PROTECTRICI
POTENTISSIMAE
OB PATRIAM
VRBES EXERCITVS
SEIPSVM DOMVM
ET SPES SVAS
SERVATAS
HOC PERENNE
AD POSTEROS
MONVMENTVM
MAXIMILIANVS
COM. PAL. RHENI
VTRIVSQVE BAVARIAE DVX
S.R.I. ARCHIDAP.
ET ELECTOR
CLIENTVM INFIMVS
GRATVS SVPPLEX
POSUIT A. MDCXXXIIX

Translation

TO GOD THE BEST AND GREATEST
AND TO THE VIRGIN, THE MOTHER OF GOD
MISTRESS OF BAVARIA
MOST BENIGN
PROTECTRESS
MOST POWERFUL;
BECAUSE THE HOMELAND
CITIES, ARMIES
HIS OWN HOUSE
AND HIS HOPES
WERE SAVED
THIS LASTING
MEMORIAL
FOR THOSE TO COME
MAXIMILIANVS
PALSGRAVE OF THE RHINE
RULER OF BOTH BAVARIAS
ARCHSTEWARD OF THE HOLY ROMAN EMPIRE
AND ELECTOR
THE WORST OF HER SERVANTS
A GRATEFUL SUPPLICANT
PUT UP IN THE YEAR 1638
