= List of clocks =

This is a list of clocks that have attained notability because of their historical importance, accuracy, exceptional artistry, architectural value, or size.

== Africa ==
=== Morocco ===
- Dar al-Magana, water clock completed in 1357
- Dar al-Muwaqqit, water clock completed in 1361

== Asia ==
=== Indonesia ===
- Jam Gadang, clock tower in the city of Bukittinggi, West Sumatra, Indonesia

=== Israel ===
- Eretz Yisrael Clock

=== Japan ===
- Cosmo Clock 21, the world's largest clock

=== Malaysia ===
- Malay College Kuala Kangsar clock tower
- Sultan Abdul Samad Building
- Jubilee Clock Tower

=== Singapore ===
- The Chinese High School Clock Tower Building
- Victoria Theatre and Concert Hall

=== Sri Lanka ===
- Old Colombo Lighthouse
- Khan Clock Tower
- Koch Memorial Clock Tower

=== Yemen ===
- Big Ben Aden

== Europe ==
=== Belarus ===
- Old and very rare pendulum clock on St. Francis Xavier Cathedral in Hrodna. Earlier, the clock was located on the town hall tower.

=== Czech Republic ===
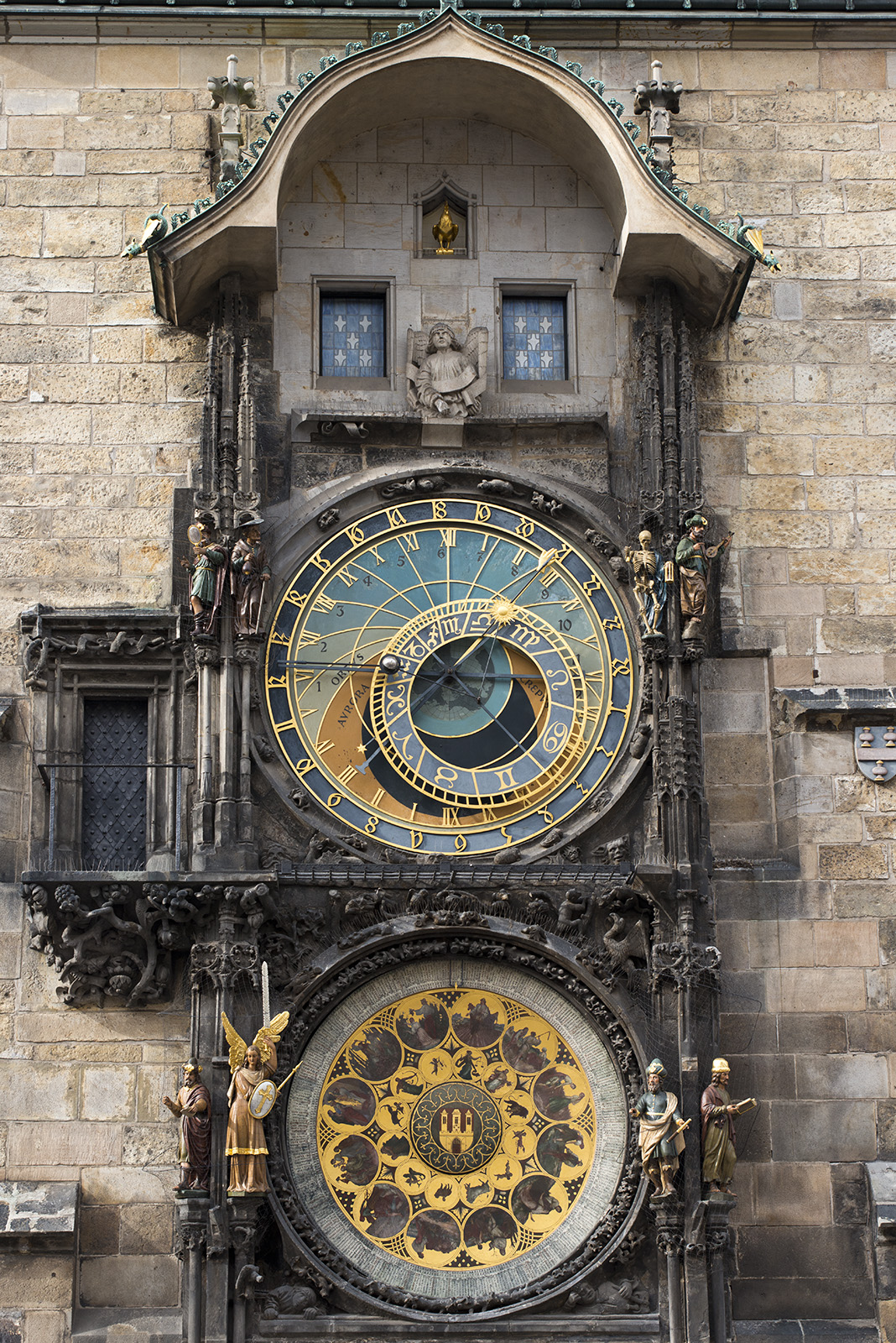
Prague astronomical clock

- Prague astronomical clock
- Brno astronomical clock
- Olomouc astronomical clock

=== Denmark ===
- Jens Olsen's World Clock

=== France ===
- The Strasbourg astronomical clock in the cathedral, completed in 1842, is one of the most complicated mechanical clocks ever made.

=== Germany ===
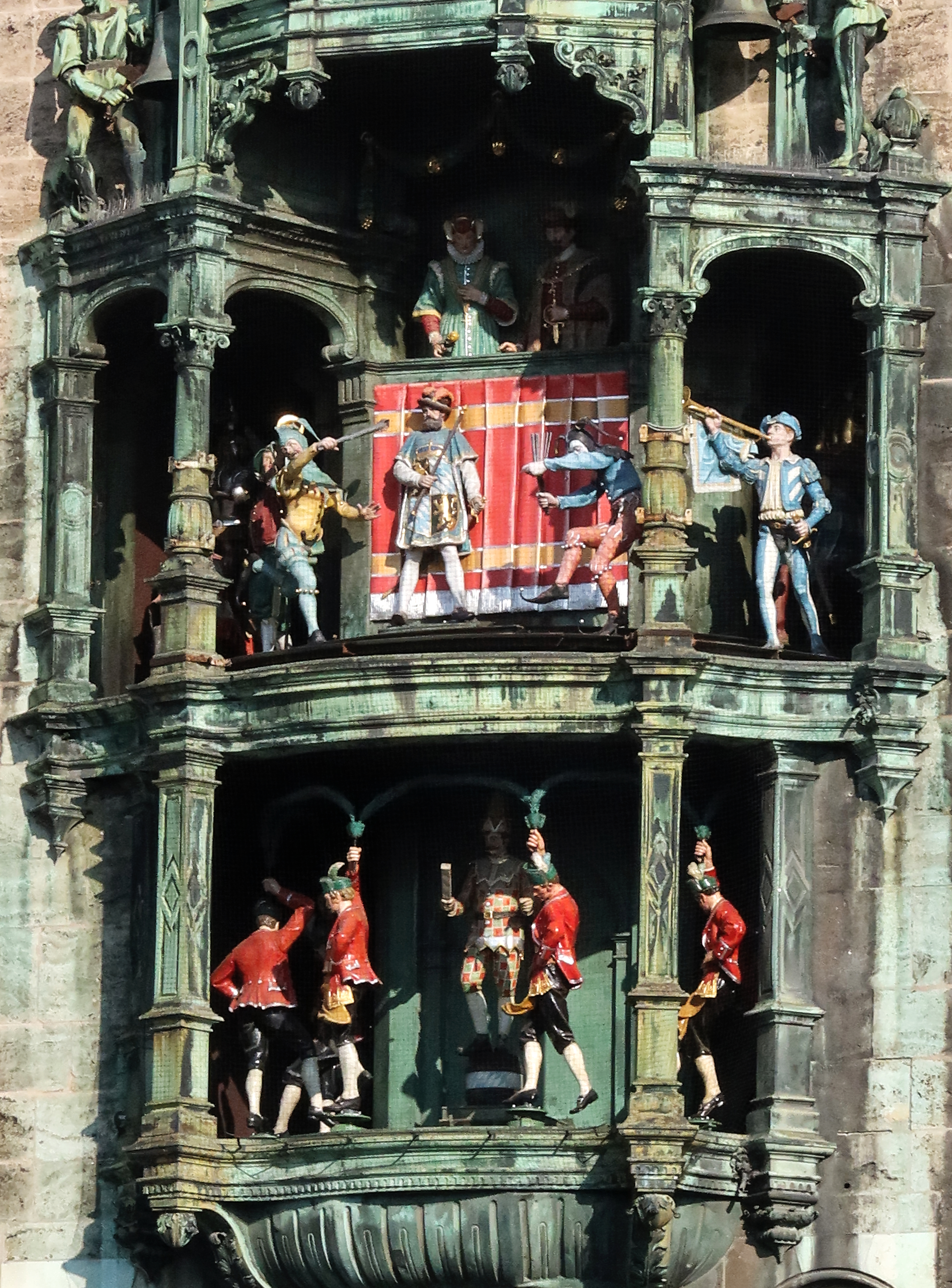
Rathaus-Glockenspiel, Munich

- In Esslingen, Germany, at the headquarters of Festo, Professor Hans Scheurenbrand has constructed the Harmonices Mundi, an astronomical clock, a world time clock, and a 74 bell glockenspiel.
- The Alexanderplatz in Berlin contains the World Time clock.
- "Die Pyramide" (German article) a skyscraper in Berlin, has what is claimed as the largest clock in Europe. It is a digital clock, with 10 metre high digits.
- The Rathaus-Glockenspiel (1908), an ornate clock located in Munich's Marienplatz, has almost life-sized moving figures that show scenes from a medieval jousting tournament as well as a performance of the Schäfflertanz ("Barrel-makers' dance").

=== Isle of Man ===
- The Jubilee clock is a street clock in the Isle of Man capital of Douglas built in 1887 as commemoration of the Golden Jubilee of Queen Victoria's reign.

=== Italy ===
- St Mark's Clock Venice

=== Poland ===
- Collegium Maius Clock, Kraków. Near the portal, on the wall, there is a clock that plays at 9:00, 11:00, 13:00, 15:00 and 17:00 the song of Jan from Lublin from the 16th century and the academic song Gaudeamus igitur. Later, the signal comes out of the figures, depicted six figures: pedal of the Jagiellonian University, Queen Jadwiga, King Władysław Jagiełło, Jan from Kęt, Hugo Kołłątaj and Stanisław from Skarbimierz. This clock is the fourth in turn and was launched in 2000.
- Town Hall Clock Tower, Poznań. Poznań Goats is one of the tourist attractions of Poznań. The mechanical goats' butting display takes place every day at 12:00 on the tower of the Poznań City Hall.

=== Russia ===
- Raketa Monumental the world's biggest mechanical clock movement, installed in the great atrium of the Detsky mir shop on Lubyanka Square in Moscow.
- Kremlin Clock, Moscow

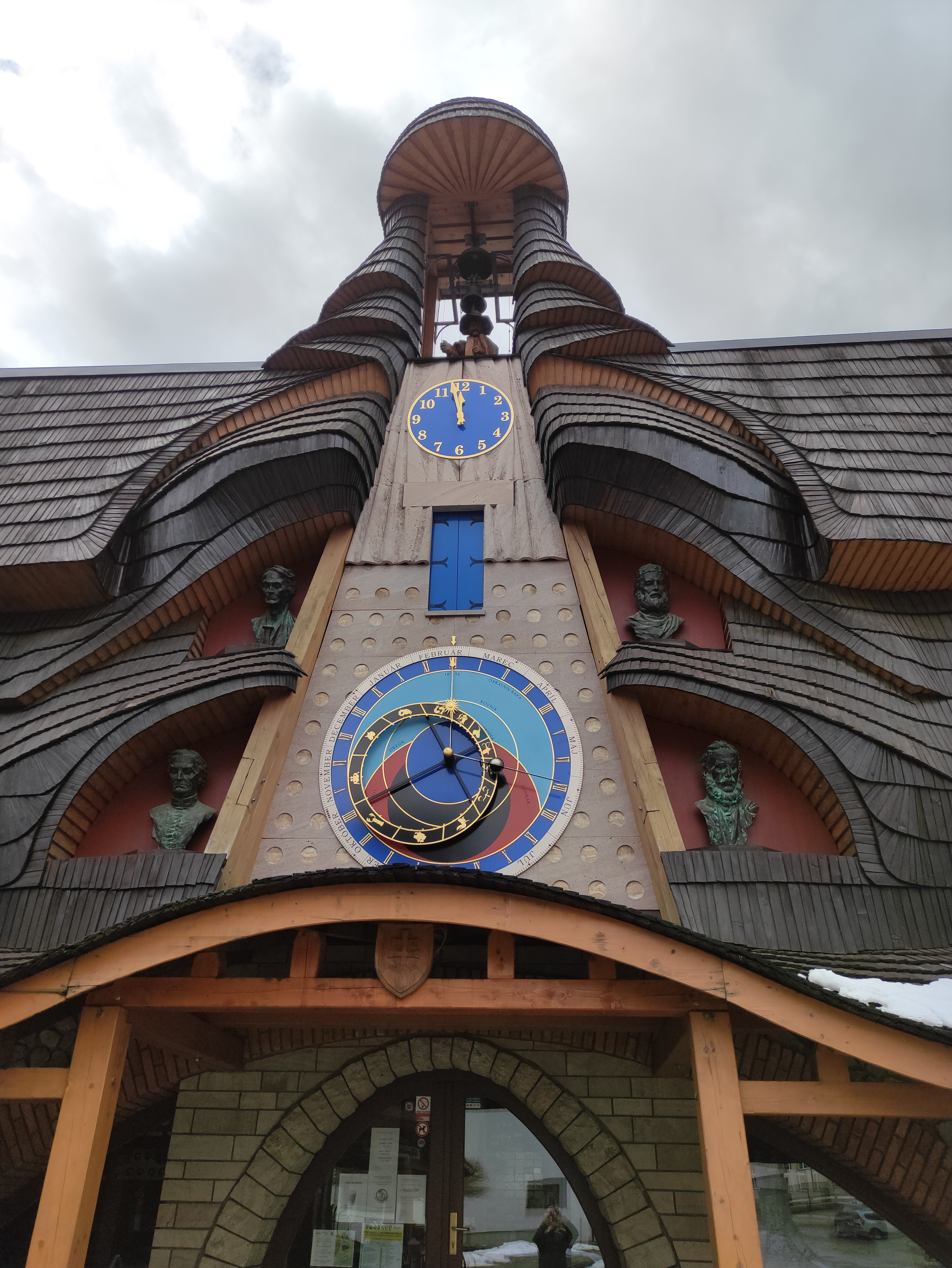
Stará Bystrica astronomical clock.

=== Slovakia ===
- Stará Bystrica astronomical clock, youngest astronomical clock in the world; the only in Slovakia.

=== Switzerland ===
- Zytglogge tower, Bern; a medieval clock tower

=== United Kingdom ===
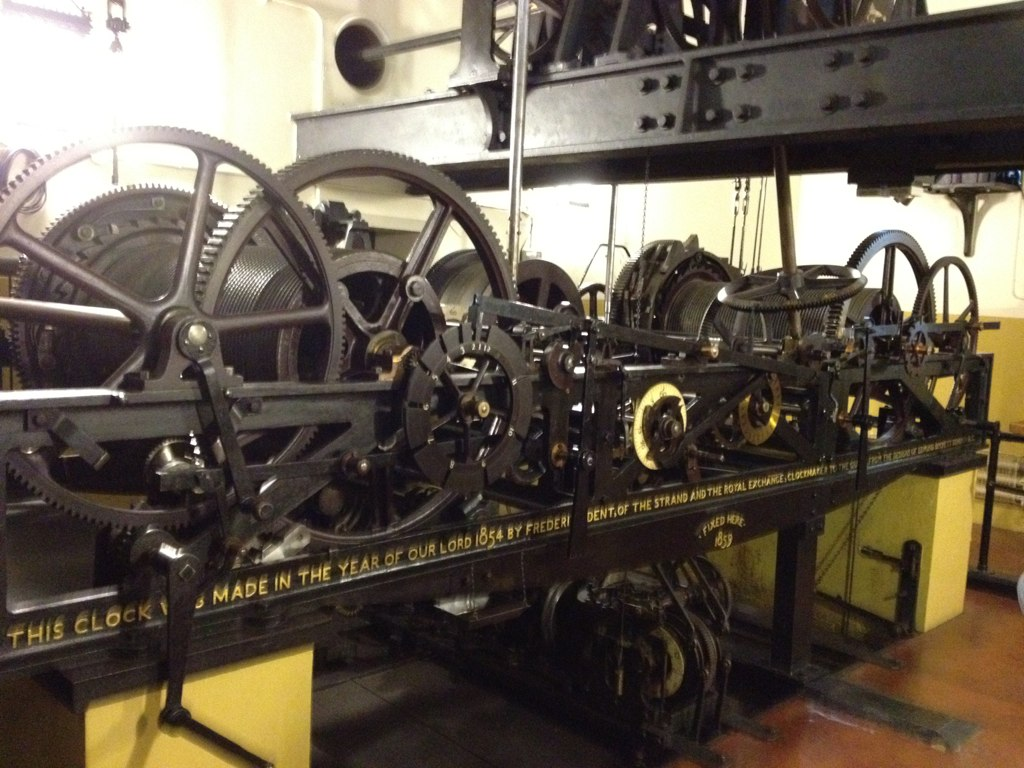
The mechanism of the Great Westminster Clock

- Big Ben, London, is England's most famous clock, and arguably the World's. 'Big Ben' is the name of the bell, rather than the clock itself, but most people associate the name with the clock, which is officially known as the 'Great Westminster Clock'.
- The Cotehele clock, the earliest known turret clock in the United Kingdom probably installed between 1493 and 1521.
- The Eastgate Clock, Chester is one of the most photographed clocks in England outside London.
- The Royal Liver Building Clock, Liverpool is Britain's largest clock face, and the largest electronically driven clocks in the UK.
- Salisbury Cathedral clock displays a model of the universe in miniature. The mechanism, dated at 1392 and still working, is in London's Science Museum.
- The Corpus Clock, Corpus Christi College, Cambridge is a 2008 public clock of novel design.
- The Liberty Clock of 1925 at the Liberty department store in Great Marlborough Street, London.
- The lighting installation at Oriel Plas Glyn y Weddw in Llanbedrog North Wales now has the largest clock. The cafe dome designed by Matthew Saunderson features 12 evenly spaced columns & arches. LED lighting either side of the arches flash on the hour to indicate the corresponding time. The cafe floor is approximately 10 metres (33 ft) in diameter. The lighting and subsequent programming was completed by Jason Jos Electrical and 3-e Smart Control.
- St Stephen's Church, Edinburgh 1828 by James Ritchie & Son, the longest clock pendulum in Europe at 60 feet (18 m) with a period of 8.6 seconds.

== North America ==
=== Canada ===
- Peace Tower, Ottawa

=== Honduras ===
- Clock of the Cathedral Immaculate cocneption, in Comayagua.

=== United States ===
- Clock of the Long Now, Colorado
- Colgate Clock, New Jersey
- The Dreger Clock, Buena Park, California is an electrically driven and regulated multi-face town clock, created in Long Beach, CA, it spent 50 years at Knott's Berry Farm and is undergoing restoration by the Buena Park Historical Society
- Jessop's Clock, San Diego, California, is a pendulum regulated multi-face town clock commissioned in 1905 by Joseph Jessop, a jewellery store owner in San Diego, California.
- The Ohio Clock is an 1815 clock in the United States Capitol
- The Town Clock of Dubuque, Iowa is in a downtown clock tower, built in 1864.
- The Clock of the Nations, Rochester, New York was located at the Midtown Plaza in the 1960s. It had dioramas of 12 different nations. Every hour on the hour the dioramas opened up and music was played. The clock was then moved to the Fredrick Douglass Greater Rochester International Airport - after a time there it was put in storage. Now it has been renovated and is on display at Tower 280 in downtown Rochester.
- The oldest continuously running clock in the United States is located in Winnsboro, South Carolina, and dates all the way back to 1837.
- Hertzberg Clock (San Antonio), Texas
- Department of Defense master clock, at United States Naval Observatory, Washington, D.C.
- Delacorte Clock, Central Park, New York City
- Baxter Clock, New Bern, North Carolina, NRHP-listed
- Copake Memorial Clock, Copake, NY, NRHP-listed
- Old Clock at Zion's First National Bank, Salt Lake City, UT, NRHP-listed
- The digital countdown clock at the Press Site-Clock and Flag Pole, Kennedy Space Center, Florida, NRHP-listed
- Sidewalk Clock at 161-11 Jamaica Avenue, New York, NY, NRHP-listed
- Sidewalk Clock at 200 5th Avenue, Manhattan, New York, NY, NRHP-listed
- Sidewalk Clock at 519 3rd Avenue, Manhattan, New York, NY, NRHP-listed
- Sidewalk Clock at 522 5th Avenue, Manhattan, New York, NY, NRHP-listed
- Sidewalk Clock at 783 5th Avenue, Manhattan, New York, NY, in front of The Sherry-Netherland, NRHP-listed
- Sidewalk Clock at 1501 3rd Avenue, Manhattan, New York, NY, NRHP-listed
- Snow Fountain and Clock, Brockton, Massachusetts, NRHP-listed
- Shot Clock Monument, Syracuse, New York

Williamsburgh Savings Bank clock, Brooklyn. For a time the largest-faced four-faced clock in the US, before being surpassed by one in Milwaukee

== Oceania ==
=== Australia ===
- Nylex Clock, Cremorne, Victoria
- Royal Clock, Queen Victoria Building, Sydney

== Other ==
- The Doomsday Clock by Bulletin of the Atomic Scientists, which symbolizes man's current risk of nuclear war
- Experimental Talking Clock, long thought to be the world's oldest playable sound recording

== See also ==
- List of largest clock faces
- List of largest cuckoo clocks
- List of clock towers
- List of tallest clock towers
