= James Sheldon Trayer =

James Sheldon (died 1939) was an officer in the United States Navy and a recipient of the Navy's second-highest decoration, the Navy Cross.

Trayer joined the Navy in around 1901 as a "landsman for training" and rose through the ranks to become a lieutenant commander by the end of his career. He served as a quartermaster on early destroyers and on the battleship USS New Jersey (BB-16) during the Great White Fleet's cruise around the world in 1909. On October 28, 1911, he commanded the first company of recruits to graduate from the Great Lakes Recruit Training Command, three months after the facility opened. Trayer continued training recruits at Great Lakes until 1914.

During World War I, he became a commissioned officer and was the commander of the tug USS Sonoma (AT-12). He was awarded the Navy Cross for many rescues during the winter of 1917–1918 in the North Atlantic, and for helping torpedoed merchant ships. His official citation reads in part: "For distinguished service ... in assisting ice-bound vessels in the winter of 1917-1918 ... and for valuable and seamanlike assistance under very difficult circumstances."

Trayer retired from the Navy in 1931 and died 8 years later.

== Namesake ==
A mock ship used for training at Great Lakes Recruit Training Command, USS Trayer (BST-21), was named in his honor.
