= Dreger =

Dreger is a surname. Notable people with the surname include:

- Alice Dreger, American historian, bioethicist and former professor of clinical medical humanities and bioethics at the Feinberg School of Medicine, Illinois
- Darren Dreger (born 1968), Canadian sportscaster

See also

- Bro-Dreger (Trégor in Breton), is one of the nine provinces of Brittany
- Dreger Clock, is a large town clock in Buena Park, Kalifornien
- Dreger Harbour, is a harbour south of Finschhafen, Papua New Guinea
