= Rathaus-Glockenspiel =

Clock in Marienplatz, Munich

Coordinates: 48.13750°N 11.57544°E

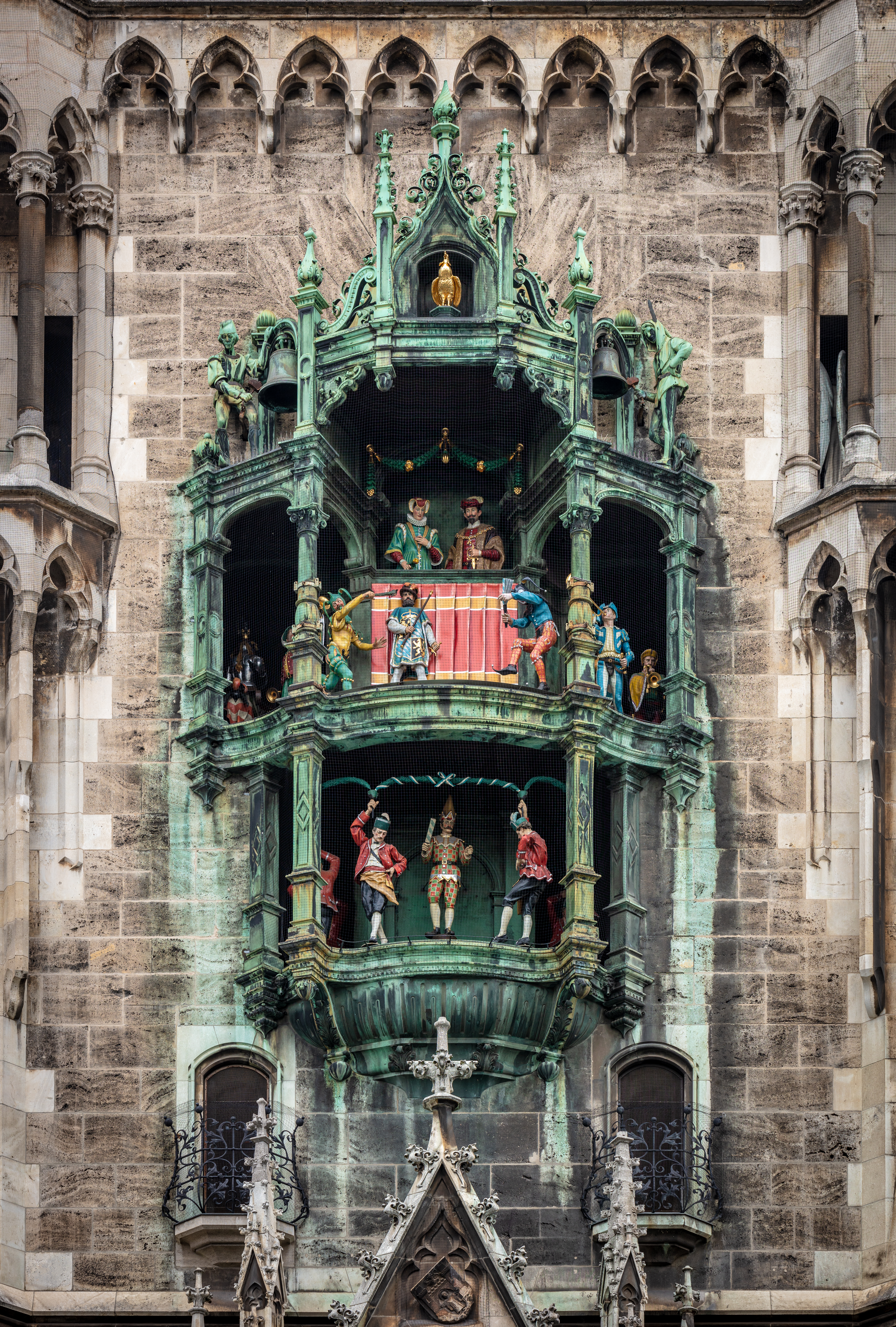
The Glockenspiel at Marienplatz

The Rathaus-Glockenspiel is a large mechanical clock located in Marienplatz Square, in the heart of Munich, Germany. Famous for its life-size characters, the clock twice daily re-enacts scenes from Munich's history. First is the story of the marriage of Duke Wilhelm V to Renata of Lorraine in 1568, followed by the story of the Schäfflertanz, also known as the coopers' dance.

== History ==
The clock, with 43 bells and 32 life-size figures, was added during the completion of the Neues Rathaus (New Town Hall) in 1908. Every day at 11 a.m. and 12 p.m. (as well as 5 p.m. from March to October) the clock re-enacts two stories from Munich’s history from the 16th century, taking about 15 minutes.

The top half of the Glockenspiel tells the story of the marriage of the local Duke Wilhelm V (who also founded the noted Hofbräuhaus) to Renata of Lorraine (Renate von Lothringen). In honor of the happy couple, there is a joust with life-sized knights on horseback representing Bavaria (in white and blue) and Lothringen (in red and white); the Bavarian knight (Bayerische Ritter) wins.

This is followed by the second story, the Schäfflertanz otherwise known as the coopers' dance, which plays out on the bottom half of the clock. This story depicts the end of a severe plague that took place in 1517. The coopers are said to have danced through the streets, encouraging residents to leave their homes again after being frightened by the plague. The coopers remained loyal to the duke, and their dance came to symbolize perseverance and loyalty to authority through difficult times. By tradition, the dance is performed in Munich every seven years. This was described in 1700 as "an age-old custom", but the current dance was defined only in 1871. The dance is performed during Fasching (German Carnival); it was performed in 2026.

At the very end of the show, a very small golden rooster at the top of the Glockenspiel chirps quietly three times, marking the end of the spectacle.

In addition to the main show, there is also a minishow. Every evening at 9 pm, a night watchman with dog and lantern makes his rounds at the town hall tower, afterwards the Munich Child is blessed by the Angel of Peace and put to bed.

== Restoration ==
In 2007 the glockenspiel underwent a restoration that was supported by the German Foundation for Monument Protection.
