= USS Sonoma (AT-12) =

Tugboat of the United States Navy

Coordinates: 10°57′N 125°2′E

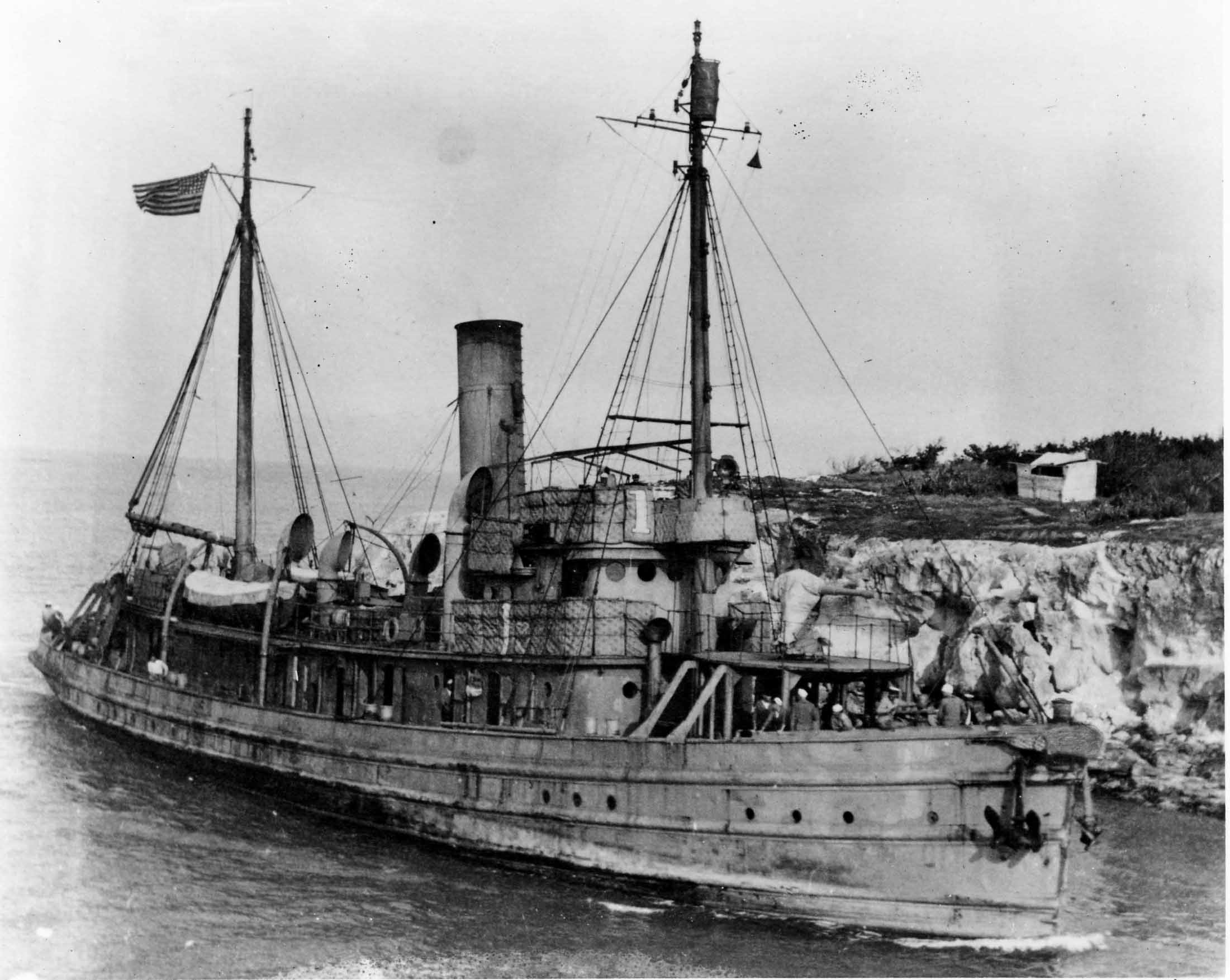

History

United States
- Name: Sonoma
- Laid down: 7 November 1911
- Launched: 11 May 1912
- Commissioned: 6 September 1912
- Stricken: 27 November 1944
- Honours and awards: 5 Battle stars
- Fate: Sunk by a crashing Japanese bomber, 24 October 1944

General characteristics
- Displacement: 1,120 long tons
- Length: 175 ft (53 m)
- Beam: 34 ft (10 m)
- Draught: 12 ft 6 in (3.81 m) (mean)
- Speed: 13 knots (24 km/h; 15 mph)
- Complement: 56

USS Sonoma (AT-12) was a Sonoma-class fleet tug operated by the United States Navy during World War I and World War II. She earned five battle stars during World War II. She ended her career when she was sunk by a crashing Japanese bomber.

The second U.S. Navy warship to be named Sonoma, the tug's keel was laid down on 7 November 1911, at Camden, New Jersey, by the New York Shipbuilding Co.. The vessel was launched on 11 May 1912 and commissioned on 6 September 1912.

== Operational history ==
=== World War I operations ===
Upon commissioning, Sonoma was assigned to the U.S. Atlantic Fleet as a tender, and she served in that capacity through World War I. In 1919, the tug was transferred to the U.S. Pacific Fleet and, on 17 July 1920, was designated AT-12. Sonoma was assigned to Train Squadron 2 of the newly organized Base Force during the winter of 1923 and 1924 and remained with the Base Force through the early years of World War II.

=== World War II Pacific Theatre operations ===
At the outbreak of war between the United States and Japan, Sonoma was in transit from Wake Island to Pearl Harbor: and, after a voyage to Canton Island and back in February and March 1942, she remained at Pearl Harbor until October, serving as a channel guard vessel. At that time, she departed Pearl Harbor in company with the destroyer Ellet and auxiliary Turkey to tow ARD-2 and YO-24 to New Caledonia. The group arrived at Noumea on 3 November and, after two weeks of repairs and upkeep, Sonoma sailed for Sydney, Australia, with Alhena in tow. She returned to Nouméa on 6 December and stayed there until 2 January 1943. On that date, she put to sea to aid damaged United States Army workboat P-111 to limp into port. She and her charge made Nouméa on 5 January.

For the next eight months, Sonoma towed ships between the ports of the South Pacific Ocean. Based at Noumea, New Caledonia, she visited the Fiji Islands, the New Hebrides Islands, Australia, and New Guinea, both at Milne Bay and Buna. On 3 September 1943, she arrived off Lae, New Guinea, to participate in her first combat operation and, in the afternoon, was straddled by four bombs-near misses-and sprayed by shrapnel during a raid by seven Japanese twin-engine bombers. Later on, she cleared the area for Morobe Bay. Sonoma's scrapes with Japanese air power continued through the month of September as she operated in the vicinity of Lae. She came under attack on 12, 21, and 22 September and assisted in shooting down one Japanese aircraft on 12 September. For the remainder of 1943, she operated in and around Buna Harbor. On the second day of 1944, she got underway for Saidor, New Guinea. Her formation came under automatic weapons fire on the following day and Sonoma was hit by several .50 caliber machine gun bullets. The fire had come from friendly shore batteries which mistook the ships for Japanese barges known to be operating in the vicinity. The echelon made Dreger Harbor on 15 January; then headed on to Milne Bay. From there, Sonoma towed APC-4 to Brisbane, Australia, arriving on 1 February. Following overhaul and repairs, she got underway on 15 February to return to Milne Bay. After spending most of March 1944 around Milne Bay, she headed for Manus in the Admiralty Islands on 31 March.

For the next three months, Sonoma supported General Douglas MacArthur's “leapfrog” operation up the back of the New Guinea bird. On 15 May 1944, Sonoma was redesignated ATO-12 and, later that month, she moved to the Hollandia area in the vicinity of Biak Island, where she did salvage, fire fighting, and towing duty for the landing craft which had been bombed and strafed by the Japanese. She spent the month of June in Humboldt Bay, New Guinea, then lent her support to the Noemfoor attack during the first week in July. By 15 July, she was back at Milne Bay for repair and upkeep.

On 11 September, she got underway for the assault area off Morotai Island in the Netherlands East Indies. She remained there for 10 days-again providing salvage, fire fighting, and towing services. During that period, she suffered a broken crankshaft and had to put in at Gila Bay for repairs. On 21 September, she sailed back to Humboldt Bay where she went into availability for a week; then resumed salvage duty around Jautefa Bay. On 14 October, she sailed in company with echelon LI, as Task Unit 78.2.9, bound ultimately for the Leyte invasion. Sonoma entered San Pedro Bay, Leyte Gulf, on 20 October. On the morning of 24 October, she opened fire on several Japanese planes with her starboard guns.

=== Japanese aircraft collision and loss ===
As she cast off from merchant freighter SS Augustus Thomas, next to whom she had been moored, a flaming Japanese bomber crashed into Sonoma on the starboard side amidships. Two explosions followed immediately, and she began taking water at an alarming rate. LCI-72, LCI-337 and Chickasaw came alongside the stricken tug, extinguished the fires on her starboard side, and removed casualties. Chickasaw then made an unsuccessful attempt to beach her on Dio Island. Later in the afternoon, Sonoma sank in 18 feet (5.5 m) of water off Dio Island. Her name was struck from the Navy list on 27 November 1944.

== Military awards and honors ==
- World War I Victory Medal
- American Defense Service Medal
- Asiatic-Pacific Campaign Medal with five battle stars
- World War II Victory Medal
