= Eretz Yisrael Clock =

An Eretz Yisrael Clock (also Eretz HaKodesh Clock) is a clock which is reset to 12:00 at sundown every day. It was used by the Old Yishuv and is still used by certain groups in the Meah Shearim, and Geula neighborhoods of Jerusalem; as well as in Ramat Beit Shemesh and Safed.

The system of time keeping is based on that used in the Ottoman Empire at the time the Ashkenazi Old Yishuv arrived from Europe at the end of the 18th century and beginning of the 19th century.
