= Hertzberg Clock (San Antonio) =

Freestanding clock in San Antonio, Texas

Coordinates: 29°25′36″N 98°29′29″W

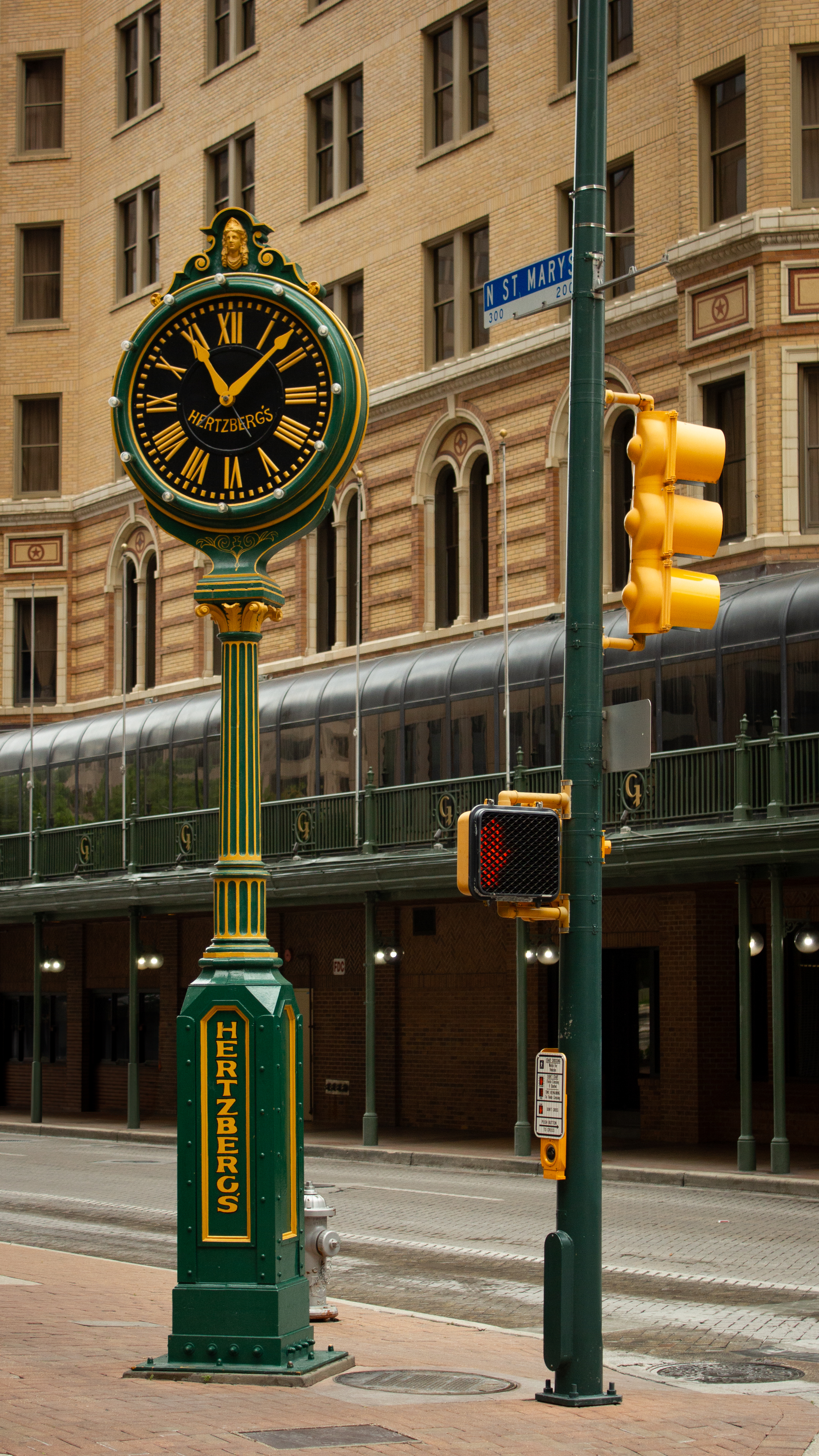
The Hertzberg Clock

The Hertzberg Clock is a historic landmark and visitor attraction located at the corner of N. St. Mary's and Houston streets in the Bexar County city of San Antonio in the U.S. state of Texas. Installed in 1878 in front of Eli Hertzberg Jewelry Company, it was made by E. Howard & Co. of Boston, Massachusetts. The freestanding town clock was donated to the San Antonio Conservation Society in 1982 by the daughters of its original owners, Max and Nell Goodman. A 1985 restoration was made possible through donations of time and money from Republicbank San Antonio, John J. Duff, master watchmaker and clockmaker, London Watch and Clock Company; and Kurt, Ted, and Al Voss, Kurt Voss Metals, Inc. The clock is hand wound and maintains time through a series of weights.
