= E. Howard & Co. =

American clock and watch company

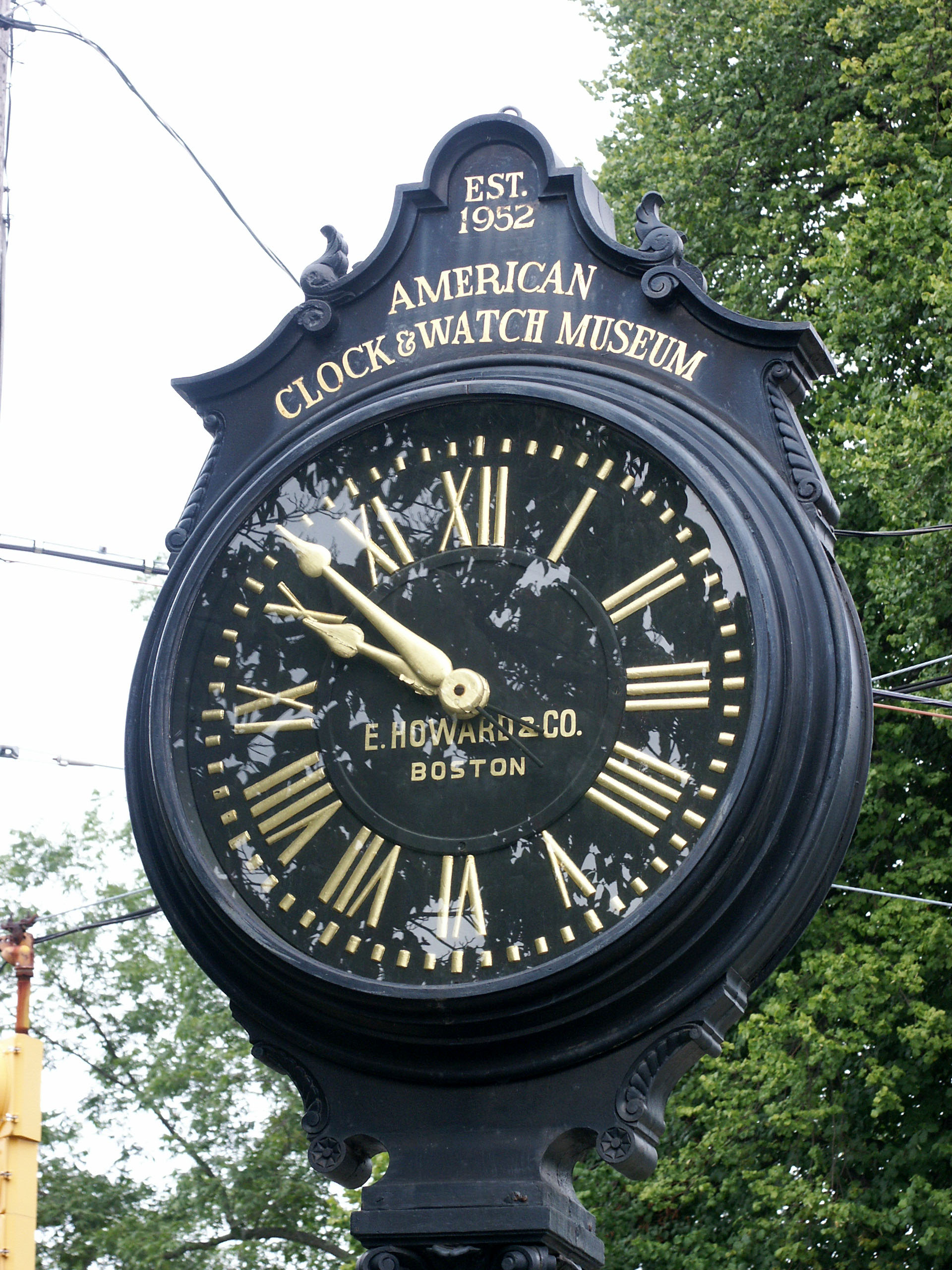
- Street clock by E. Howard & Co.
- Industry: Watchmaking and clockmaking
- Predecessor: Boston Watch Company
- Founded: 1858; 168 years ago
- Founders: Edward Howard and Charles Rice
- Defunct: 1881
- Successor: E. Howard Watch Clock Company
- Headquarters: Roxbury, Massachusetts, United States
- Products: Watches, regulators, marine clocks

E. Howard & Co. was a clock and watch company founded in 1858 by Edward Howard and Charles Rice after the demise of the Boston Watch Company. The pair acquired some of the material and watches in progress through a lien held by Rice against the defunct company. However, they were unable to purchase the existing factory or machinery, prompting their relocation to Roxbury. Soon afterwards, Howard bought out Rice's share, continuing the company independently with a focus on producing high quality watches based on his own unique designs and eccentric production methods. E. Howard & Co. also produced regulators, and marine clocks.

In 1881, Edward Howard retired and sold his interest in the business. On December 1, 1881, the E. Howard Watch & Clock Company was established as a joint stock corporation to succeed the earlier firm.

== Early history ==
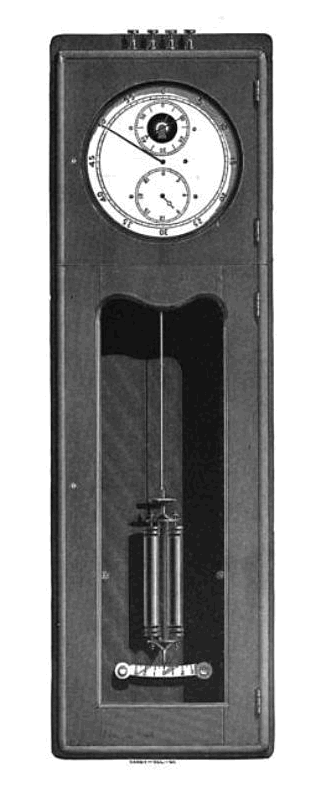
Precision astronomical regulator (1887)

Howard was a clockmaking apprentice of Aaron Willard Jr. and commenced business with David P. Davis, manufacturing high-grade wall clocks under the name of Howard & Davis in 1842. They also became known for their manufacture of sewing machines, fire engines and precision balances. About 1843, with a third partner, Luther Stephenson, they began to also manufacture tower clocks.

In 1857, David P. Davis left the firm and Howard & Davis was dissolved. In 1857–8, Edward Howard finished and sold left over "Model 1857" material from the Boston Watch Co. under the name Howard & Rice. In December 1858, Howard bought out Rice's interest and began manufacturing watches of a new design, signed "E. Howard & Co." While the company name changed several times during the firm's watchmaking history, all watches it made continued to be signed "E. Howard & Co." throughout, with only minor exceptions. The Howard firm established itself as a leading American manufacturer of luxury watches from 1858 into the 1890s.

On March 24, 1861, the clock and watch businesses were combined into one joint stock corporation, the Howard Clock & Watch Company, which failed in 1863. Thereafter, Howard formed a new company called the Howard Watch & Clock Company (transposing clock & watch) on October 1, 1863, which was successful for some years but was reorganized in 1881 after financial setbacks of a few years previous.

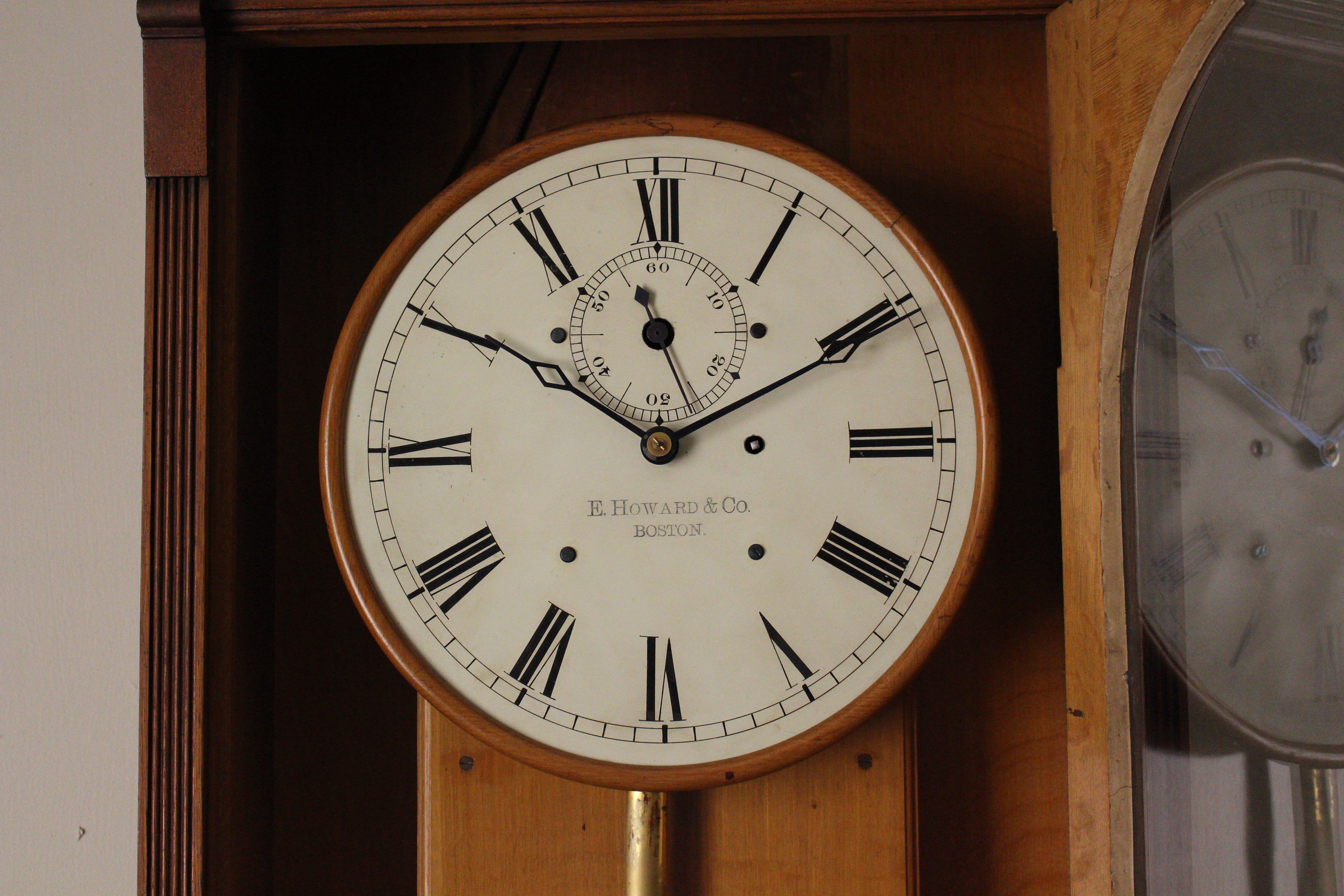
#89 Regulator (1895)

In 1882, Edward Howard sold out his personal interests and retired, leaving the firm to new management. This firm continued the manufacture of many clock styles, primarily weight driven wall timepieces and regulators of fine quality. Only two common wall models, #5 and # 10, were produced as stock items, all others being manufactured by special order.

Regular watch making operations ceased in 1903, when the Howard name in association with watches was sold to the Keystone Watch Case Co. Keystone purchased the defunct US Watch Co. factory building in Waltham, Massachusetts (The US Watch Co. of Waltham is not to be confused with an earlier company of the same name in Marion, New Jersey.) Keystone manufactured watches at the location signed "E. Howard Watch Co." These watches were of new designs and unlike those of the original Howard company. Clocks were manufactured at Roxbury, a section of Boston, but in the early 1930s those operations were also moved to Waltham, Massachusetts. A very small number of pre-existing Howard watches were finished in the Howard clock factory between 1903 and 1927.

== Howard Clock Products ==
A new firm known as Howard Clock Products was formed November 5, 1934, to succeed the earlier firm. Clock production was on the wane, but precision gear cutting business kept the firm profitable, particularly from government contract work. Production of smaller clocks ceased in 1957 or 1958 and the last tower clock was produced in 1964.

In 1975, Dana J. Blackwell, as a new Vice President of the firm, revived clock production, reintroducing several of the more popular models to the market. Movements in these later clocks maintained the high standards the Howard firm had become famous for and cases were made to very strict specifications.

The older owners of the firm sold the business to a young, seemingly successful businessman in August 1977. He eventually fired most of the firm's knowledgeable management and proceeded to drain it financially. By 1980, when the firm was at the verge of bankruptcy, the new manager was caught attempting to burn down the factory building. After a lengthy trial he was convicted, though never served any time in jail.

At the time of the arrest, the Federal Government stepped in and the Howard firm was placed under Chapter 11 bankruptcy protection. A manager was brought in by the bankruptcy court and after creditors were satisfied, the firm sold the clockmaking portion of the business to private investors who continue to offer Howard clocks.

== Timeline ==
- 1842 E. Howard Clock Co. founded
- 1845 Howard Clock factory built in Roxbury
- 1850 American Horologue Company founded by E. Howard and A. L. Dennison, with financial backing from D. P. Davis
- 1853 The first production watches completed, signed "Warren Manufacturing Co.," which evolved into the Waltham "Model 1857," the first successful industrially manufactured watch.
- 1854 The Warren Mfg. Co. (previously, the American Horologue Co.) is renamed the Boston Watch Co.
- 1857 Boston Watch Co. fails; Royal E. Robbins and partners purchase the machinery and most of the inventory, but Edward Howard teams with lienholder Chas. Rice to remove about 500 watches in progress to Roxbury; Both Robbins and Howard claim succession from the Boston Watch Co.
- 1857-8 Howard finishes left over Boston Watch Co. Model 1857 material under the name "Howard & Rice"
- 1858 Howard buys out Rice and the name of the watchmaking operation is changed to E. Howard & Co.
- 1858 Production of "E. Howard & Co." watches begins based on Reed's divided plate 6-pillar design
- 1861 Howard Watch and Clock Co. incorporated
- 1862 3/4 plate watch production begins at Howard
- 1863 Company reorganized
- 1869 Howard introduces new steel safety barrel on watches with pendant winding and setting
- 1873 New plant completed
- 1879 Waltham Watch and Tool Co founded (U.S. Watch)
- 1881 Company reorganized as E. Howard Watch and Clock Co.
- 1882 Edward Howard retires
- 1898 E. Howard Watch & Clock Co. fails
- 1899 Manufacture of new watch parts suspended; Thereafter, watch movements were assembled and finished from existing part stocks
- 1900 E. Howard Clock Co. emerges from reorganized company
- 1902 E. Howard Watch Co. incorporated (shares Boston business address with E.H.C.Co.)
- 1902–1904 E. Howard Clock Co./Watch Co. receive movements made for them by the American Waltham Watch Co.
- 1903 Regular watchmaking activities at E. Howard & Co. cease as E. Howard Watch Co. name purchased by Keystone Watch Case Co. and re-incorporated
- 1903 U.S. Watch Co. sold to E. Howard Watch Co. (owned by the Keystone Watch Case Company)
- 1903–1923 A very small number of pre-existing E. Howard & Co. watches are finished and put out by the Howard Clock Co.
- 1903–1927 The E. Howard Watch Co. of Waltham, Massachusetts (a.k.a., "Keystone Howard") manufactures watches of their own updated designs.
- 1904 Edward Howard dies
- 1904–1905 Keystone/EHWCo receive movements made for them by the American Waltham Watch Co.
- 1905–1927 The E. Howard Watch Co. of Waltham, Massachusetts (a.k.a., "Keystone Howard") manufactures watches of their own updated designs
- 1927 Howard name sold to Hamilton Watch Co.
- 1927 Howard Clock Co. buys U.S. Watch factory from Keystone
- 1931 Hamilton buys goodwill and trademarks of the E.Howard Watch Co.
- 1933 Howard Clock Products Co. incorporated
- 1933 to Present Howard Clock Products Co. manufactures clock and timer mechanisms
- 1939 Hamilton finishes one dozen pocket watches marked E. Howard Watch Co., based on Hamilton's grade 917 movement
- 1942, 1946-49 Hamilton produces a little over 1000 wristwatches marked E. Howard Watch Co., based on Hamilton's grade 980 movement
- 1994 to Present, The La Crosse Clock Company purchased E. Howard & Co.
- 2012, EHWC, Inc. begins development to manufacture high-end wrist watches in Boston.
- 2013 A new world record was set on Saturday, November 23 at Fontaine's Auction Gallery in Pittsfield, Ma. when an E. Howard No. 68 Astronomical Regulator clock was sold for $277,300.00 making it the highest price ever paid at auction for a clock by E. Howard & Co.
- Howard, Davis & Dennison serial number 3, the third of seventeen experimental 8-day watch movements with tandem mainsprings made circa 1851, sold in its original gold case at Jones & Horan Auction House on June 2, 2019, for $300,000. Howard, Davis & Dennison movement serial number 1, which was Edward Howard's personal watch, is in the collection of the Smithsonian American History Museum.

== List of notable clocks created by E. Howard & Co. ==
- Boston FIRE ALARM Office, Fire Alarm Emergency, 59 Fenway, Boston, MA 02115 ( https://www.cityofboston.gov/fire/ )
- Elkhart County Courthouse, Elkhart, Ind. Installed in 1870, remains in operation as of 2024.
- Trinity Episcopal Church (Williamsport, Pennsylvania) First tower clock (Serial Number 281) in the United States of America to sound the "Cambridge Quarters" (popularly known as the Westminster Chime or Westminster Quarters.) Installed 1875 in the church steeple. Electrified in the 1940s by E. Howard.
- Courthouse Clock in the Maverick County Courthouse in Eagle Pass, Texas.
- Administration Building clock, Tewksbury Hospital, Tewksbury, Massachusetts.
- Clock Tower Building (Former New York Life Insurance Company Building), 346 Broadway, New York, New York.
- Ferry Building, San Francisco, California
- King Street Station, Seattle, Washington
- Saline County courthouse clock, Harrisburg, Illinois
- Sioux County courthouse clock, Orange City, Iowa. Built in 1902.
- Wrigley Building, Chicago, Illinois
- Unitarian Church originally, now at the Whaling Museum, Nantucket, Massachusetts
- First United Methodist Church of Westfield, New Jersey. The clock mechanism (Serial Number 1141 or 1111) controls the two tower clock faces and a 2,048 lb. church bell that rings hourly, made by the Clinton H. Meneely Bell Company, of Troy, New York. Both date from 1886 and were moved from an earlier wooden church building. After not working since the 1930s, the clock was restored and rededicated on January 8, 1994, and continues in operation to this day. The clock mechanism is still manually wound weekly, while the bell striker is wound by an electric motor installed in the late 1990s.
- Haverhill tower clock at Walnut Square School, Haverhill, Massachusetts
- Hertzberg Clock in Texas, maintained by the San Antonio Conservation Society
- Saint Stephen Evangelical Lutheran Church of Milwaukee, Milwaukee, Wisconsin Still manually wound weekly.
- Lamoille County Courthouse in Hyde Park, Vermont Installed in 1911.
- Thayer Academy Clock Tower, Braintree, Massachusetts Thayer Academy
- Atkinson County Courthouse Pearson, Ga. Installed 1920
- Colorado Springs Pioneers Museum, Colorado Springs, CO, street clock dating to 1900.
- Courthouse clock & bell in the Red River County Courthouse in Clarksville, Texas, 1885 - the bell still rings out the hour today
- In 1904 the tower clock, manufactured by E. Howard Clock Company, was installed in the cupola of the Eureka, Illinois courthouse in Woodford County.
- Sapporo Clock Tower, installed in 1881, still alive
- Hardy's - The Art of Jewelry - Virginia Beach, Virginia. Commissioned in 1884 by D. Buchanan Jewelry in Richmond, Virginia. Moved several times as the family owned jewelry business grew. The clock survived the famous 1918 Monticello Hotel fire. Donated to New Approach School for Jewelers (Arrington, TN) in June, 2022.
- Village Green Clock, Main Street in Bar Harbor, Maine.
- North Conway Depot and Railroad Yard Still in use, now home to Conway Scenic Railroad
- Benton County Courthouse Clock Tower, Corvallis, Oregon Still in use. The weights and pendulum remain in the building but the clock is no longer mechanically wound.
- Lick Observatory time-signal clock with electric apparatus for transmitting the time signal over telegraph lines.
- 342 West Broadway, South Boston Ward 4, Precinct 6 is a designated landmark by the Boston Landmarks Commission, Study Report.
- 439 Boylston Street, Boston Ward 5, Precinct 6 is a designated landmark by the Boston Landmarks Commission, Study Report.
- 333 Massachusetts Avenue, Boston Ward 4, Precinct 7 is a designated landmark by the Boston Landmarks Commission, Study Report.
- 9 Chelsea Street, East Boston Ward 1, Precinct 3 is a designated landmark by the Boston Landmarks Commission, Study Report.
- Peabody Square, Ashmont Ward 17, Precinct 9 is a designated landmark by the Boston Landmarks Commission, Study Report.
- Colman Dock, Seattle, Washington
- Wise County Courthouse, Decatur, Texas. Installed 1896.
- Oxford Memorial Town Hall Clock Tower, Oxford, Massachusetts
- Clallam County Courthouse Clock Tower, Port Angeles, Washington. The clock itself was made in 1880 by the Howard Tower Clock Company of Boston and was sent to Seattle in 1885 where it remained unclaimed until the architect of the courthouse secured it for installation in the new building in 1914. The clock faces are set behind frosted glass and measure 100 inches in diameter. The Roman numerals measure 15 inches tall, the minute hand Is 46 and one-half inches long, and the hour hand is 31 and one-half inches long. Inside the cupola, the iron bell is four feet tall and weighs 2,000 pounds.
- Procter & Gamble manufacturing site in St. Bernard, Ohio. The old executive office clock tower is visible from Spring Grove Ave, the building which connects the Crisco manufacturing site to the now closed St. Bernard Soap Company manufacturing site.
