= Brno astronomical clock =

Monument in Brno, Czech Republic

Coordinates: 49°11′41.24″N 16°36′30.88″E

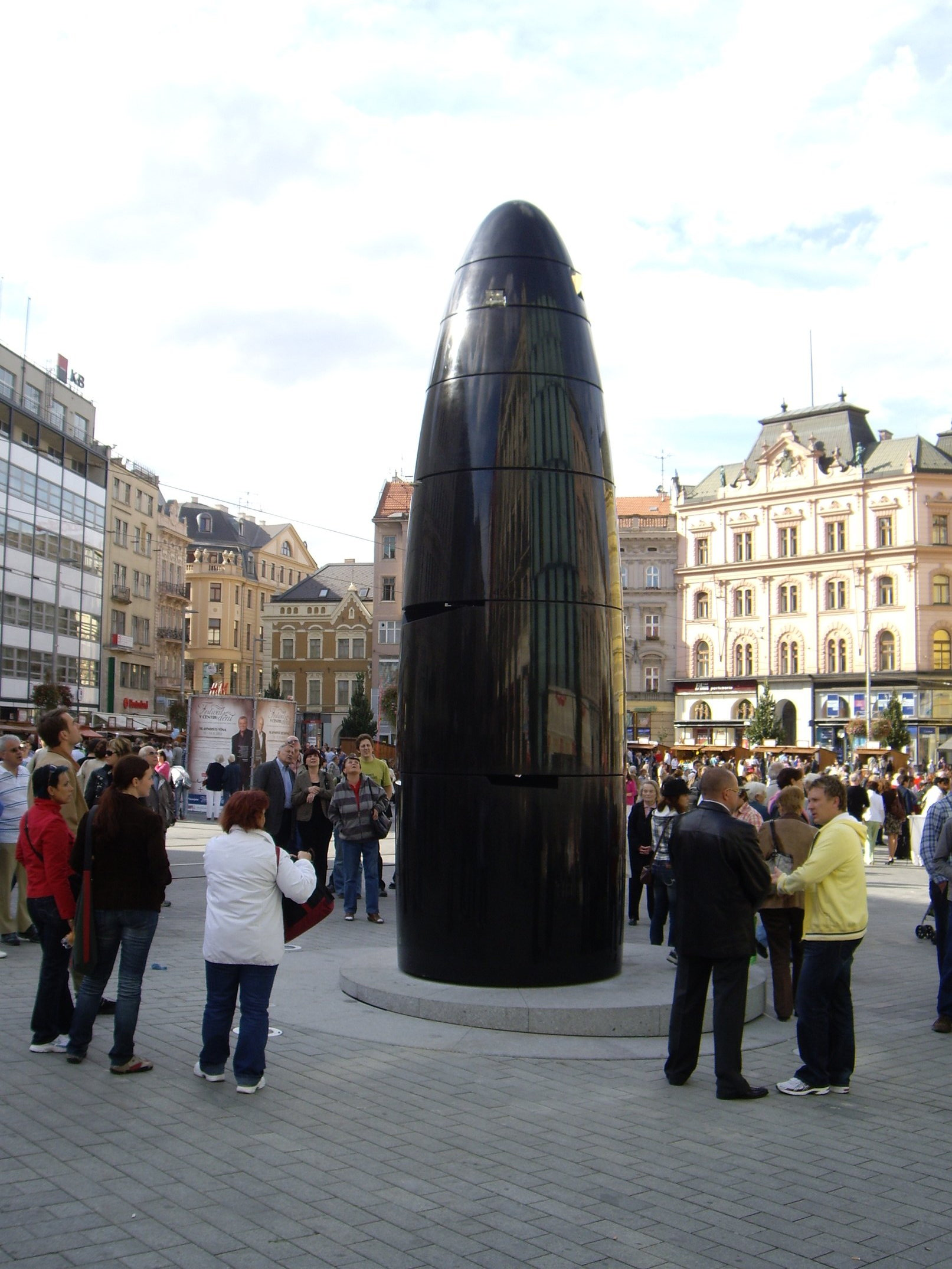
Brno astronomical clock

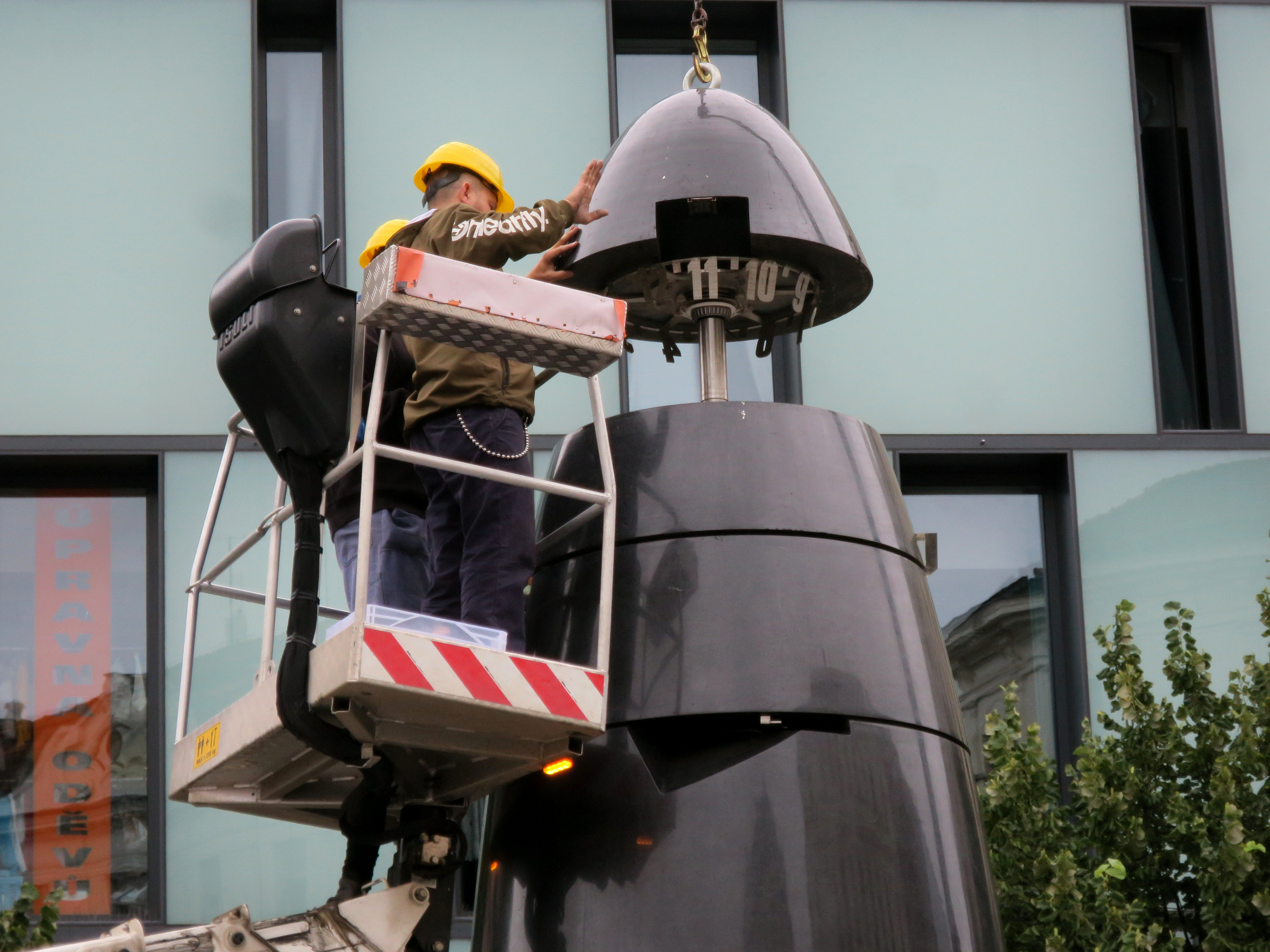
Brno astronomical clock being serviced in 2020

The Brno astronomical clock (Czech: Brněnský orloj) is a black stone monument in Brno, Czech Republic. It is situated at Náměstí Svobody, the main square in the Brno City Centre. The monument was proposed by the mayor of Brno, Roman Onderka, and it was created by Oldřich Rujbr and Petr Kameník. Every day at 11:00 AM, the clock releases a glass marble, which spectators can catch from one of four openings in the monument and take with them as a souvenir. The clock was unveiled on September 18, 2010, for the 365th anniversary of Brno's resistance to the Swedish siege during the Thirty Years War. Although the monument is publicly known as an astronomical clock (orloj), it is only a clock. Construction of the clock took three years, at a cost of approximately 12 million CZK.

While in media the monument is usually called the astronomical clock or Brno astronomical clock, it has a reputation for its phallic appearance. Officially, it is known as a clockwork machine (hodinový stroj).
