= Schäfflertanz =

Bavarian dance of the coopers

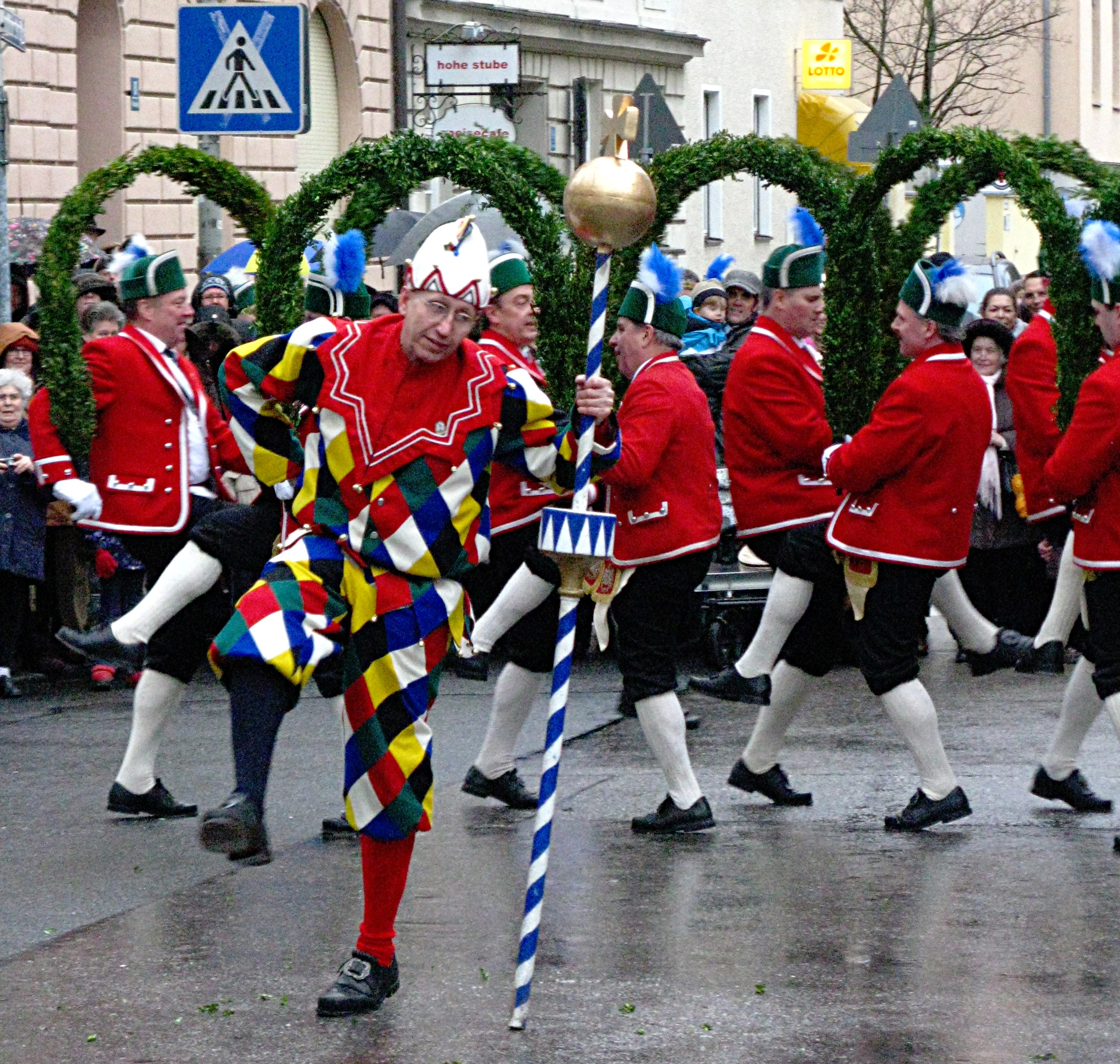
Schäfflertanz in Neuhausen, 2012

The Coopers' Dance (German: Schäfflertanz) is a guild dance of coopers originally started in Munich. Since early 1800s the custom spread via journeymen and it is now a common tradition over the Old Bavaria region. The dance was supposed to be held every seven years.

== History ==
Early documented cases of Schäfflertanz are dated by 1702 when the Münich magistrate approved the performance of the dance as a well-established tradition. However, for a long time the date 1517 was prevalent in the literature, following the 1830 book Der Schäffler-tanz in Münchhen by Anton Baumgartner, who originated the discredited legend that the tradition started after the 1517 plague, to revive the spirits of the people, "to lure them out of their houses", although other authors tried to suggest other dates. But there are no records in chronicles about any plague in Münich at this period of time. Still, the 500th anniversary was celebrated in 2017.

There is no clear indication of the origin of the seven-year cycle.

== Dance and music ==
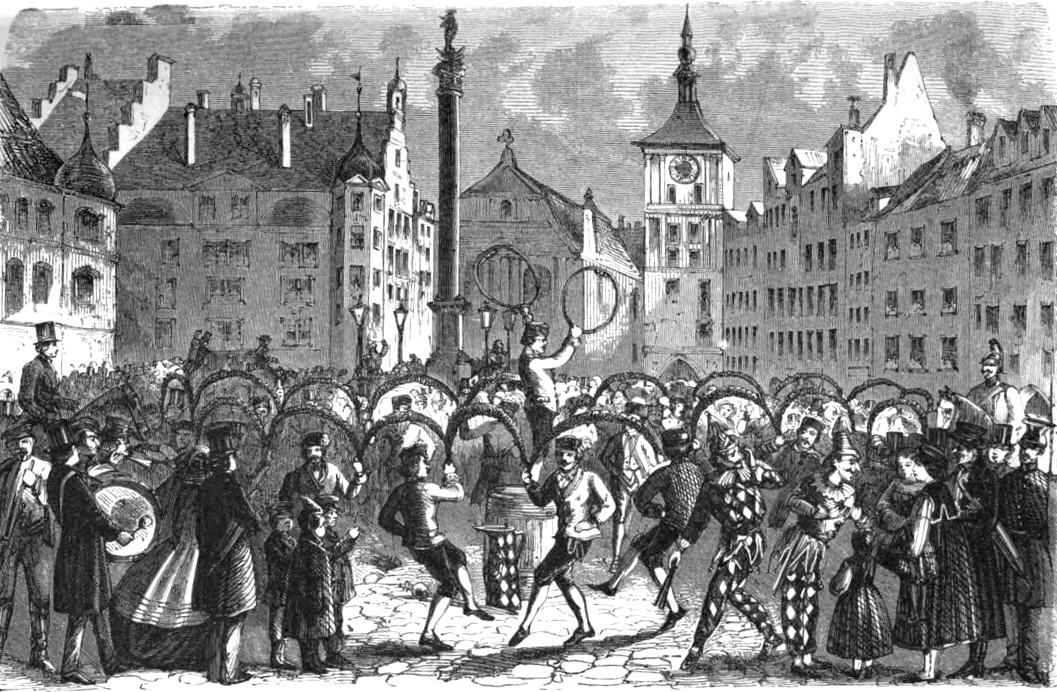
Schäfflertanz in Münich (1863); hoop spinner in the middle

The choreography of the dance was standardized in the 19th century.

After marching in various formations and performing standard figures, the final number is the barrel hoop swinging. The hoop swinger holds two hoops with shots of schnapps on the inside. The idea is to swing the hoops in intricate ways without spilling the schnapps (relying on the centrifugal force).

Of other traditions of the dance, only the costume survived: white shirt, white waistcoat, red jacket, leather apron, knee breeches, sash, brogue shoes and, a green cap adorned with down feathers.

The author of the current standard tune (the so-called the Second or New Münich Schäfflertanz, 1866) is Johann Wilhelm Siebenkäs (1826-1888). The First or Old Münich Schäfflertanz (no longer used) was by Peter Streck.
