= Dreger Clock =

Town clock in Buena Park, California, US

Coordinates: 33°51′51″N 117°59′54″W

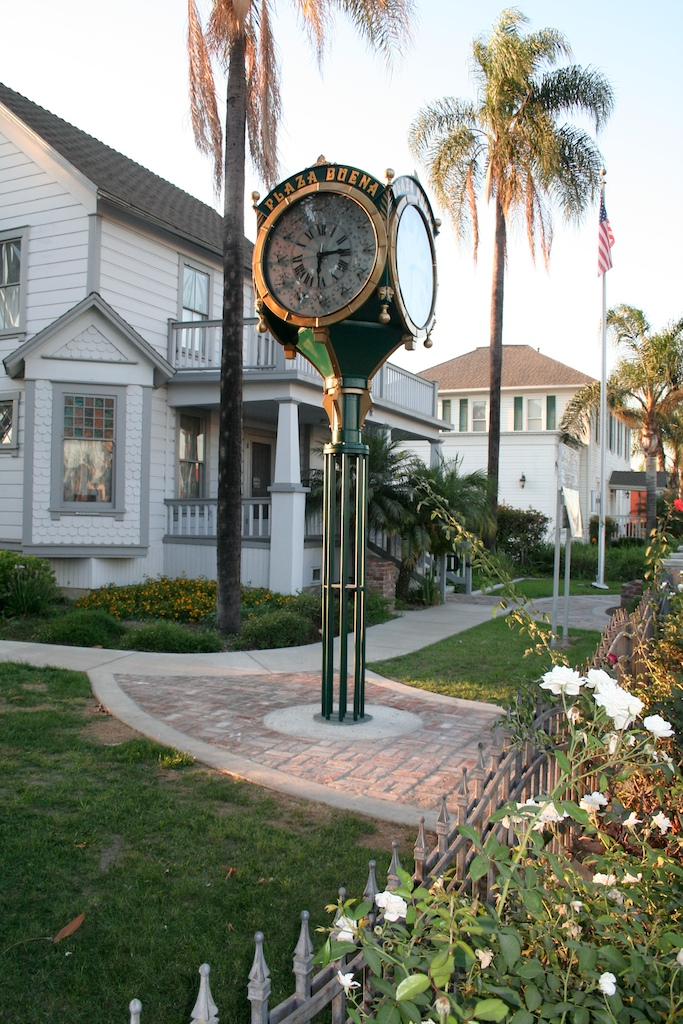
The Restored Dreger Clock in 2009

The Dreger Clock in 1998

The Dreger Clock is a large town clock with 19 different dials and displays which tell the local (California) time, the time in 12 international cities (New York, Liverpool, Paris, Berlin, Saint Petersburg, Melbourne, Rio de Janeiro, Buenos Aires, Hong Kong, Tokyo, Rome and Mexico City), the phase of the moon, the date and the day of the week. It was built between 1928 and 1933 by Andrew Dreger, Sr., a German immigrant to the United States, who was a blacksmith and watchmaker. The clock stood in front of his home in Long Beach, California for almost 20 years, until his death. It was then moved to Knott's Berry Farm in Buena Park, California, where it remained for over 50 years. The clock underwent restoration during 2008 and 2009 and on September 25, 2009, the clock was installed in the Buena Park Historical District in front of the Whitaker-Jaynes house.

== Clock's maker and early history ==
The Dreger Clock was built by Andrew Dreger Sr., whose family were pioneers to the early settlements of Anaheim, Long Beach and Buena Park. Andrew developed many mechanical skills during his life. He repaired bicycles and mechanical items, he worked with metal as a blacksmith and other jobs requiring mechanical and hand crafting skills. Toward the latter years of his life he took up watch and clock repair. Soon he became fascinated with the idea of building a large electrically powered clock that could tell the time in major cities around the world.

He first built a pendulum powered indoor clock with multiple clock faces. Immediately after completing it he started on the much larger, town clock version that would be electrically powered. It took him 5 years to build his masterpiece. When finished he placed it outside his home on Anaheim Street in Long Beach and for almost 20 years he kept it in working order.

== Unusual internal movement ==
Internal mechanism of the Dreger Clock

Inside the international face

Inside the date and phase of the moon face

The Dreger Clock has a number of unusual characteristics in regard to its internal movements. First of all, the clock is powered and regulated by a simple 110 V electrical motor. There is no pendulum in the clock, as there is in other large street clocks such as the Jessop's Clock. The movement of the clock is simple yet effective. Mechanical power is distributed to each clock face from the central location of the motor, and geared down and transferred to the various displays on the clock's three display faces. The international face of the clock uses what amounts to a bicycle chain drive to transfer mechanical power to each of the smaller international city clocks.

Another unusual feature of this clock is that originally, Andrew Dreger Sr. set it to display the solar time of the international cities rather than the, by then accepted, time zone times. This means the minute hands of the international cities were not always pointing to the same minute. In 1933 when the Dreger Clock was completed, the time zone standard was well established, however solar time was the setting used, as seen in early photos of the clock in some of the historical articles about the clock. When the clock was moved to Knott's Berry Farm in 1952-53, the clock faces were adjusted to the time zone standard, where all minute hands are in agreement, and only the hour hands are different.

== Restoration Project ==
In 2007 the Dreger Clock was purchased by the Buena Park Historical Society and an extensive restoration effort began. The clock is undergoing complete dis-assembly, cleaning, painting and repair. The "date & phase of the moon" face was found to be badly cracked, so a new hand-painted face was created to replace the original. The original face is now on display in the city's history museum, the Whitaker-Jaynes house. Some of the decorative exterior wood was found to have severe water damage and was replaced with machined aluminum replica parts, and re-painted. The mechanism of the clock is in very good shape considering that the clock is over 75 years old. cleaning and a few minor part replacements were all that was needed to get the clock running properly again. A new stand post was designed and set in the Buena Park Historical District near the Whitaker-Jaynes house facing Beach Boulevard (SR 39). This location became the new home for the Dreger Clock on September 25, 2009. The dedication event for the restoration of the clock was held on Saturday, October 3, 2009.
