= Aderklaaer Straße station =

Vienna U-Bahn station

Aderklaaer Straße
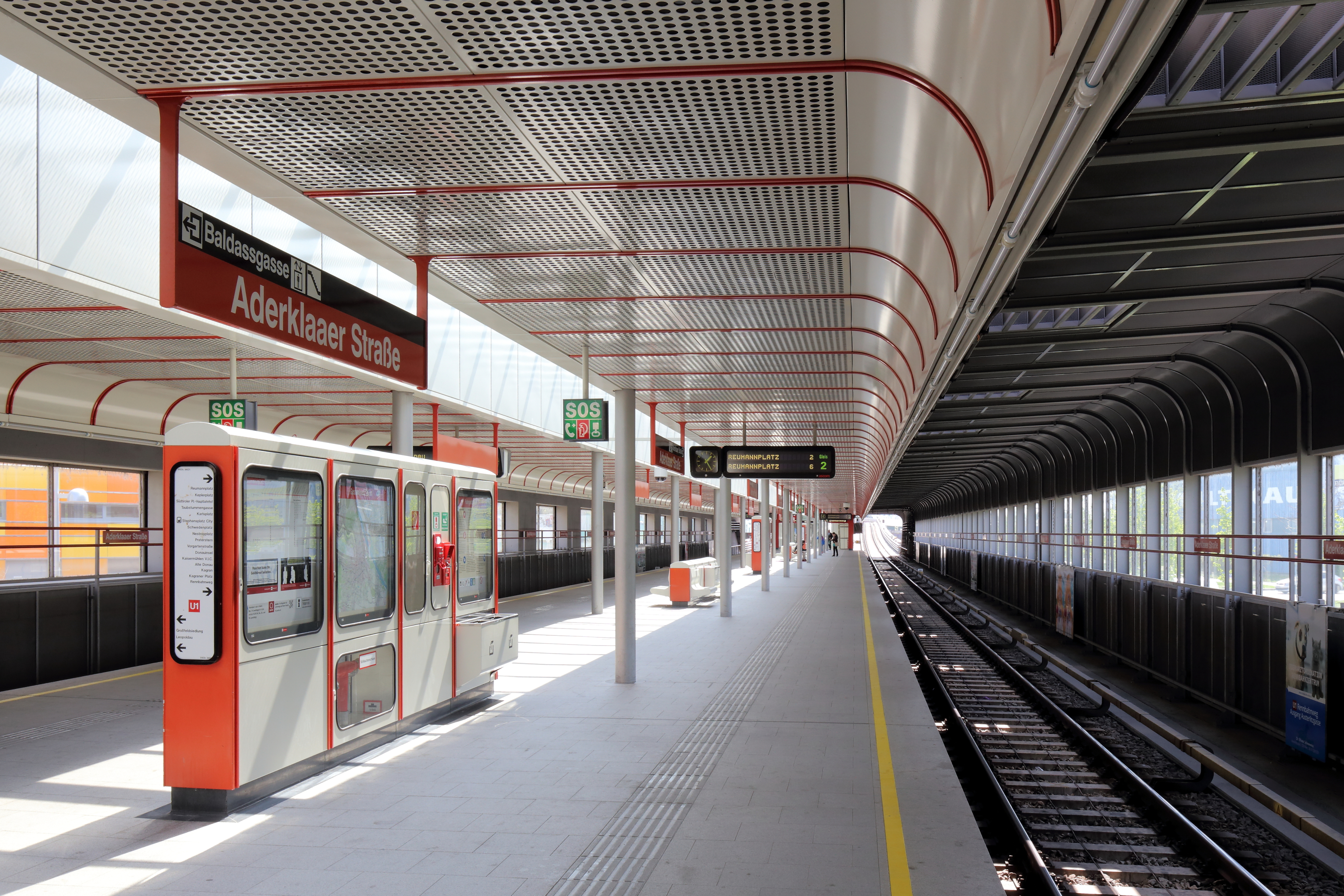

General information
- Location: Floridsdorf, Vienna; Austria
- Coordinates: 48.2634°N 16.4516°E
- Line: P+R

History
- Opened: 2 September 2006

Services
Preceding station	Wiener Linien	Following station
Rennbahnweg toward Oberlaa	U1	Großfeldsiedlung toward Leopoldau
Location

Aderklaaer Straße is a station on U1 of the Vienna U-Bahn. It is located in the Floridsdorf District. It opened in 2006.
