= Donau Zentrum =

Westfield Donau Zentrum
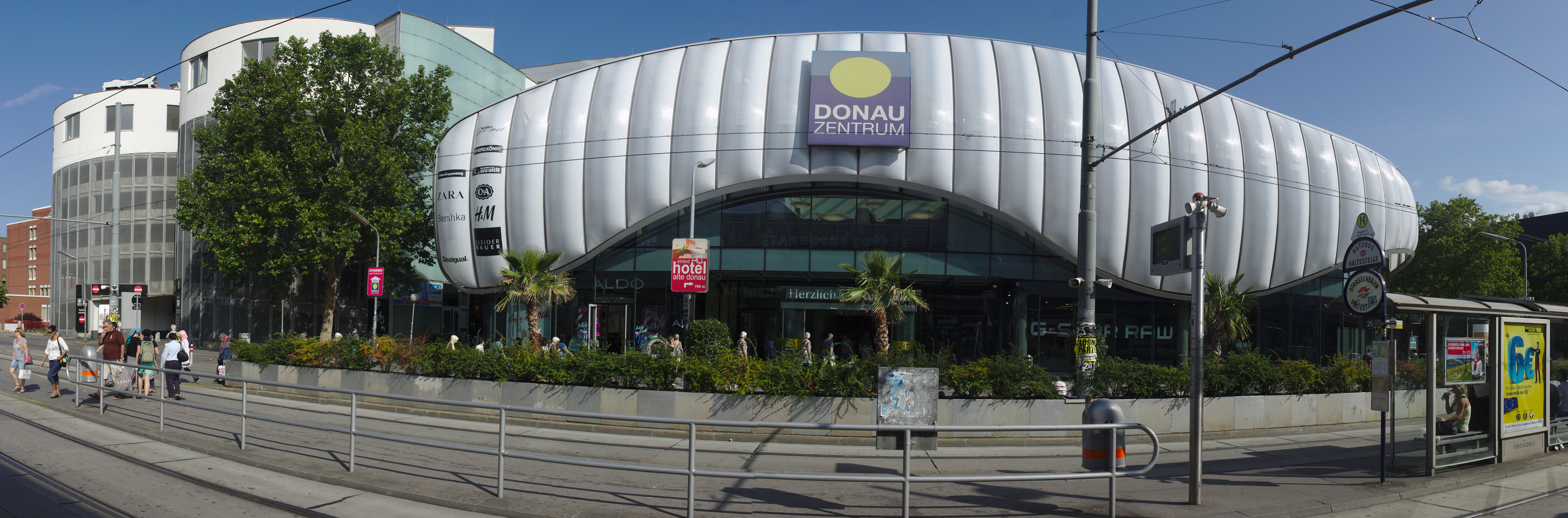
- Donau Zentrum after the renovation
- Location: Vienna, Austria
- Coordinates: 48°14′35″N 16°26′05″E
- Opened: 1975, 2010 (Expansion)
- Owner: Unibail-Rodamco-Westfield
- Num. of stores: Around 260
- Floor area: Around 133,000 square metres (1,430,000 sq ft)
- Parking: Around 3000
- Public transit: Subway: U1/Kagran; Tram: Line 25; Omnibus: 22A, 26A, 27A, 93A, 94A
- Website: www.westfield.com/en/austria/donauzentrum

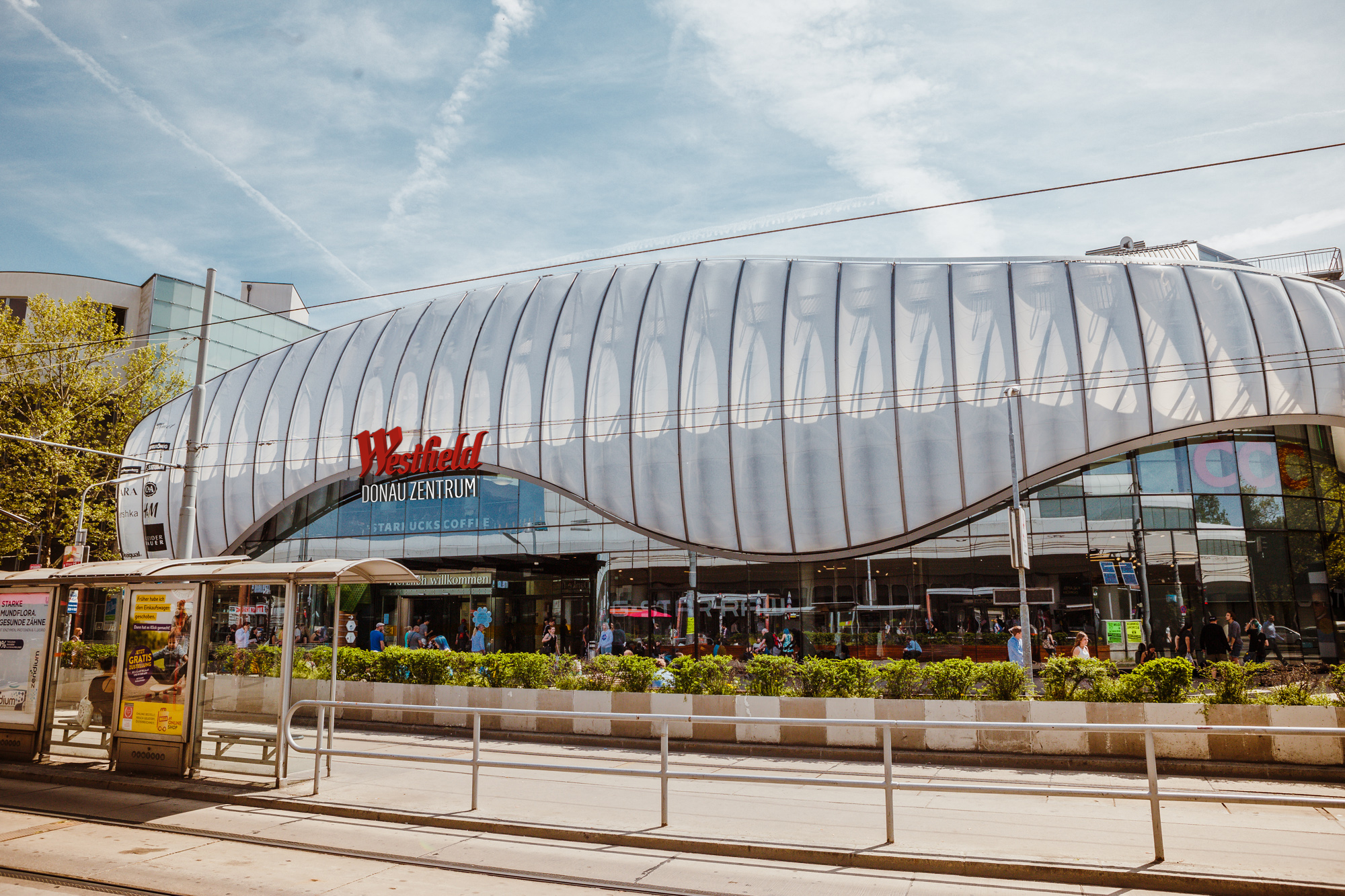
Westfield Donau Zentrum after the renaming

The Westfield Donau Zentrum (Donau Zentrum until 2021; DZ for short) is a shopping center in Vienna's 22nd district, Donaustadt. With the Kitchen restaurant area connected to the center, it is the largest shopping center and entertainment center in Vienna.

== History ==
The shopping center was opened in 1975 with 22,800 m^{2} (245,000 sq ft); today's sales area is 100,750 m^{2} (1,084,500 sq ft). There are over 262 retail, catering and entertainment establishments on a total area of approximately 225,000 m^{2} (2,420,000 sq ft) (between the center and the Kitchen). The center has been expanded several times since 1975. From 2009 to October 2010 it was expanded and rebuilt. In autumn 2021, the center changed its former name “Donau Zentrum” to Westfield Donau Zentrum. In September 2021, Unibail-Rodamco-Westfield named six locations in four European markets as Westfield Destinations.

The new building, opened in October 2010, contains over 60 new shops and, at 28,000 m^{2} (300,000 sq ft), provides a third of the additional retail space. The 38-metre-high sculpture Sonnenstrahl, which opened in mid-October 2010, is intended to complement the water drop depiction on the outer wall of the southern part of the center. The front of the center opposite the Kagran U-Bahn station has been covered with LED panels, allowing the entire headboard to change color.

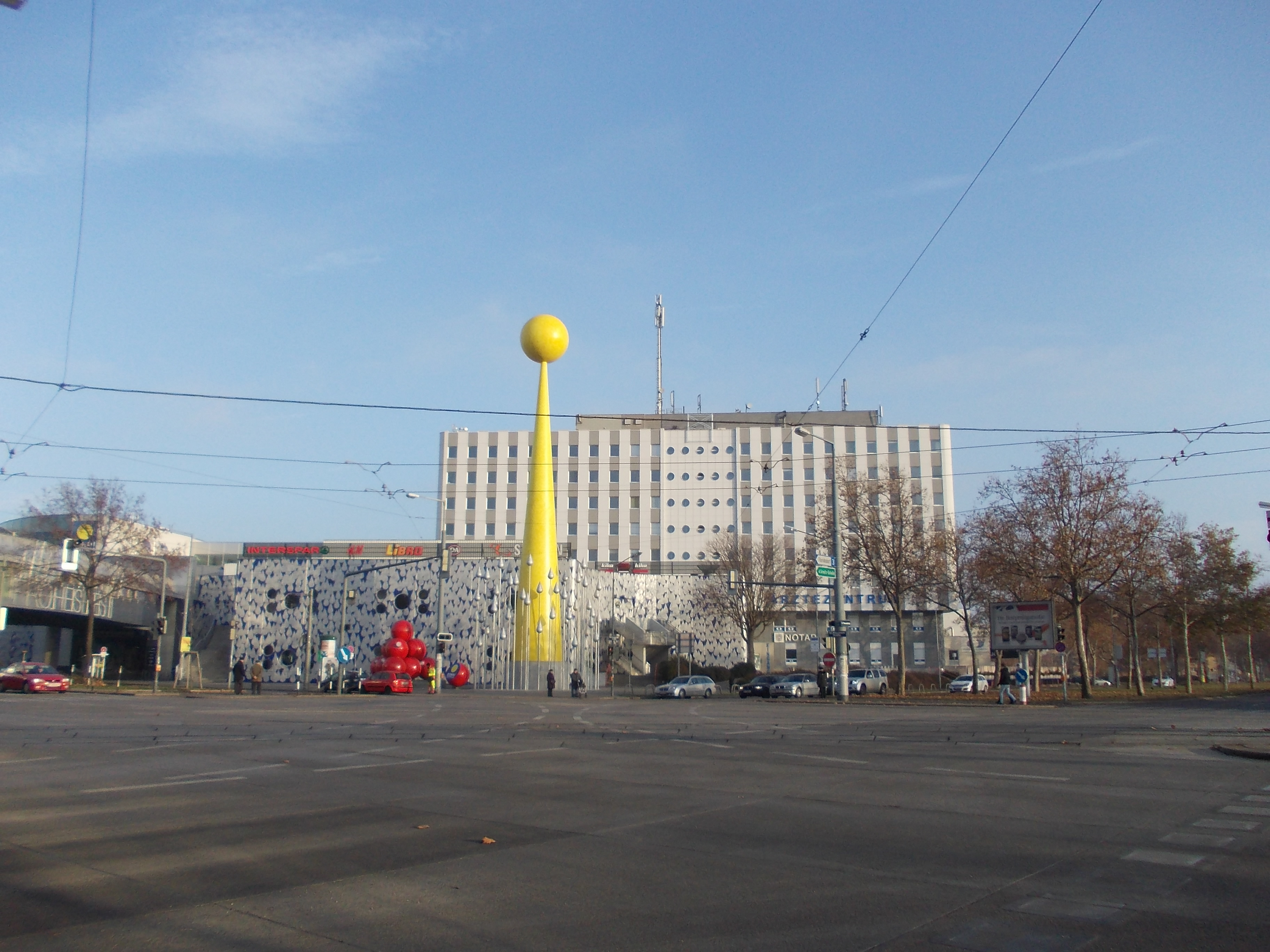
Westfield Donau Zentrum (right) with sculptures and newly renovated medical center

Unibail-Rodamco-Westfield invested around 105 million euros in the expansion of the shopping center, and a further 45 million went into the modernization of the existing shopping center.

The architectural design of the new center was created by the London-based firm Dunnett Craven, specialists in retail properties, in collaboration with the Viennese planning office of architect and master builder Franz Riedl.

In 2012, the Kitchen (formerly Donau Plex) catering area was renovated. The catering options were expanded and the cinemas were upgraded and equipped with IMAX technology.

At 6 a.m on 9 March 2019, a fire broke out at the Donau Zentrum, requiring a major fire brigade operation that lasted a total of 12 hours. The professional fire brigade temporarily declared alert level 4. In the affected area near the Zentrum Kagran subway station, four shops, a veterinarian's office, and a plasma center were damaged. The fire is believed to have been caused by construction work.

On the afternoon of 20 April 2020, another fire broke out in the roof. Due to the COVID-19 pandemic, most of the shops in the shopping center were closed, and the few local shops that were open were evacuated. The fire was brought under control by the evening.

In both incidents, one firefighter was injured during the operation. No civilians were harmed.

== Owner ==
The owner is the real estate and investment company Unibail-Rodamco-Westfield, based in Paris. In 2003, the company acquired 90 percent of the shares in the Donau Zentrum from the Breiteneder family for a purchase price of 270 million euros.

== Transportation ==
Since 1982, the shopping center has had a direct connection to the U1 subway line. The shopping center can also be reached by tram line 25 and the Vienna city bus lines 22A, 26A, 27A, 93A and 94A.

== Shops ==
There are currently 262 shops (shops, service providers and restaurants) and 13 cinemas available in the Donau Zentrum and in the Kitchen. There was also a nightclub until 2018.

== Attendance ==
The shopping center is frequented by around 19 million visitors and 3,000 employees annually.
