= Kagraner Platz station =

Vienna U-Bahn station

Kagraner Platz
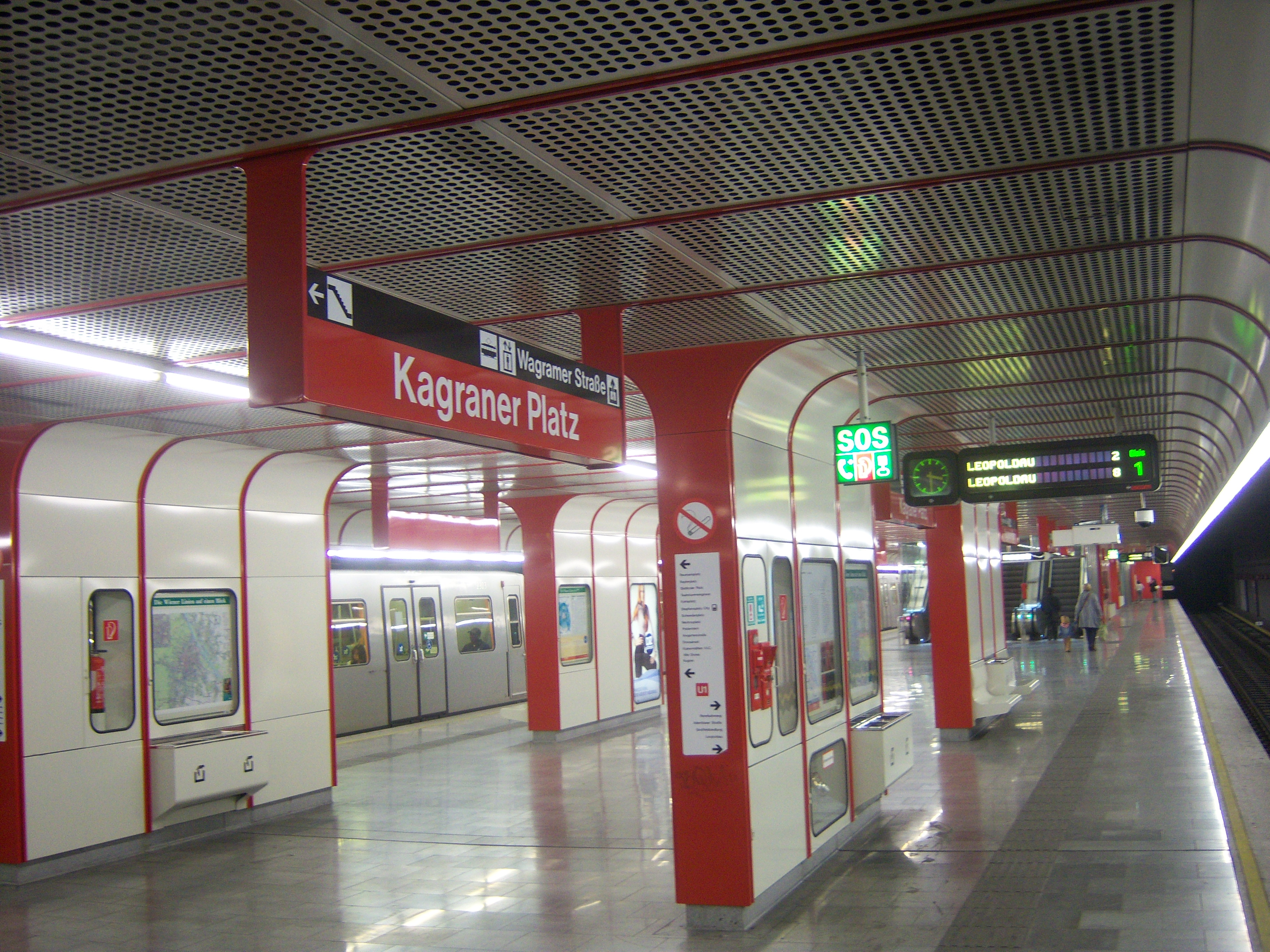

General information
- Location: Donaustadt, Vienna; Austria
- Coordinates: 48.2506°N 16.4437°E

Construction
- Structure type: Underground

History
- Opened: 2 September 2006

Services
Preceding station	Wiener Linien	Following station
Kagran toward Oberlaa	U1	Rennbahnweg toward Leopoldau
Location

Kagraner Platz is a station on U1 of the Vienna U-Bahn. It is located in the Donaustadt District. It opened in 2006.
