= Donauinsel station =

Vienna U-Bahn station

Donauinsel
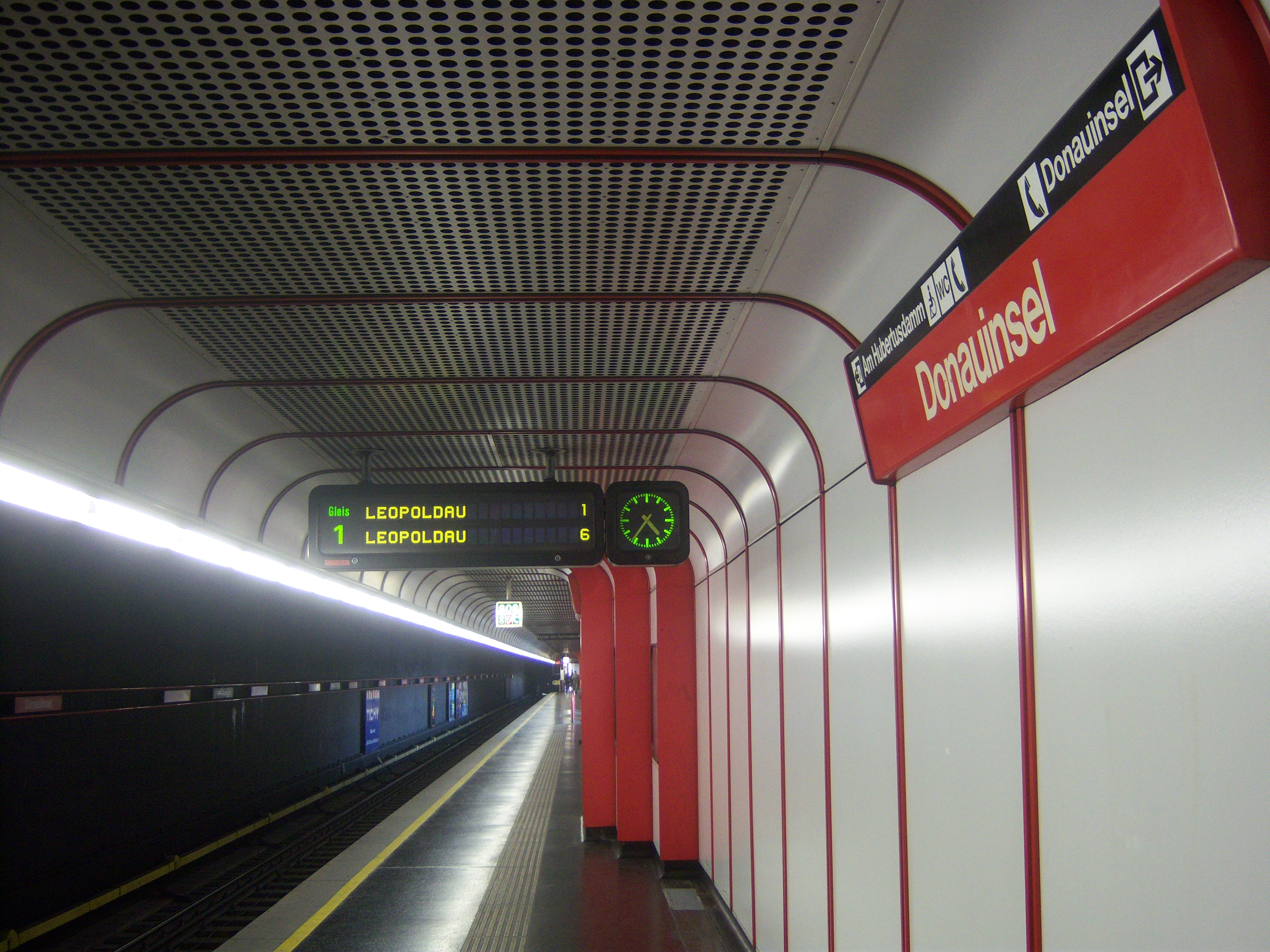
- Platform

General information
- Location: Donaustadt, Vienna; Austria
- Coordinates: 48.2287°N 16.4103°E

History
- Opened: 3 September 1982

Services
Preceding station	Wiener Linien	Following station
Vorgartenstraße toward Oberlaa	U1	Kaisermühlen-VIC toward Leopoldau
Location

Donauinsel is a station on U1 of the Vienna U-Bahn. It is located on Donauinsel Island, in the Donaustadt district. It opened in 1982. The station is below the Reichsbrücke bridge.
