= Vorgartenstraße station =

Vienna U-Bahn station

Vorgartenstraße
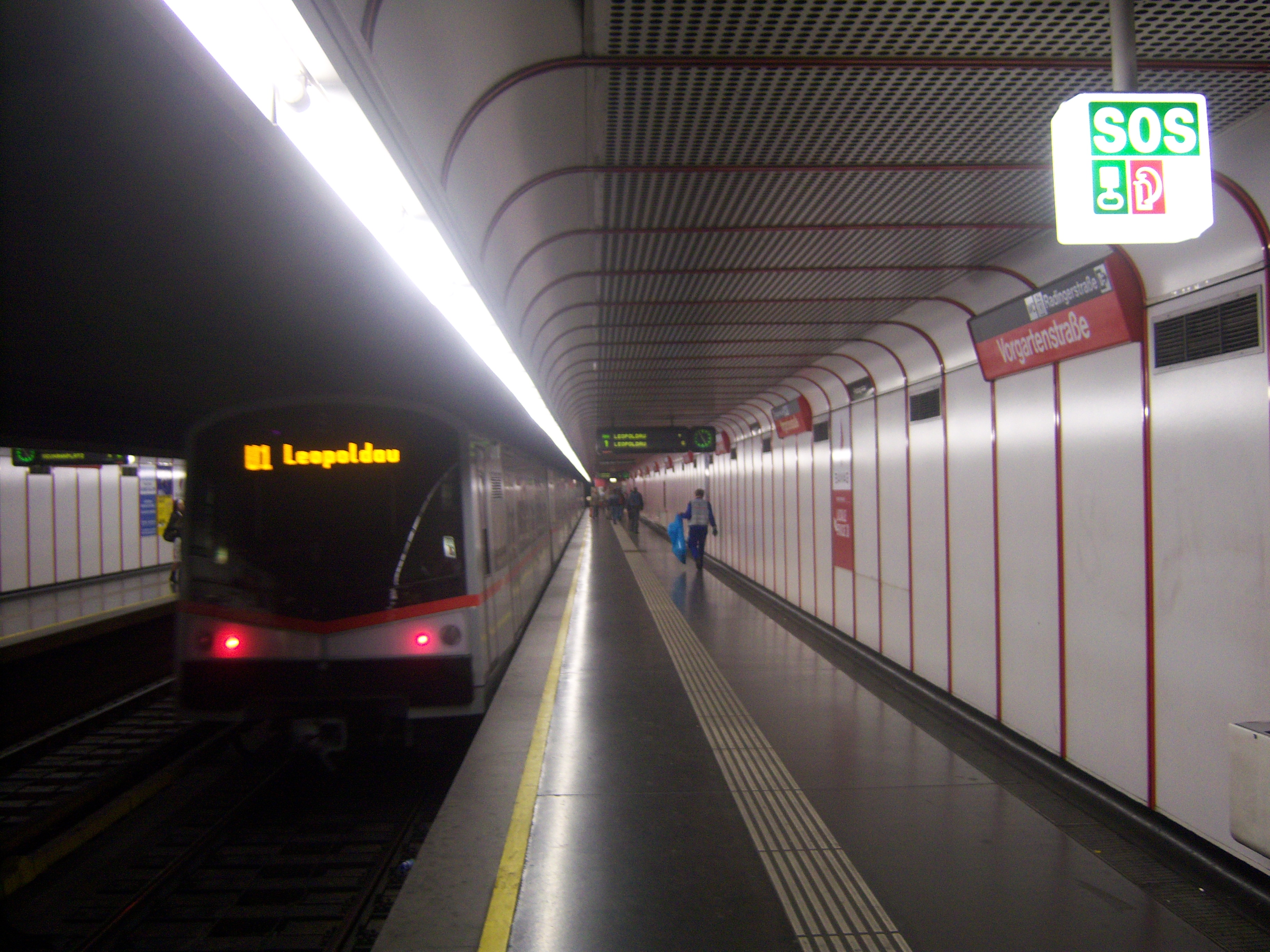

General information
- Location: Leopoldstadt, Vienna; Austria
- Coordinates: 48.2240°N 16.4018°E

History
- Opened: 3 September 1982

Services
Preceding station	Wiener Linien	Following station
Praterstern toward Oberlaa	U1	Donauinsel toward Leopoldau
Location

Vorgartenstraße is a Metro station on the U1 Line of the Vienna U-Bahn. It is located in the Leopoldstadt District. The station was first opened to the public on September 3, 1982. Its name derives from the adjacent road "Vorgartenstraße" (literal translation: "Front-Yard-Street"), which had been named that way in 1903 due to its, at the time, unusually high number of residences containing a front yard.
