= Großfeldsiedlung station =

Vienna U-Bahn station

Großfeldsiedlung
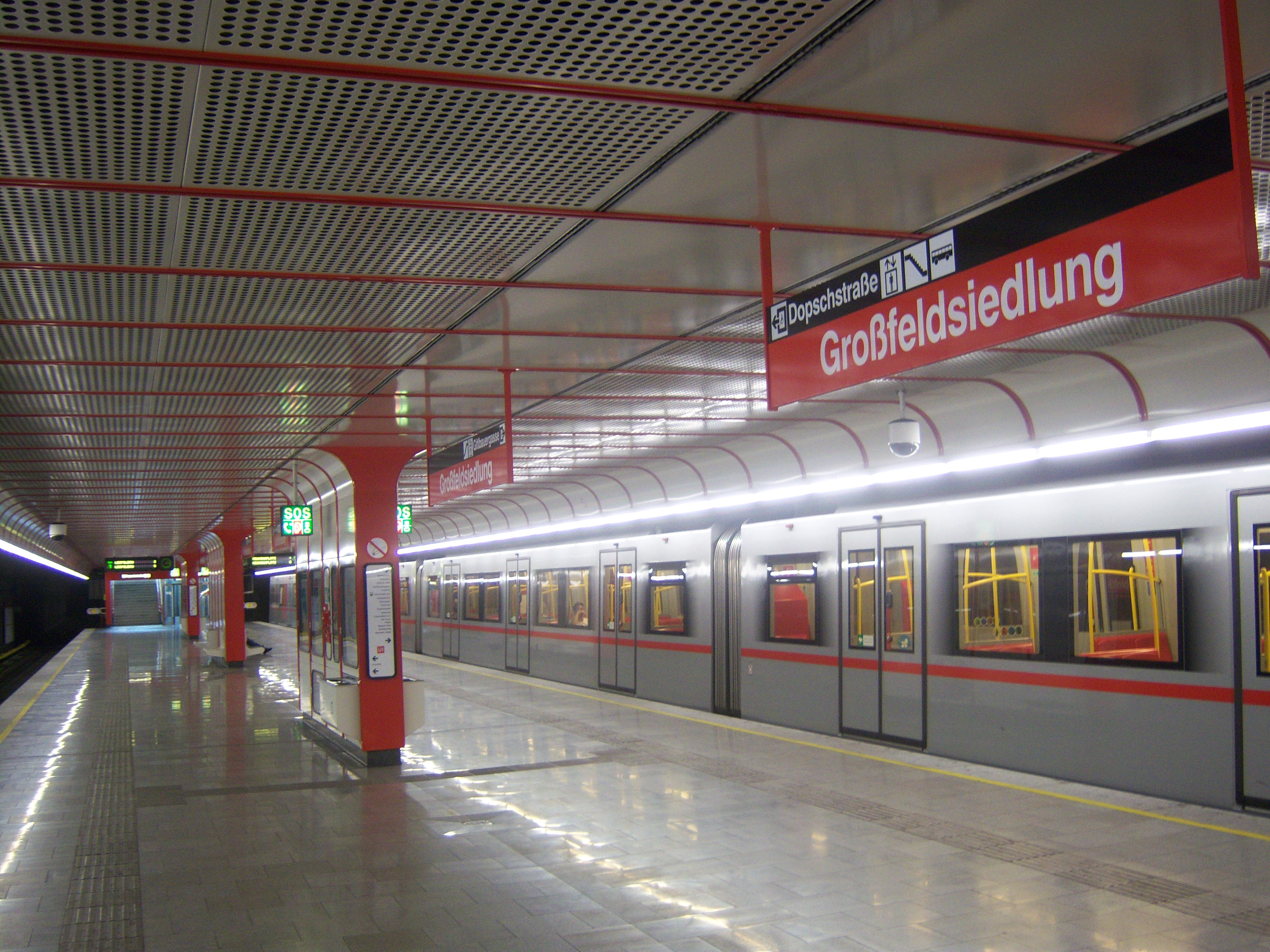

General information
- Location: Floridsdorf, Vienna; Austria
- Coordinates: 48.2704°N 16.4482°E

History
- Opened: 2 September 2006

Services
Preceding station	Wiener Linien	Following station
Aderklaaer Straße toward Oberlaa	U1	Leopoldau Terminus
Location

Großfeldsiedlung is an underground station of the Vienna U-Bahn Line U1 in the 21st district, Floridsdorf. It lies directly below the Kürschnergasse and extends between Dopschstraße and Gitlbauergasse. In the 1960s, the large-scale and long-field district building named after the station was named after the former field name Großfeldsiedlung and Großfeldstraße.

The station was opened on September 2, 2006, with the commissioning of the last section of the U1 between the stations Kagran and Leopoldau. From the central platform, you can reach the Dopschstraße or Gitlbauergasse by means of lifts and fixed stairs.

There are transfer options to the bus lines 28A and 29A towards Floridsdorf U6 station. Around the station is a large field settlement, built from 1966 to 1973 urban housing complex with about 30,000 residents.
