= Alte Donau station =

Vienna U-Bahn station

Alte Donau
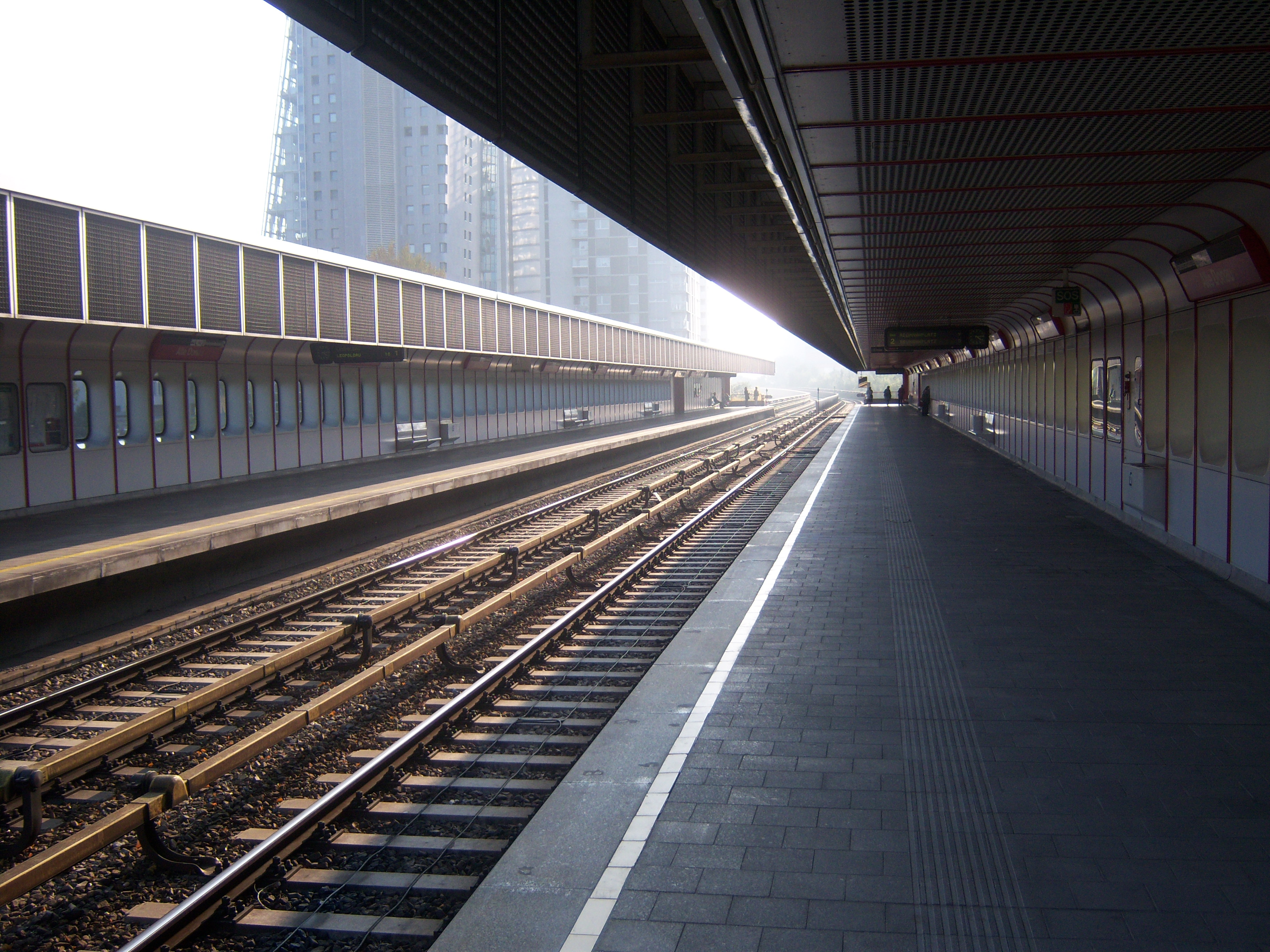

General information
- Location: Donaustadt, Vienna; Austria
- Coordinates: 48.2382°N 16.4247°E

History
- Opened: 3 September 1982

Services
Preceding station	Wiener Linien	Following station
Kaisermühlen-VIC toward Oberlaa	U1	Kagran toward Leopoldau
Location

Alte Donau is a station on U1 of the Vienna U-Bahn. It is located in the Donaustadt district. It opened in 1982.
