= Rennbahnweg station =

Vienna U-Bahn station

Rennbahnweg
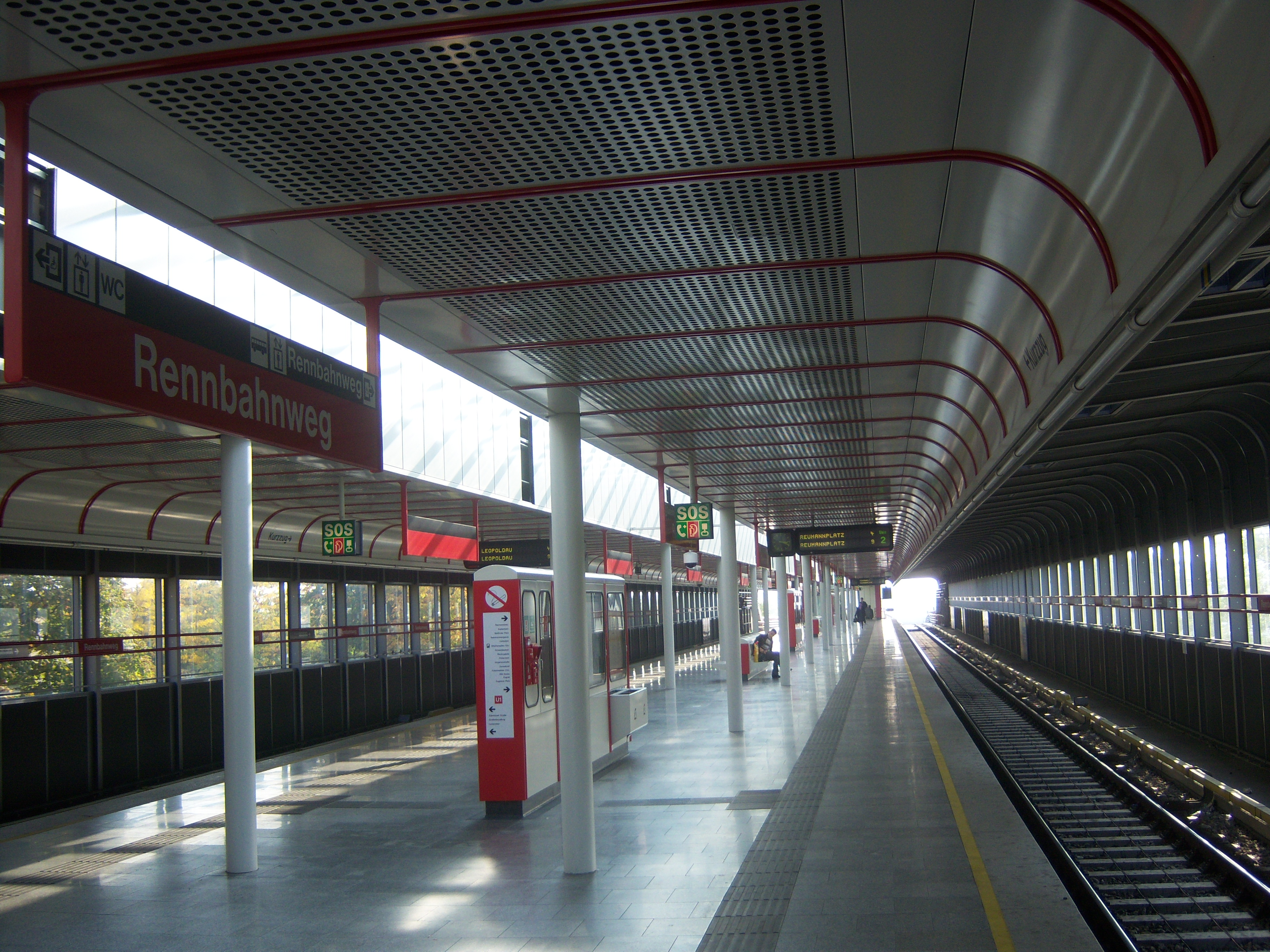

General information
- Location: Donaustadt, Vienna; Austria
- Coordinates: 48.2576°N 16.4496°E

History
- Opened: 2 September 2006

Services
Preceding station	Wiener Linien	Following station
Kagraner Platz toward Oberlaa	U1	Aderklaaer Straße toward Leopoldau
Location

Rennbahnweg is a station on U1 of the Vienna U-Bahn. It is located in the Donaustadt District and opened in 2006.
