= Schwedenplatz station =

Vienna U-Bahn station

Schwedenplatz
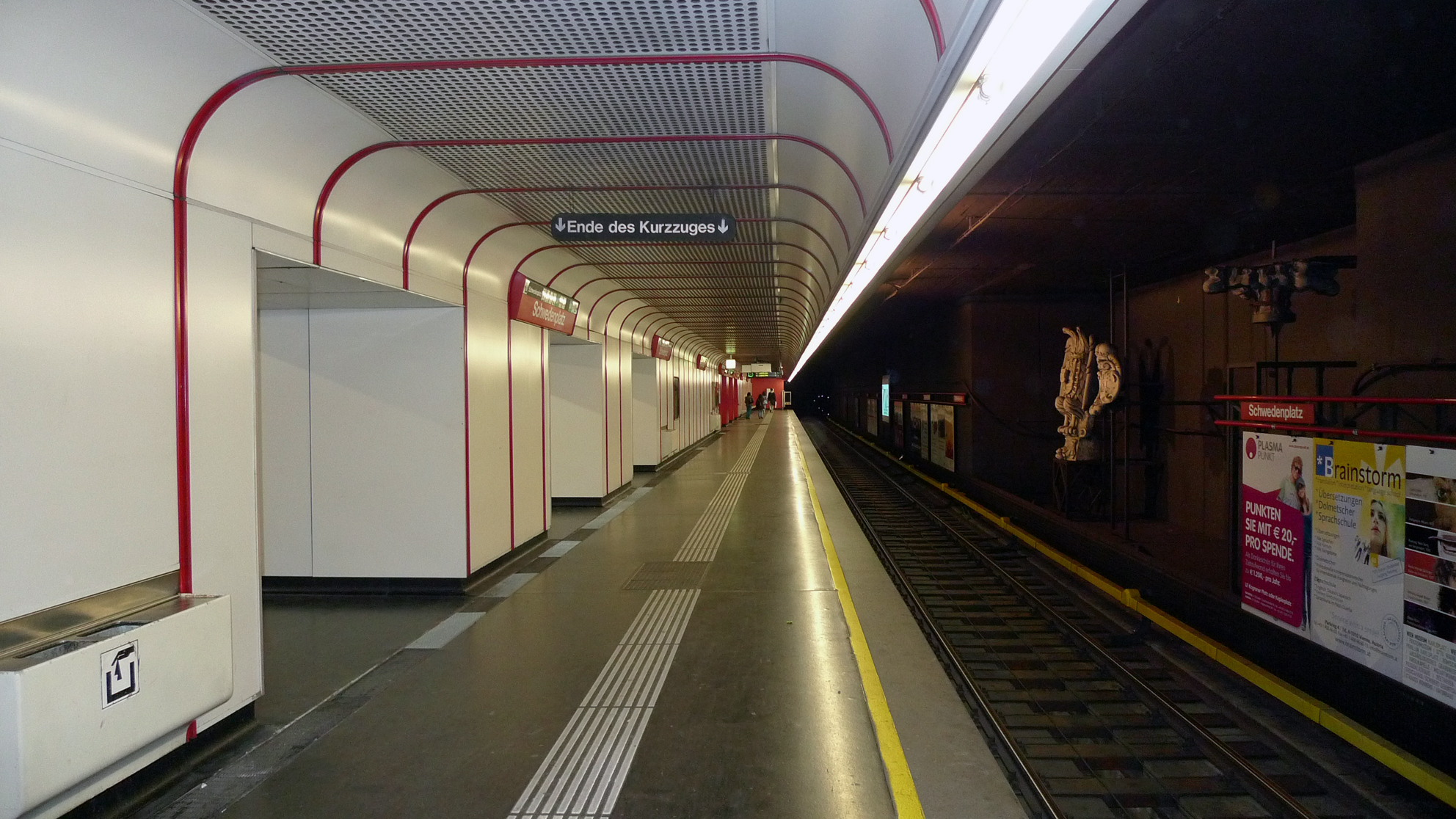
- Line U1 platform

General information
- Location: Innere Stadt, Vienna; Austria
- Coordinates: 48.2118°N 16.3777°E
- Line: 1 2 VRT 2A N25 N38 N60 N66 VAL Bratislava-Ferry

History
- Opened: 1979

Services
Preceding station	Wiener Linien	Following station
Stephansplatz toward Oberlaa	U1	Nestroyplatz toward Leopoldau
Landstraße toward Hütteldorf	U4	Schottenring toward Heiligenstadt
Location

Schwedenplatz is a station on U1 and U4 of the Vienna U-Bahn. It is located at the Schwedenplatz square in the Innere Stadt District. It opened in 1979. It used to be known as Stadtbahn.
