= Keplerplatz station =

Vienna U-Bahn station

Keplerplatz
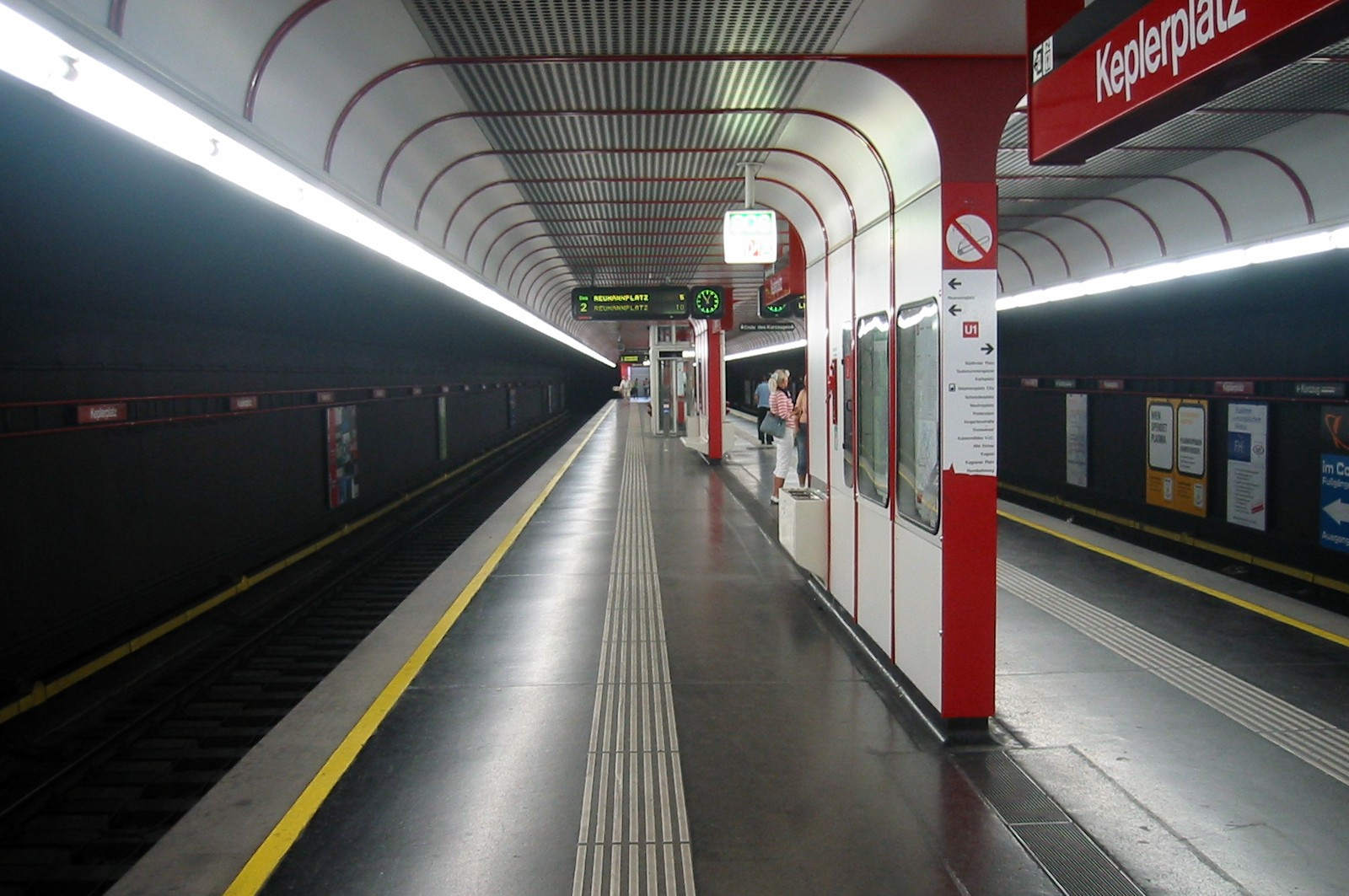

General information
- Location: Favoriten, Vienna; Austria
- Coordinates: 48.1797°N 16.3760°E

History
- Opened: 25 February 1978

Services
Preceding station	Wiener Linien	Following station
Reumannplatz toward Oberlaa	U1	Südtiroler Platz-Hauptbahnhof toward Leopoldau
Location

Keplerplatz is a station on U1 of the Vienna U-Bahn. It is located in the Favoriten District. It opened in 1978.
