= Nestroyplatz station =

Vienna U-Bahn station

Nestroyplatz
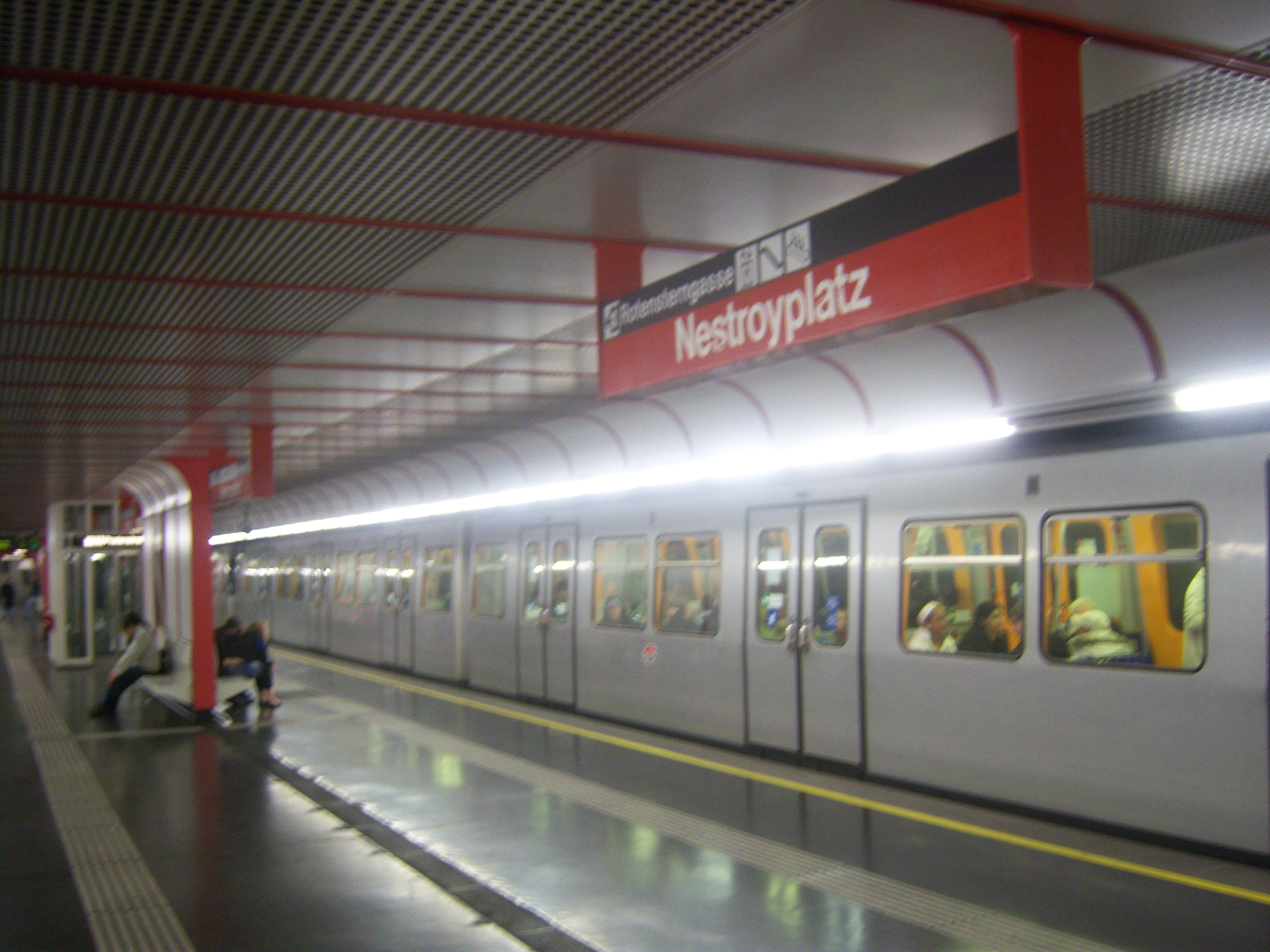

General information
- Location: Leopoldstadt, Vienna; Austria
- Coordinates: 48.2155°N 16.3859°E

History
- Opened: 1979

Services
Preceding station	Wiener Linien	Following station
Schwedenplatz toward Oberlaa	U1	Praterstern toward Leopoldau
Location

Nestroyplatz is a station on U1 of the Vienna U-Bahn. It is located at Nestroyplatz Square, in the Leopoldstadt District. It opened in 1979.
