= Praterstern station =

Vienna U-Bahn station

Praterstern
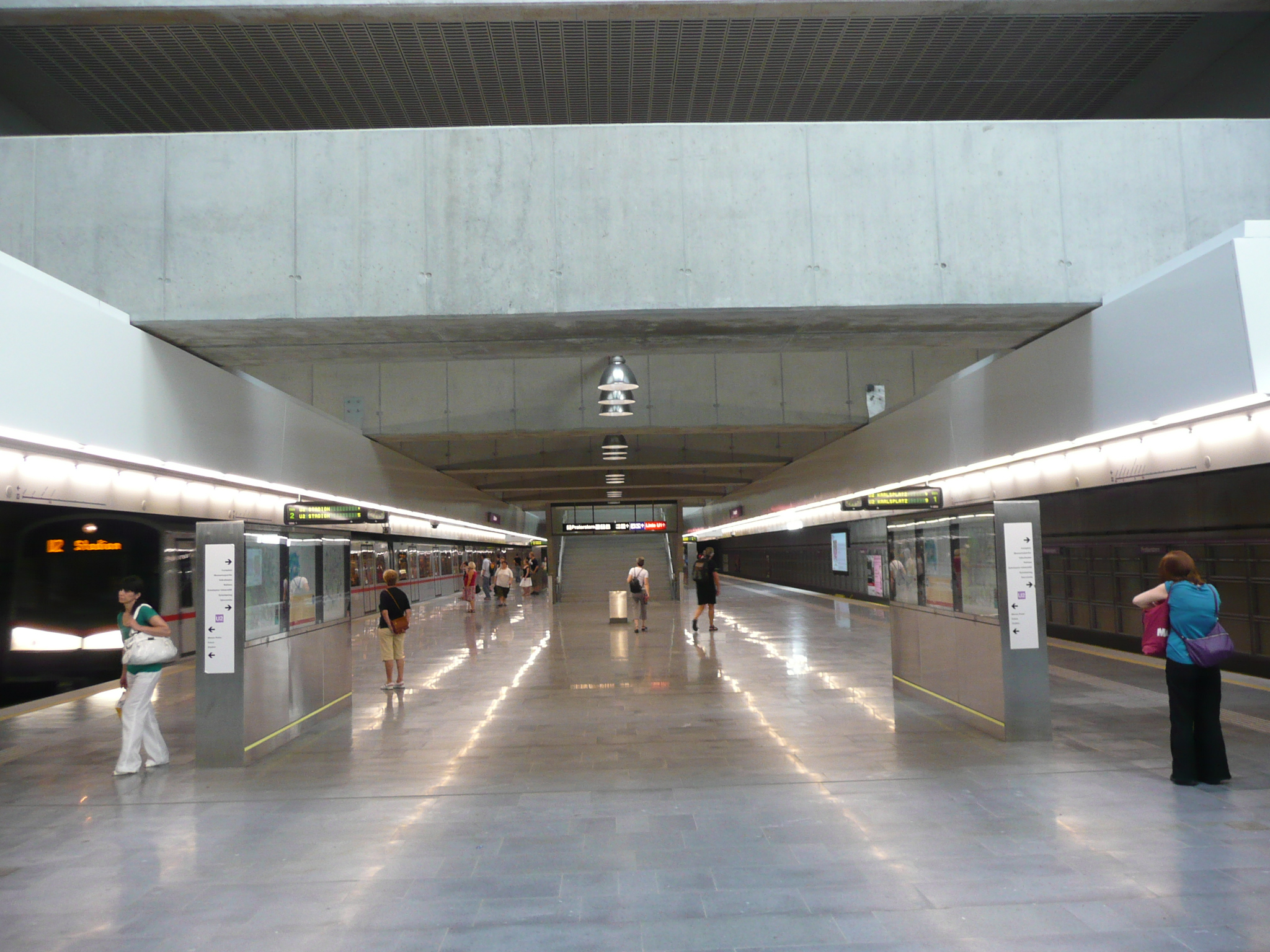
- U2 platform

General information
- Location: Leopoldstadt, Vienna; Austria
- Coordinates: 48.2187°N 16.3930°E

History
- Opened: 1981

Services
| Preceding station | Wiener Linien | Following station |
|---|---|---|
| Nestroyplatz toward Oberlaa | U1 | Vorgartenstraße toward Leopoldau |
| Taborstraße toward Karlsplatz | U2 | Messe-Prater toward Seestadt |
Location

Praterstern is a station on the U1 and U2 of the Vienna U-Bahn. The U-Bahn station is connected the Wien Praterstern railway station, which is served by regional trains, and by lines S1, S2, S3 and S7 of the Vienna S-Bahn. It is located in the Leopoldstadt, Vienna's 2nd district. The U-Bahn station opened in 1981.

== About ==
The underground station first opened in 1981 as part of the U1 line. In 2008, it was integrated into the U2 line as part of the line’s second expansion. The station is located beneath the Praterstern road junction, at the confluence of Lassallestraße, Ausstellungsstraße, and Praterstraße. It is the closest station to the Wurstelprater and the Vienna Riesenrad.
