= Kaisermühlen (disambiguation) =

Kaisermühlen is a neighbourhood in the Donaustadt district of Vienna, Austria

Kaisermühlen may also refer to:

- Kaisermühlen (Vienna U-Bahn), on line U1
- Kaisermühlen Blues, an Austrian television series
