= Kaisermühlen-VIC station =

Vienna U-Bahn station

Kaisermühlen-VIC
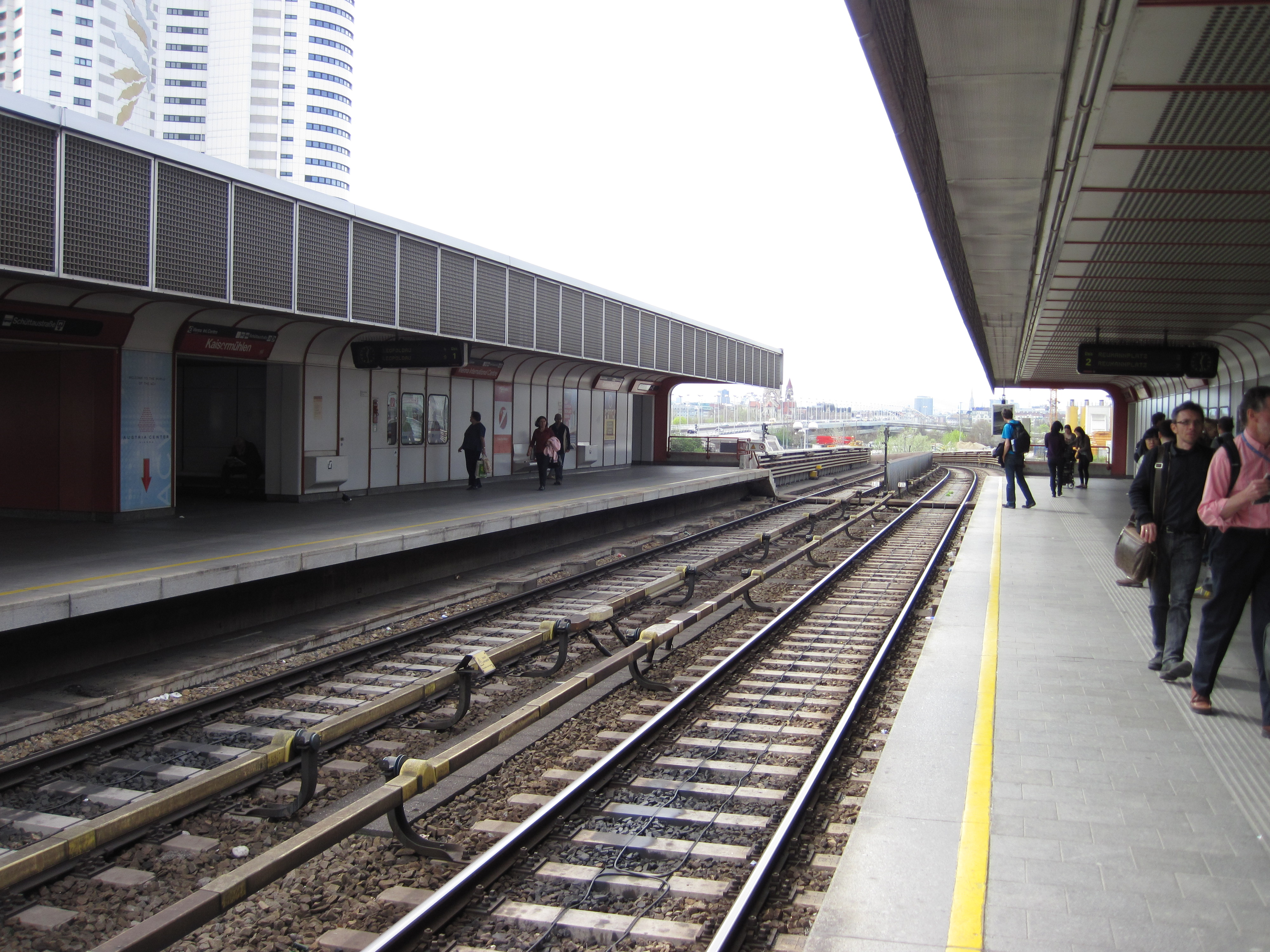

General information
- Location: Donaustadt, Vienna; Austria
- Coordinates: 48.2329°N 16.4165°E

History
- Opened: 3 September 1982

Services
Preceding station	Wiener Linien	Following station
Donauinsel toward Oberlaa	U1	Alte Donau toward Leopoldau
Location

Kaisermühlen-VIC is a station on U1 of the Vienna U-Bahn. It is located in the Donaustadt District next to the Vienna International Centre. It opened in 1982.
