= Neulaa station =

Vienna U-Bahn station

Neulaa
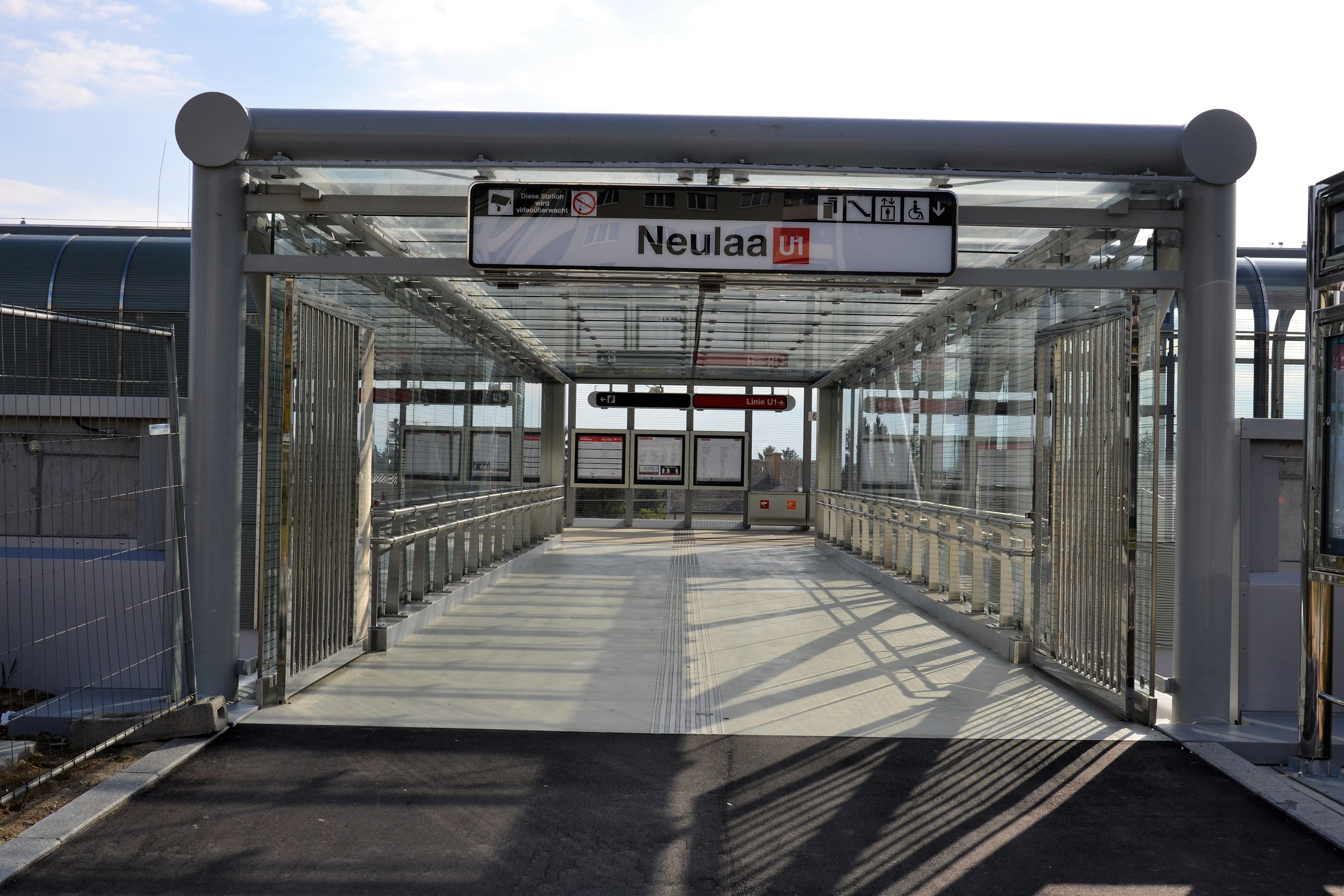

General information
- Location: Favoriten, Vienna; Austria
- Coordinates: 48.1457°N 16.3859°E
- Line: P+R

History
- Opened: 2 September 2017

Services
Preceding station	Wiener Linien	Following station
Oberlaa Terminus	U1	Alaudagasse toward Leopoldau
Location

Neulaa is a station on line U1 of the Vienna U-Bahn located in the 10th district of Vienna. It was opened on September 2, 2017. It is part of the extension of the U1 from Reumannplatz to the Therme Wien at Oberlaa station.

The station was erected above ground, where the tram line 67 had been running before 2014, the section of which was built here in Oberlaa for the Vienna 1974 International Garden Exhibition. Access from the Per-Albin-Hansson-Siedlung Ost is via an underground access at the station's west end and a bridge at the east end. Through two new passages under the Donauländebahn, the Pickgasse and the Weidelstraße have access to the subway station.

To the north of Neulaa station, extensive construction buildings were built, which were re-greened and covered with soil after the station's completion.

Between this station and the terminal Oberlaa, new storage and inspection depots were built.

West of the station, between the railway tracks and the Favoritenstraße, a park-and-ride facility for commuters was built.
