= St. Leopold's Church, Donaufeld =

Church in Floridsdorf, Austria

Coordinates: 48°15′11″N 16°24′30″E

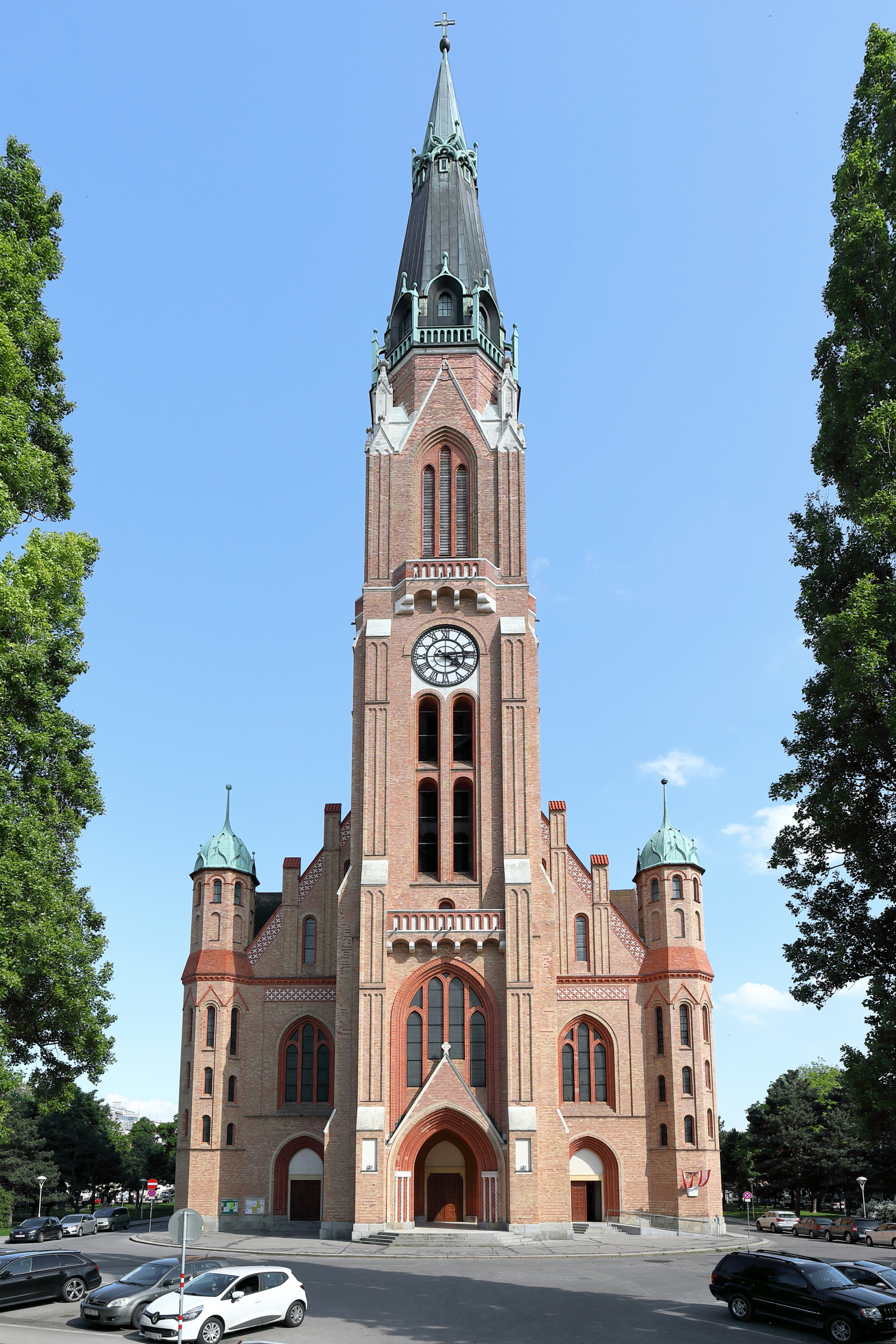
Saint Leopold's Church

Saint Leopold's Church (German: Kirche zum Heiligen Leopold, "Donaufelder Kirche") is the Roman Catholic parish church of Donaufeld in Floridsdorf, the 21st district of Vienna, Austria.

Located at Kinzerplatz, it stands at a height of 96 m (315 feet), which makes it the third tallest church in Vienna. Construction was completed in 1914, ten years after the death of its architect, Franz Neumann. Earlier plans to use the church as a cathedral for a new diocese east of the Danube were abandoned when Floridsdorf was merged into Vienna in 1904. The rectory was built under the premise of serving as a bishop's residence. Today the parish belongs to the Archdiocese of Vienna and is entrusted to the pastoral care of the Augustinian Canons of Klosterneuburg.

It is dedicated to Saint Leopold, patron saint of Austria and founder of Klosterneuburg.
