= Kagran station =

Vienna U-Bahn station

Kagran
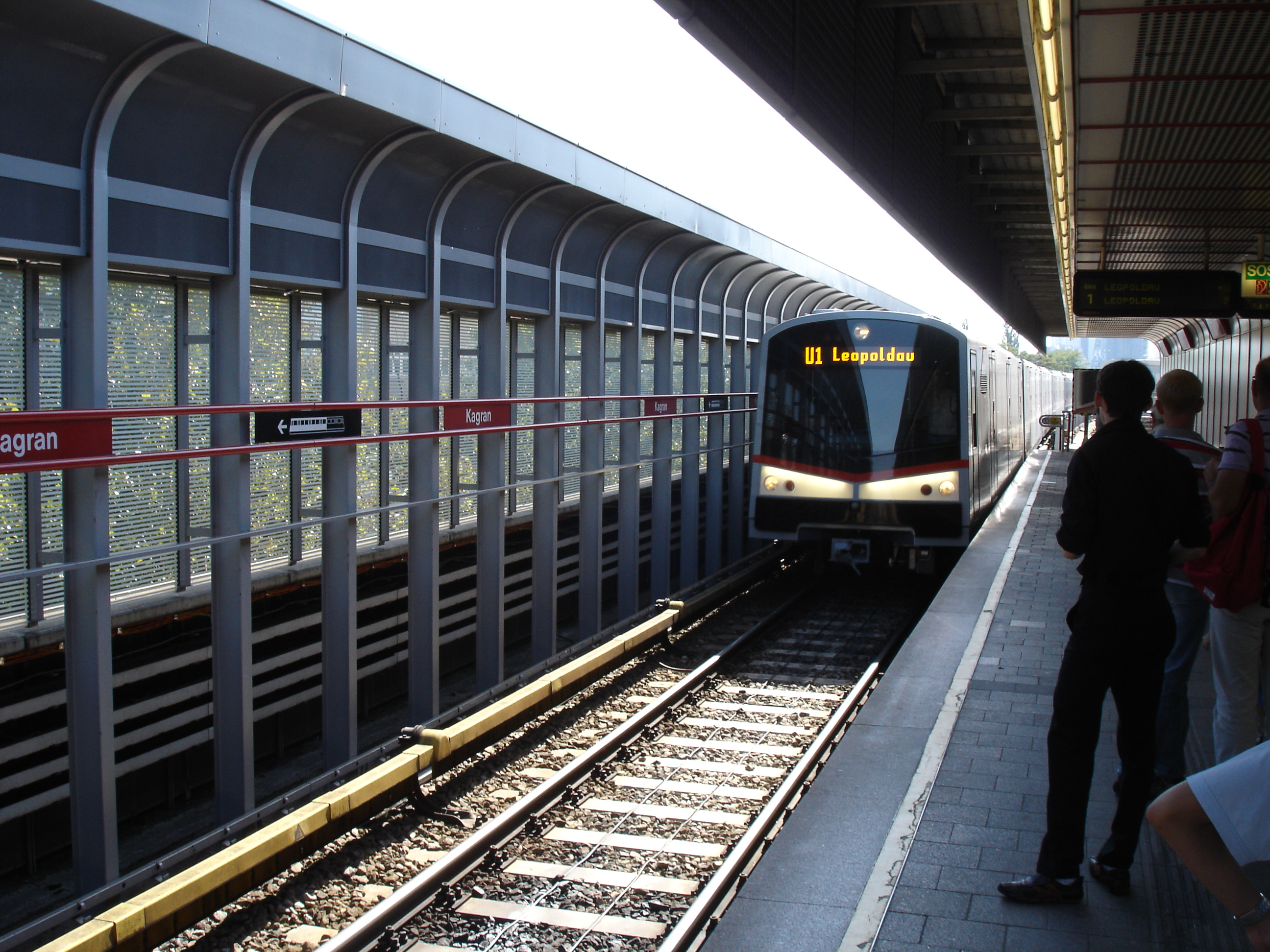
- U1 train arriving at Kagran station

General information
- Location: Donaustadt, Vienna; Austria
- Coordinates: 48.2429°N 16.4328°E

History
- Opened: 3 September 1982

Services
Preceding station	Wiener Linien	Following station
Alte Donau toward Oberlaa	U1	Kagraner Platz toward Leopoldau
Location

Kagran is a station on U1 of the Vienna U-Bahn in Kagran, Donaustadt. It opened in 1982.

== Nearby landmarks ==
- Austrian Horticultural Museum
- Erste Bank Arena and Sporthalle Kagran
- Hertha Firnberg Schulen für Wirtschaft und Tourismus
- Japanese International School in Vienna
- Vienna DC Timberwolves Wolves Dome
- Westfield Donau Zentrum shopping centre
- Wiener Linien Kagram tram depot
