= Floridsdorf =

Coordinates: 48°17′00″N 16°24′44″E

Floridsdorf Fluridsduaf (Bavarian)
- 21st District of Vienna
- Coat of arms

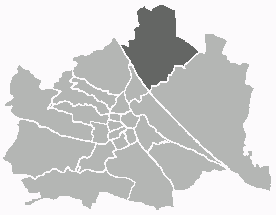
- Location of the district within Vienna
- Country: Austria
- City: Vienna

Government
  - District Director: Georg Papai (SPÖ)
  - First Deputy: Ilse Fitzbauer (SPÖ)
  - Second Deputy: Karl Mareda (FPÖ)
  - Representation (60 Members): SPÖ 27, FPÖ 18, ÖVP 5, Green 6, NEOS 3, HC 1, KPÖ 1

Area
  - Total: 44.46 km^{2} (17.17 sq mi)

Population (2016-01-01)
  - Total: 155,998
  - Density: 3,509/km^{2} (9,088/sq mi)
- Postal code: A-1210
- Address of District Office: Am Spitz 1 A-1211 Wien
- Website: www.wien.gv.at/bezirke/floridsdorf/

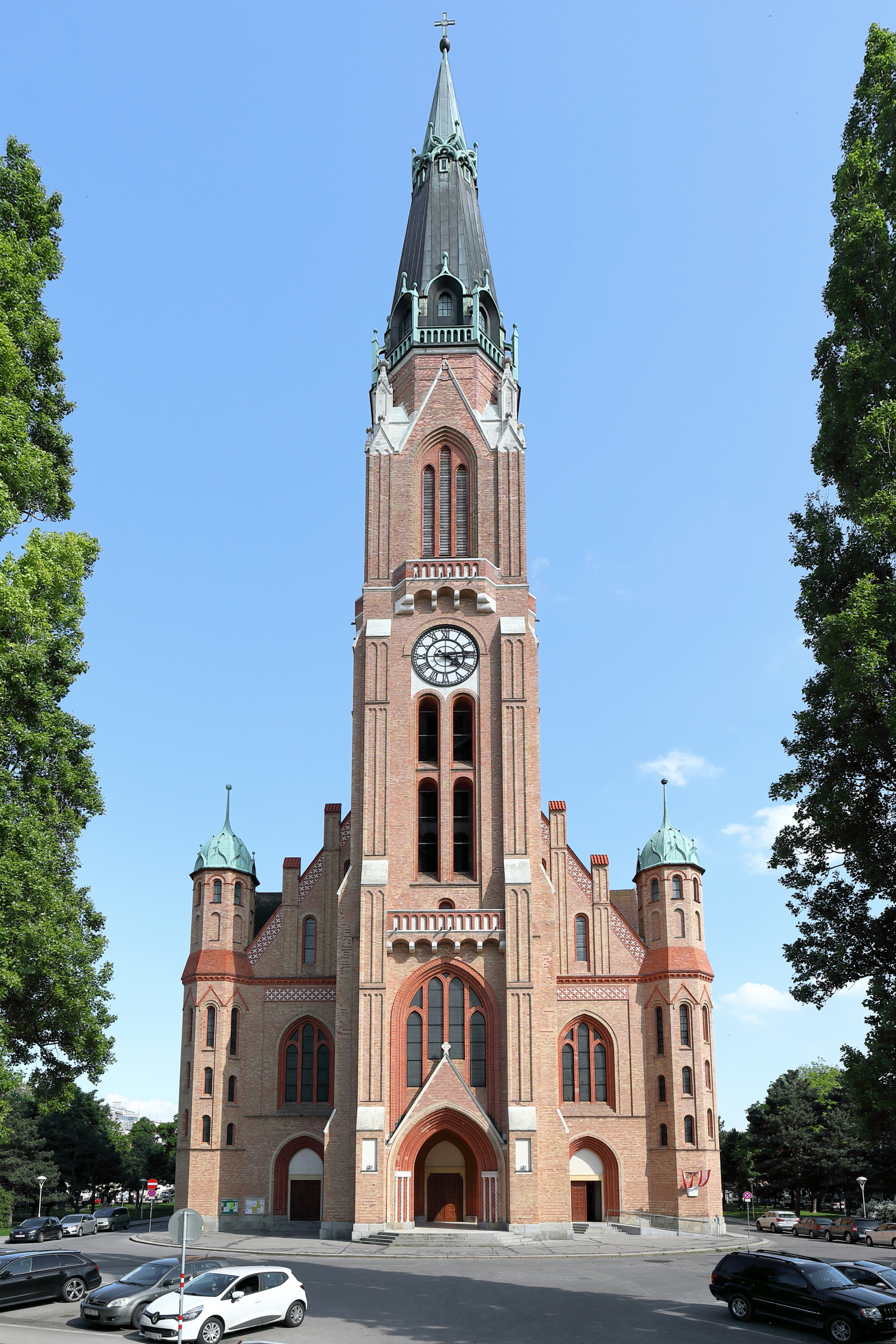
Donaufeld parish church.

Floridsdorf (Austrian German: [ˈfloːrɪdsdɔrf]; Viennese: Fluridsduaf) is the 21st district of Vienna, Austria (21. Bezirk). Located north of the Danube, it comprises former villages such as Floridsdorf, Donaufeld, Jedlesee, Leopoldau, Stammersdorf, Strebersdorf, and Groß-Jedlersdorf. With a population of over 189,000 in 2025, it is Vienna’s third most populous district and one of the fastest growing. Floridsdorf is known for its blend of urban infrastructure and green spaces, including vineyards, parks, and historical architecture

== Geography ==
Floridsdorf lies in the northeastern part of Vienna, on the left bank of the Danube. It is bordered to the south and west by the Danube River (across which lie the districts of Brigittenau and Döbling), to the east by the 22nd District (Donaustadt), and to the north by Lower Austria. The terrain is diverse: the northwest includes the gentle foothills of the Bisamberg (a hill of which 320 m lies within the district), while the southeast is a flat plain formed by the Danube’s old floodplain. The Danube itself, along with the parallel New Danube channel and part of the Danube Island, forms Floridsdorf’s southern boundary. The northern segment of the Old Danube (an oxbow lake of the Danube) also flows through the district, providing popular waterfront recreation. In 1870–1875, the Danube Regulation tamed the river’s floods and created new land for settlement in Floridsdorf’s southern plains.

The district contains abundant green areas and parks. Vineyards and agricultural fields still characterize the northern localities of Stammersdorf and Strebersdorf, where the slopes of the Bisamberg are covered with vineyards and protected meadows (the Alte Schanzen, former 1866 military earthworks, now a nature reserve). Remnants of riparian forest survive in the Schwarze Lackenau wetlands and the Floridsdorfer Aupark, recalling the Danube’s original floodplain ecosystem. The Marchfeldkanal – a canal completed in 1992 – cuts across Floridsdorf, its banks forming a green corridor and feeding ponds that host rare flora and fauna. Despite urbanization, pockets of vegetable farms and garden allotments remain in areas like Donaufeld, though these open spaces have been steadily receding with new housing projects.

=== Subdivisions ===
Administratively, Floridsdorf is divided into localities corresponding to the former villages and cadastral communities. The seven core subdivisions are Floridsdorf (central area around Am Spitz), Donaufeld, Großjedlersdorf (often further split into Groß-Jedlersdorf I & II), Jedlesee, Leopoldau, Stammersdorf, and Strebersdorf. In addition, Floridsdorf includes small parts of Kagran and Kaisermühlen that border the 22nd District. Each quarter has a distinct character: for example, Floridsdorf center (Am Spitz) is a busy urban node and district administrative center, whereas Stammersdorf retains a village atmosphere famous for its Heuriger wine taverns and vineyards.

For statistical purposes, the district is further divided into 28 Zählbezirke (census tracts). These carry names often derived from local neighborhoods or landmarks – e.g., Großfeldsiedlung (a large post-war housing estate), Siemensstraße, Jedlersdorf, or Autokader (named after a historic Imperial automobile factory). The census districts largely align with the traditional sub-districts but with some differences in borders. They reflect Floridsdorf’s development, from the old village cores (like Schwarzlackenau or Mühlschüttel) to 20th-century settlements (Nordrandsiedlung, Donaufelder Gartenstadt) and industrial zones (Industriegelände Bahndreieck).

Public transportation (mainly Wiener Linien English: Vienna Lines) in Floridsdorf is very common for example: Underground Lines (U1, U6), Buses (29A, 29B, 31A, ...)

=== Parks and Natural Areas ===
Floridsdorf offers extensive green and recreational spaces. The Danube Island (Donauinsel), a long artificial island created as part of flood control, spans the district’s southern edge and provides parks, beaches, and cycling paths. On the island, the Japanese Cherry Tree Park (Kirschenhain) near the Jedleseer Brücke footbridge is notable for its annual cherry blossom festival. The Old Danube’s shores host lidos and boating areas popular in summer. In the north, the slopes of the Bisamberg and the adjacent nature reserve (including the Alte Schanzen) are crisscrossed with hiking trails and dotted with heuriger wine gardens, blending nature with Vienna’s wine culture. A new central park, the Gaswerk-Park, is being created as part of the “Neu Leopoldau” development on the site of the old gas works, adding 8,500 m² of green space in the heart of a new residential quarter.

== History ==
=== Prehistory and Antiquity ===
Human settlement in the Floridsdorf area dates back to prehistoric times. Archaeological finds indicate that Neolithic people (New Stone Age, c. 4000–2000 BC) lived here, as evidenced by stone axes and pottery fragments unearthed in the district. In the Leopoldau area, now part of Floridsdorf, weapons and jewelry from the Bronze Age have been discovered, indicating continuous settlement into antiquity.

==== Celtic and Roman Period ====
By around 500 BC, Celtic tribes inhabited the region, though their influence waned with the arrival of the Romans. During the Roman era, the area north of the Danube, opposite the Roman city of Vindobona, formed a border zone between the Roman Empire and Germanic tribes, often witnessing skirmishes and serving as a no-man's-land.

==== Early Migrations and Bavarian Settlement ====
After the end of Roman rule in the 5th century, waves of migrating peoples passed through or settled in the area, including the Lombards, Avars, and Slavs. The Avars were defeated by Charlemagne around 800, after which Bavarian settlers entered the region.

==== Babenberg Rule and First Records ====
By the late 9th and 10th centuries, the territory came under Hagyar raids until their defeat in 955. Under the Babenberg rule of eastern Austria, beginning in the late 10th century, the area began to be resettled and organized. The earliest recorded settlement in what is now Floridsdorf is Jedlesee, which is mentioned in a 1014 deed as Outcinessevve, meaning Uz's Lake, issued by Emperor Henry II for the Bishop of Passau.

=== Early and High Middle Ages ===
Throughout the Middle Ages, the Floridsdorf area was under various lordships as part of the region northeast of Vienna. By the 12th and 13th centuries, villages like Jedlersdorf, recorded as Vrliugestorf in the mid-1100s, and Jedlesee existed along the Danube's old channels.

==== Flooding and Ferry Crossings ====
The territory was frequently affected by flooding from the unregulated Danube, which often altered property boundaries and made agriculture challenging. For a long period, crossing the Danube from this area was only possible by ferry. The strategic importance of the location grew over time; a small ferry settlement at Jedlesee prospered by operating a boat service across the Schwarze Lacke, an old Danube arm, for travelers heading toward Vienna.

==== Emergence of Am Spitz and First Bridges ====
By the Late Middle Ages, major overland trade routes from Vienna into Bohemia and Moravia converged at a point known as Am Spitz. Around 1500, the first permanent bridge, Taborbrücke, was constructed, followed by the Kuhbrückl. These facilitated growth and led to a roadside settlement called Jedlersdorf am Spitz.

=== Formation of Floridsdorf and 19th-Century Growth ===
==== Naming and Early Community Organization ====
In 1786, Floridus Leeb granted land east of Am Spitz to settlers, and the area was named Floridsdorf in his honor.

==== Industrialization and Railways ====
Floridsdorf transformed during the 19th century with the arrival of the railway in 1837, becoming Austria's first railway station north of the Danube. The development of additional railways and factories, including the locomotive factory in 1869, turned it into an industrial hub.

==== Expansion and Status as a Town ====
By 1894, Floridsdorf merged with Donaufeld, Jedlesee, and Neu-Jedlersdorf, forming a municipality of over 30,000 people. It was officially recognized as a town, and a town hall was built between 1901 and 1903.

=== Incorporation into Vienna in 1905 ===
Floridsdorf was incorporated into Vienna as the 21st district effective 1 January 1905. This followed political negotiations and a town council petition. The town hall became the district's Magistratisches Bezirksamt.

=== Floridsdorf during World War II ===
==== Territorial Changes and Persecution ====
In 1938, Floridsdorf lost eastern parts to the new 22nd District and gained Stammersdorf. The Floridsdorf synagogue was destroyed in 1938, and a subcamp of the Mauthausen concentration camp was established in Jedlesee in 1944.

==== Bombing and Soviet Occupation ====
Floridsdorf was bombed by the Allies and saw heavy fighting in April 1945. The Floridsdorfer Brücke and the Bisamberg transmitter were destroyed. Soviet forces occupied the district on 15 April 1945.

=== Post-war Floridsdorf ===
==== Border Adjustments and Housing ====
In 1954, district boundaries were finalized. Stammersdorf became part of Floridsdorf, while areas like Kagran went to the 22nd District. Housing projects such as Schlingerhof, Karl-Seitz-Hof, and Großfeldsiedlung (1966–1973) supported post-war growth.

==== Infrastructure and Transport ====
Floridsdorf gained major transport improvements: S-Bahn (1962), Nordbrücke (de) (1964), Brigittenauer Brücke (1983), and U6 metro (1996). The Veterinary University relocated to the district (1990–1996).

=== Floridsdorf in the 21st Century ===
Floridsdorf continues to grow with developments in Donaufeld and Neu-Stammersdorf. The U1 line was extended in 2006, and Klinik Floridsdorf opened in 2019. The district balances urbanization with village character and recreational areas like Donauinsel and the Wasserpark.

== Demographics ==
=== Population growth ===
Floridsdorf’s population has shown steady long-term growth with periods of rapid increase. In 1869, the area (then still outside Vienna) had just over 12,000 inhabitants. Industrialization and the 1905 incorporation into Vienna spurred a population boom: by 1910 Floridsdorf reached 62,154 residents – more than five times the 1869 figure. After World War I, growth slowed as the district remained less densely built-up than inner-city districts. The Nazi-era split in 1938 reduced Floridsdorf’s population, and WWII caused a temporary decline. By 1951, the district (in its reduced borders) was home to around 85,000 people. Thereafter, new housing projects led to continuous increases. Floridsdorf’s population crossed 100,000 in the 1960s and 130,000 by the late 20th century.

Since the 1990s, Floridsdorf has experienced another surge of construction and influx of residents. Between 2001 and 2011, the population jumped from about 128,000 to 144,000. This trend accelerated in the 2010s with large developments (Citygate, Neu Leopoldau, Donaufeld etc.). As of 1 January 2025, Floridsdorf’s population is 189,580, making it the third most populous Vienna district. The district grew by 50% in the first 25 years of the 21st century, an increase of over 63,000 people – one of the highest growth rates in the city. City forecasts project Floridsdorf will exceed 200,000 inhabitants before 2030. Despite this growth, population density (around 4,264 per km² in 2025) remains moderate by Vienna standards due to the district’s large open areas.

=== Population structure ===
Floridsdorf’s age distribution is broadly similar to Vienna’s average, with a slight tilt toward families and older residents. The district traditionally had a somewhat higher proportion of children and senior citizens than the city core. In 2005, for example, 16.2% of Floridsdorf’s population was under 15 (vs 14.6% Vienna-wide), and 22.5% was over 60 (vs 22.0% citywide). The working-age group (15–59) was about 61%. More recently, with new housing attracting young families, the share of children and young adults has been rising. As of 2024, out of ~186,000 residents, roughly 19,900 (11%) were ages 10–19 and 21,131 (11.4%) were under age 10. Around 16% of residents are 65 or older. The gender ratio is about 48% male to 52% female, reflecting women’s longer life expectancy (similar to the city overall).

=== Nationality and migration ===
Traditionally a working-class Austrian district, Floridsdorf had a lower share of foreign-born residents than inner districts. In 2001, about 15.4% of residents were born outside Austria. The largest immigrant groups at that time were from the former Yugoslavia (especially Serbia and Montenegro, 2.3% of the population) and Turkey (1.2%). Only 11% of residents in 2006 were foreign nationals (vs ~19% for Vienna overall). However, the 21st-century population growth has come partly from immigration and newcomers from other districts. By 2024, approximately 30.7% of Floridsdorf inhabitants were not Austrian citizens (this includes 11.7% from other EU countries and ~19% from non-EU countries). Major communities include Serbian, Turkish, German, and Polish Austrians, alongside increasing numbers of European Union migrants (such as from Romania, Slovakia). The remaining ~69% are Austrian citizens.

In terms of language and ethnicity, German is the predominant language, but Floridsdorf's streets reflect diverse cultures. Serbian, Turkish, and Croatian are among the most common mother tongues after German, according to the 2001 census. The district's rapid expansion has also attracted many internal migrants from other parts of Vienna and Austria, contributing to a dynamic population mix.

=== Religion ===
Floridsdorf has historically been a predominantly Catholic district. Around the turn of the millennium, it had one of the highest proportions of Roman Catholics in Vienna: 53.9% in the 2001 census, compared to the city average of 49.2%. The district is served by numerous Catholic parishes and is organized as the City Deanery 21 of the Archdiocese of Vienna.

Since 1979, Floridsdorf has also been home to Vienna's largest mosque, the Vienna Islamic Centre, reflecting the growing Muslim community. As of 2001, about 4.9% of residents were Muslims and 3.0% Orthodox Christians. Protestants made up roughly 4.4%. Notably, Floridsdorf had the highest share of people stating no religious affiliation in Vienna: 28.9% in 2001, a figure that likely increased in subsequent years.

Today, the religious landscape is diverse; alongside Catholic churches, such as St. Leopold in Donaufeld and the baroque church of Stammersdorf, there are several Orthodox congregations, a Buddhist center, and the Islamic Centre with its prominent minaret.

== Geography ==
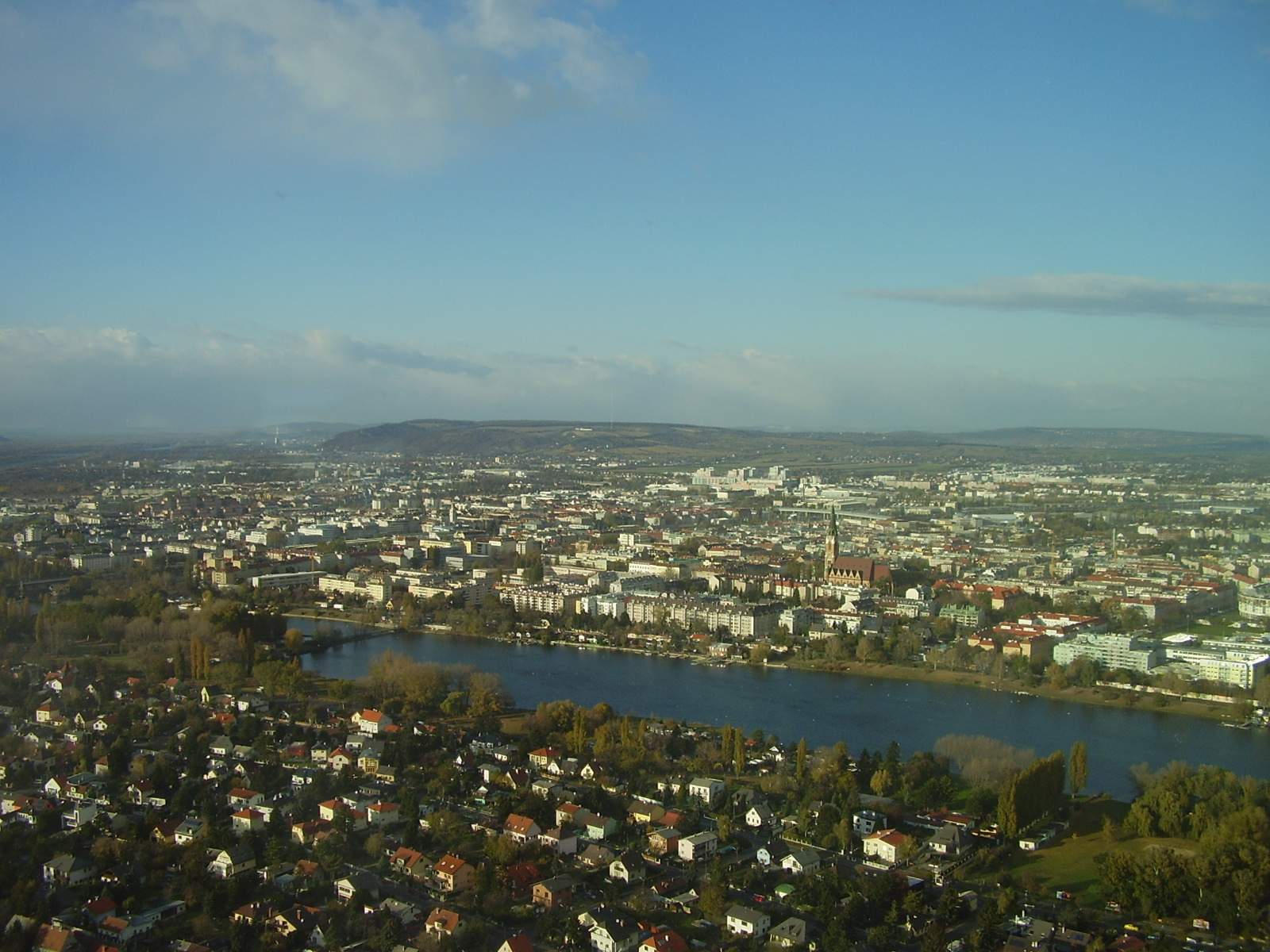
View from the Donauturm tower over Floridsdorf.

=== Topography ===
North Floridsdorf is dominated by the southern foothills of Bisamberg. Since the summit of the Bisamberg hill, at 358 metres (1,175 ft), is today in Lower Austria, Floridsdorf's highest elevation is the Falkenberg, at 320 metres (1,050 ft).

The Danube marks Floridsdorf's southwestern border. Part of the New Danube and a section of the Danube Island fall within the district, while the wetlands immediately beyond form part of Döbling. Bridges spanning the Danube to Floridsdorf (listed by the Danube's direction of flow) include the Jedlesee bridge, the Vienna North Bridge, the Floridsdorf Bridge, the U6-Danube Bridge and the Brigittenauer Bridge. The northern section of the Old Danube flows through Floridsdorf. In 1992, the Marchfeld Canal, which crosses the district, was put into operation.

=== Sub-districts ===
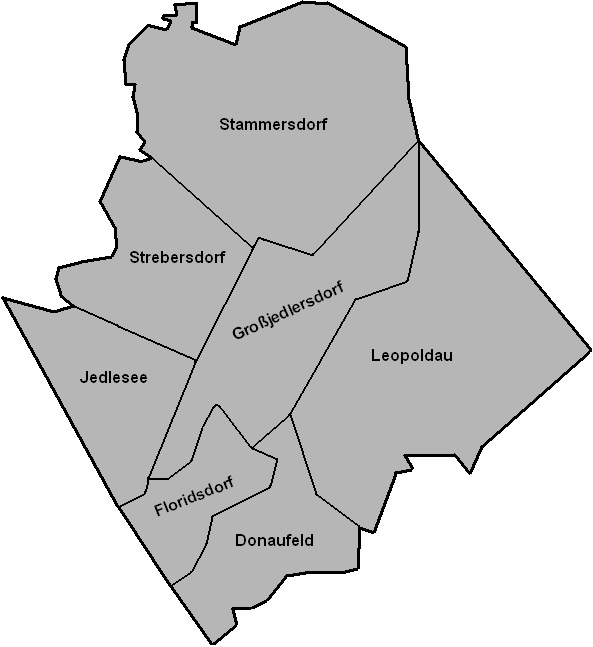
Floridsdorf's sub-districts

Floridsdorf comprises seven formerly independent communities: Floridsdorf, Donaufeld, Greater Jedlersdorf, Jedlesee, Leopoldau, Stammersdorf, and Strebersdorf, plus portions of two others.

The eponymous Floridsdorf sub-district is also the smallest in area. The largest is Stammersdorf, to the north. Stammersdorf borders Strebersdorf and Großjedlersdorf, consisting of the two communities Großjedlersdorf I and II. To the east, on the border of the 22nd district, are Leopoldau and Donaufeld. Jedlesee in the west is composed of Jedlesee and Schwarze Lackenau. In addition to these full sub-districts, Floridsdorf also contains parts of Kagran and Kaisermühlen, the greater portions of which lie in the district of Donaustadt.

=== Census districts ===
Floridsdorf is also divided into 28 census districts. Although their names are identical or nearly identical to the corresponding sub-districts, the census districts of Donaufeld, Greater Jedlersdorf, Old Jedlesee, New Jedlesee, Leopoldau, Schwarzlackenau, Stammersdorf and Strebersdorf have distinct borders. Settlements and parcels of land have given their names to the census districts of Hirschfeld, Nordrandsiedlung, Großfeldsiedlung, Schottenfeld, Siemensstrasse, Jochberg, Donaufelder Gartnergebiet, Mühlschüttel, Bruckhaufen and Industriegelande Bahndreieck. The district of Autokader takes its name from the largest auto plant of the Habsburg monarchy (Austro-Fiat), while Gaswerk Leopoldau is named for the city gas works, opened in 1911. The remaining Floridsdorf census districts are named after streets: Stammersdorf-Brünner Straße, Leopoldauer Straße-Siemensstraße, Strebersdorf-Pragerstraße, Koloniestraße, Shuttleworthstraße, Floridsdorf-Brünnerstraße, Floridsdorf-Am Spitz und Donaufeld-Leopoldauer Straße.

== Population ==
Population Growth
Data from Statistik Austria

=== Population development ===
Today's 21st district includes that area of Floridsdorf which, in 1869, along with its villages, had only 12,022 inhabitants. With the city limits located near Vienna, the population increased rapidly and showed, up to the First World War, very high growth rates. In 1910, Floridsdorf already had 62,154 inhabitants, its population since 1869 having more than quintupled. Since Floridsdorf after the First World War had a comparatively low population density compared to other districts, the local population rose more gradually. Apart from a brief decline around the Second World War, Floridsdorf's population has grown continuously, but with a significant fall from the 1990s on. At the beginning of 2007, there were 137,186 inhabitants - the third largest population among the Vienna districts. In terms of population density, Floridsdorf ranks only in the bottom quarter of the 23 Vienna municipalities, with 3,086 inhabitants per km^{2}.

=== Population structure ===
The population of Floridsdorf comprised, as of 2005, significantly more children, but also a slightly higher proportion of adults over 60, than the Vienna average. The number of children under 15 was 16.2% higher than for Vienna overall (14.6%). The proportion of the population aged 15 to 59 was 61.4% (Vienna: 63.4%), well below the mean, while the 20 to 34 age group showed a decrease. The proportion of inhabitants aged 60 or older was 22.5% (Vienna: 22.0%) slightly above the Vienna average. The gender distribution as of 2001 was 47.3% men and 52.7% women, the number of married people making up 43.0% compared to 41.2% in Vienna as a whole.

=== Language and nationality ===
The proportion of foreign residents in Floridsdorf as of 2006 was 11% (Vienna citywide: 19.1%), ranking fourth among the Vienna municipalities. In line with the country as a whole, growth of the foreign population in 2001 was 7.8%. The highest proportion of foreign residents in the district as of 2005, at 2.3%, was represented by Serbian and Montenegrin nationals. Another 1.2% were Turkish, 0.9% Polish and 0.6% German citizens. In 2001, a total of 15.4% of the district population was Austrian-born. Nearly 3.0% gave as their native language Serbian, 2.3% Turkish and 1.1% Croatian.

=== Religion ===
Floridsdorf has, with 53.9%, one of the highest populations of Roman Catholics in Vienna (Vienna citywide: 49.2%). There are 16 districts with Roman Catholic parishes, forming the City Deanery 21 (Archdiocese of Vienna). By contrast, the proportion of Muslims is 4.9% and Orthodox 3.0%. The proportion of Protestant residents stood at 4.4% in Vienna overall. 28.9% of the district's population as of 2001 professed no membership of a religious community, this being the highest such value within the Vienna municipality. A Further 4.9% of the population gave no religion or other confession.

=== Population centers ===
The District Office and the centre of Floridsdorf are located round Am Spitz, at the junction of Prager Straße (Prague Street) and Brünner Straße (Brno Street).

Parts of Floridsdorf were formerly villages, among which, for example, number Stammersdorf, Strebersdorf, and Leopoldau. Because of these sub-districts' origin as villages, Floridsdorf is characteristically rural, with most Heuriger taverns selling homegrown wine.

== Politics ==
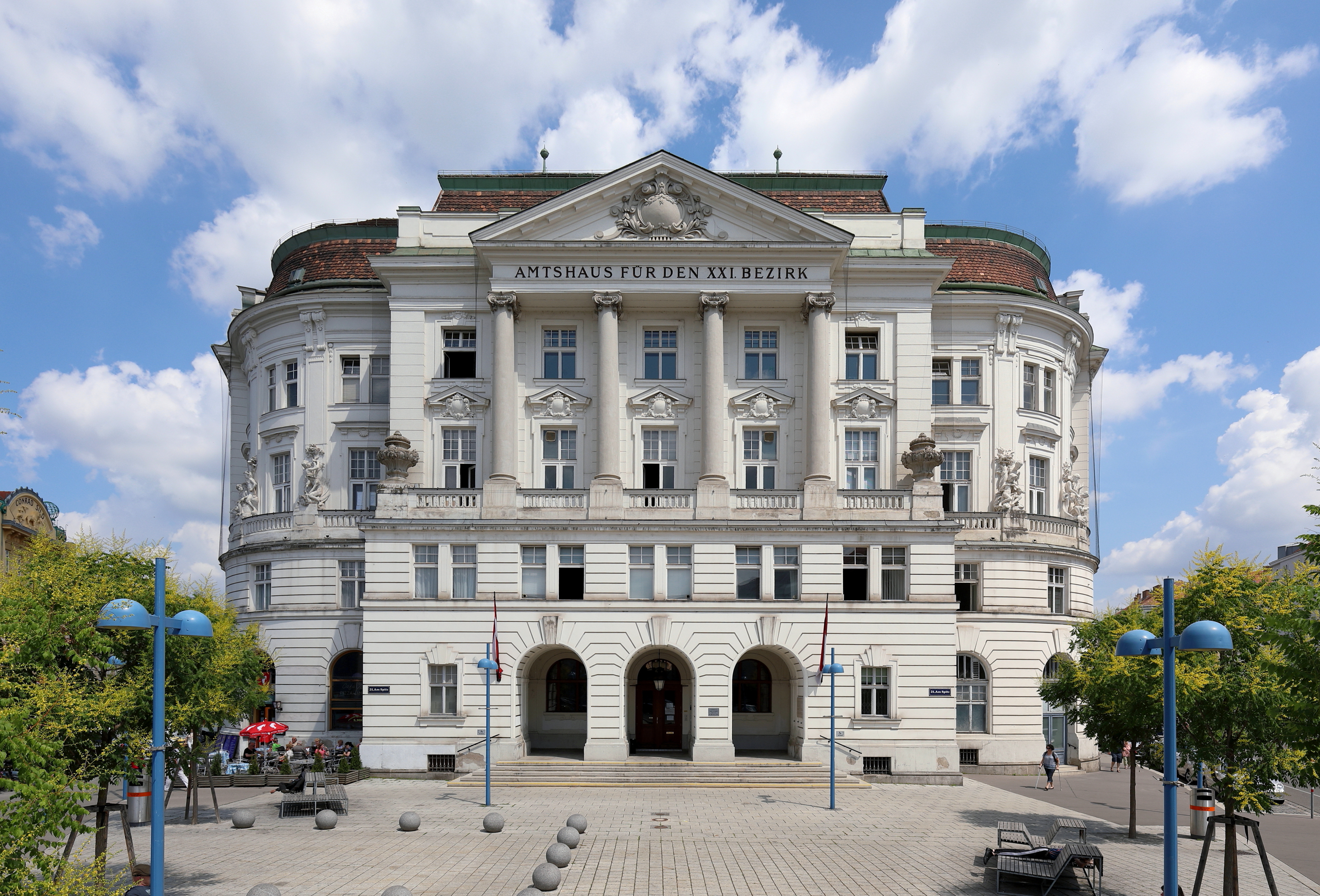
Floridsdorf Town Hall.

Bezirksvorsteher (political district heads), from 1945
Franz Koch (SPÖ)	1945–1946
Franz Jonas (SPÖ)	1946–1948
Ernst Theumer (SPÖ)	1948–1959
Rudolf Hitzinger (SPÖ)	1959–1964
Otmar Emerling (SPÖ)	1964–1980
Kurt Landsmann (SPÖ)	1980–1994
Heinz Lehner (SPÖ)	1994–2014
Georg Papai (SPÖ)	2014-

== Crest (coat of arms) ==
The six panels of the Floridsdorf coat of arms comprise the crests of the previously independent municipalities Floridsdorf, Greater Jedlersdorf, Jedlesee, Leopoldau, Stammer, and Strebersdorf.

Floridsdorf crest (coat of arms)

These six divisions of the Floridsdorf crest may be described as follows:

- Floridsdorf: The coat of arms (center panel) shows a vase with three red flowers on green stalks between eight green leaves on a silver background.
- Leopoldau: The upper-left coat of arms is a brown-clad right arm, five golden ears of grain, on a blue background.
- Stammersdorf: The top-right coat of arms shows a deciduous tree and three coniferous trees on a green lawn, silver background.
- Jedlesee: The bottom-left coat of arms is the haloed image of the Virgin Mary of Loretto, dressed in gold, laced with pearls and precious stones, shown with the child Jesus and flanked by the red letters M and L, for "Maria Loretto" on a silver background.
- Strebersdorf: The bottom-right coat of arms shows a red-roofed guard tower with two round window openings and two red flags with a golden knob on the ridge in a green field with a blue background.
- Greater Jedlersdorf: The bottom-middle coat of arms shows two crossed white sacks on a red background.

== Notable residents ==
- Anna Maria Erdődy
- Hannes Androsch
- Marko Arnautović
- Louis Black
- Andy Borg
- Franz Jonas
- Karl Markovics
- Hermann Nitsch
- Peter Pacult
- Erika Pluhar

== Important buildings ==
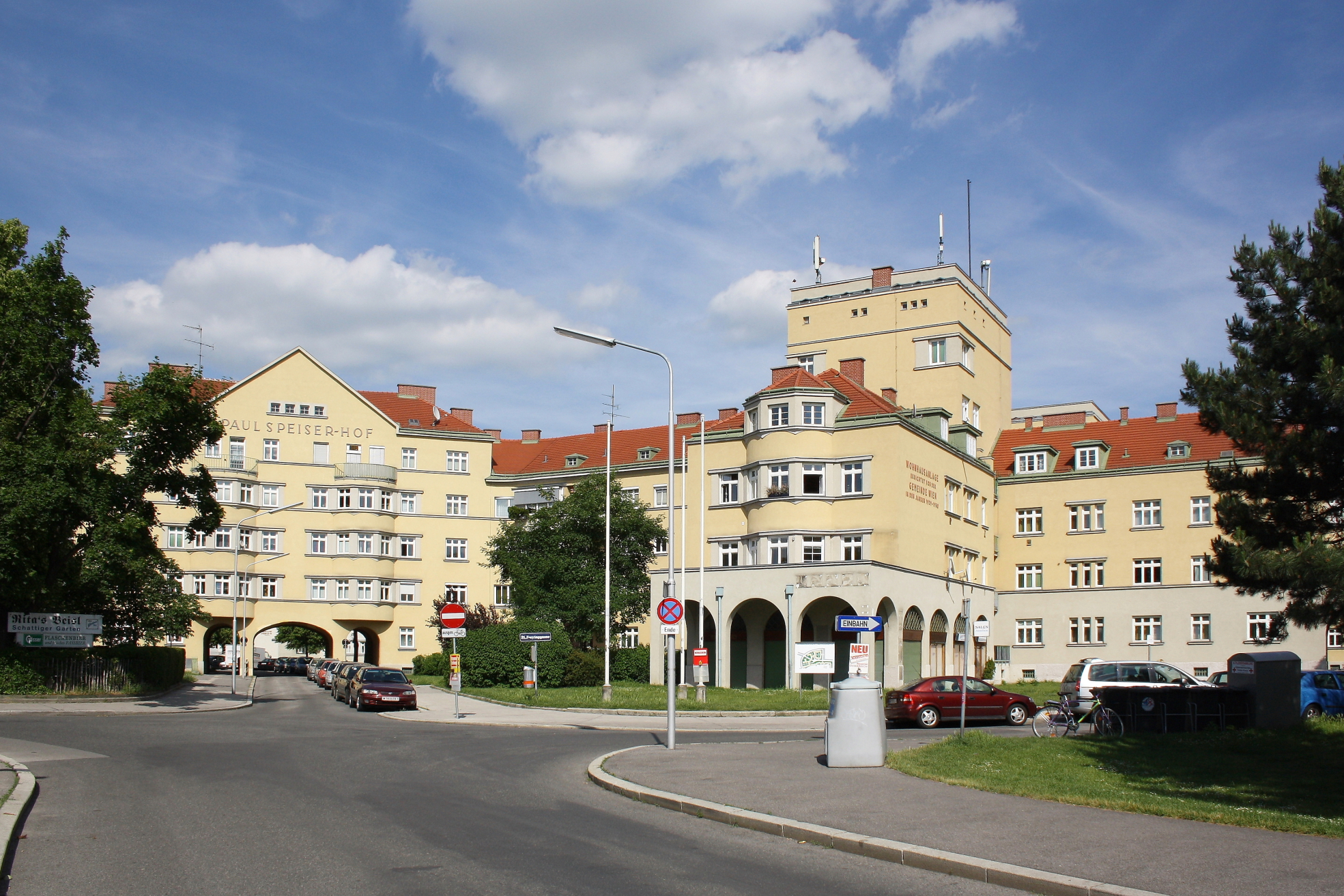
Paul-Speiser-Hof

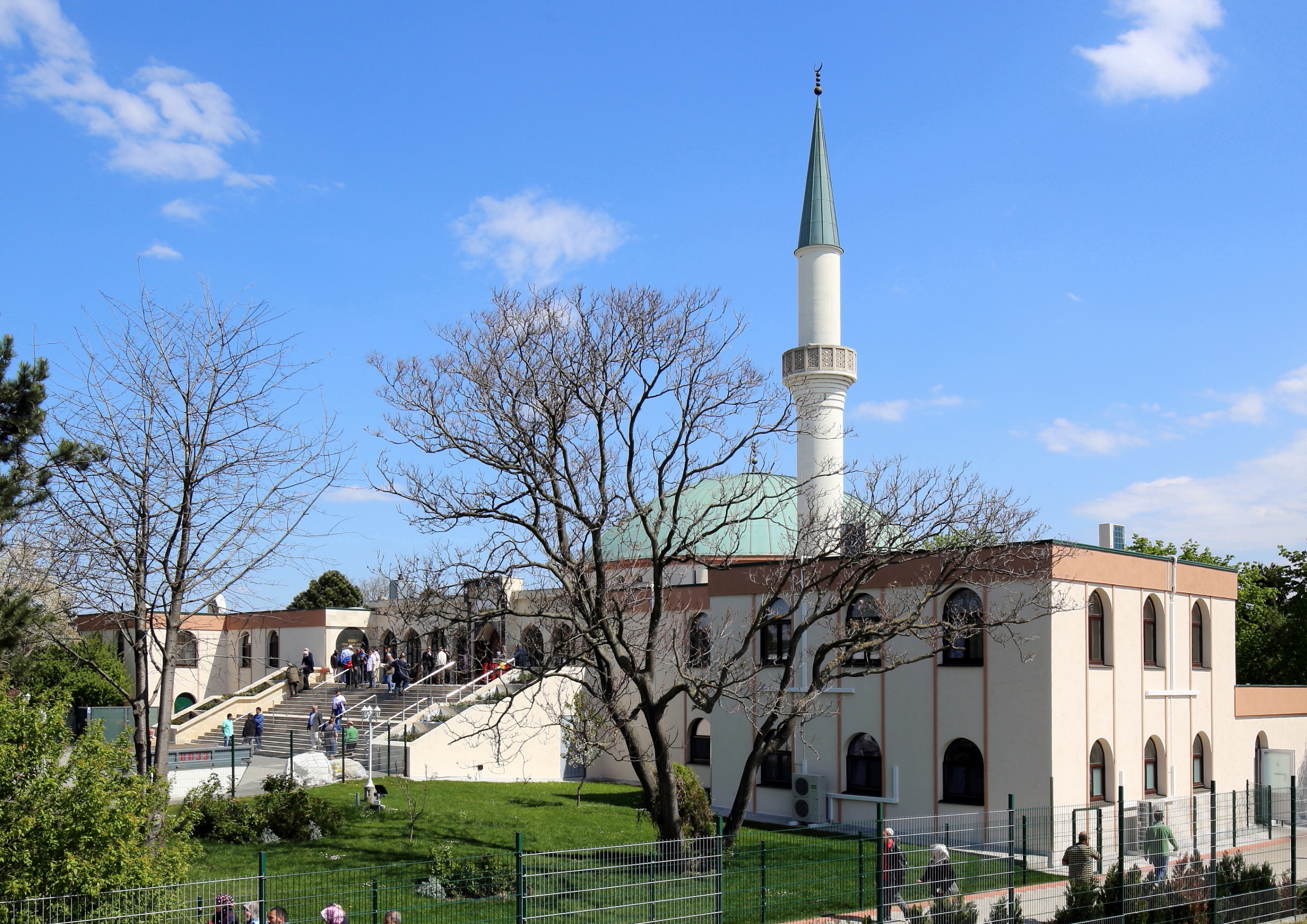
The mosque at Vienna Islamic Center in Floridsdorf.

- Many suburban settlements with gardens
- Numerous large settlements
  - Großfeldsiedlung
  - Nordrandsiedlung
  - Siedlung Jedlesee
  - Bruckhaufen
  - Neu-Stammersdorf
  - Schlingerhof
  - Karl-Seitz-Hof
  - Rosa-Weber-Hof
  - Paul-Speiser-Hof
  - Franz-Koch-Hof (ugs. Klein-Manhattan)
- Schools and other educational institutions
  - Religious School of Education campus in Vienna Vienna - Strebersdorf (including practice and practice Volksschule Hauptschule - Cooperative Middle School)
  - Vocational school for automotive technology, plumbing and Karosseure
  - Special school for severely handicapped children
  - Higher College for Tourism
  - Higher College for Economic Occupations
  - School of Animal Care Fund for the Promotion of Animal Training
  - School brothers Strebersdorf
  - Federal High School and Franklin Street Bundesrealgymnasium 21
  - Federal and Federal School Gymnasium Franklin Straße 26
  - Federal and Federal School Gymnasium Ödenburgerstraße
  - Federal and Federal School Gymnasium "Bertha von Suttner", training ship
  - Federal and Federal School Gymnasium "Ella Lingens Gymnasium" (formerly: Gerasdorf Street)
  - University of Vienna - Business Center (BWZ)
  - University of Veterinary Medicine Vienna
  - Volkshochschule Floridsdorf
- Churches
  - Church of the Order of Friars School Strebersdorf (Jean Baptiste de La Salle)
  - Pfarrkirche Queen Mary (Strebersdorf)
  - Donaufeld parish church
  - Floridsdorfer St. Jakob
  - Großjedlersdorfer Parish Church of St. Charles Borromeo (small pilgrimage church Maria Taferl)
  - San Marco Polo Square
  - Pastoral station of St. Michael
  - Maria Loretto Church (Jedlesee)
  - Pfarrkirche Gartenstadt
- Social Floridsdorf Medical Center - Hospital and Geriatric Center

== Arts and Culture ==
=== Sights ===
- Beethoven Memorial and Erdödy Mansion, Jedlesee
- The Beethoven Way (Beethovenweg)
- Pfarrkirche Donaufeld (The bulky neo-early brick is the third highest church in Vienna and was, before the incorporation of Floridsdorf, planned to be the "Dom Niederösterreichs", the Cathedral of Lower Austria.)
- The Vienna Danube Island
- The Old Danube

=== Museums ===
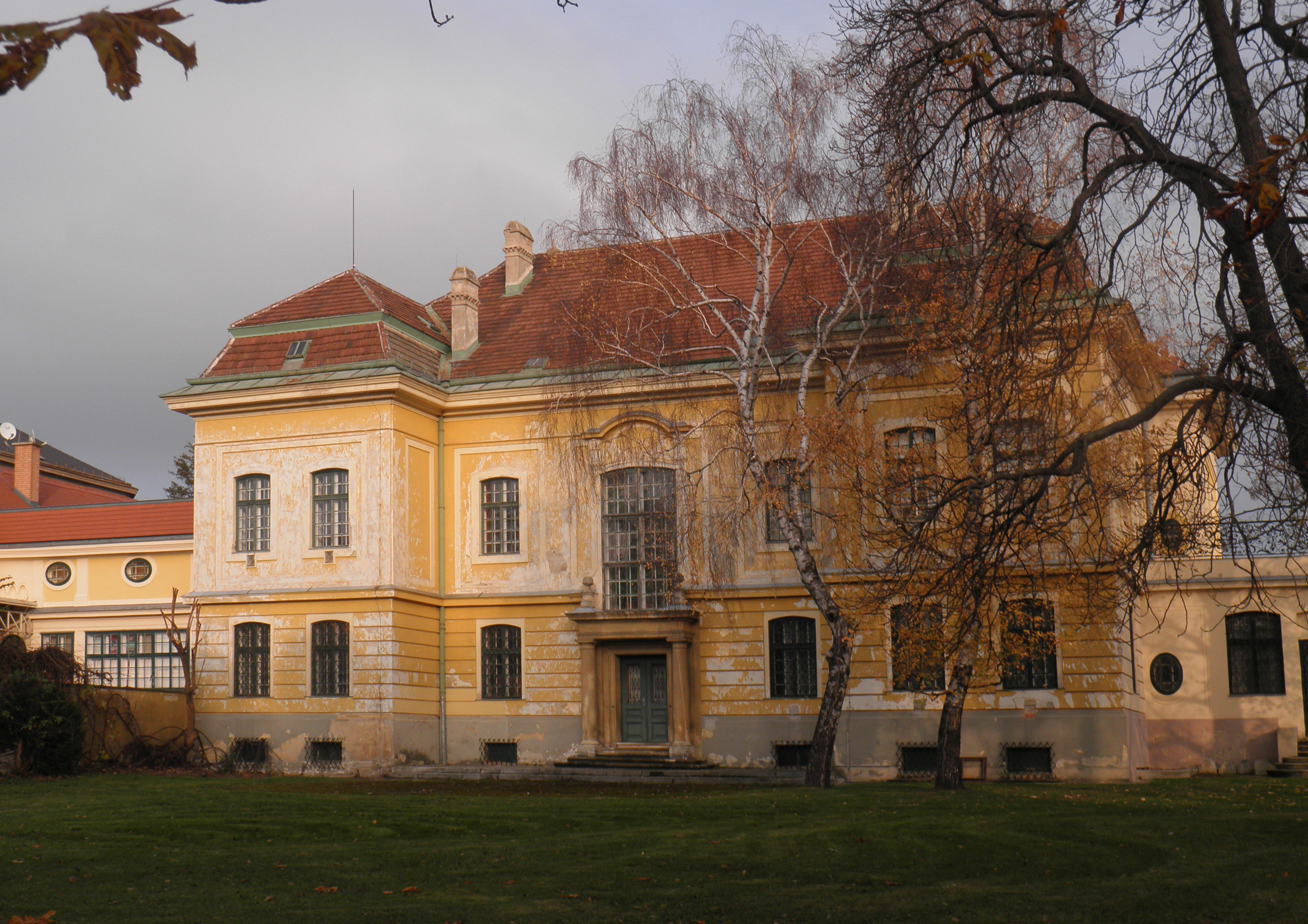
Mautner Schlössl, housing the District Museum, Floridsdorf

The Museum of Local History, now known as the District Museum, founded in 1960 in the Floridsdorf Mautner Schlössl (Prague Street) building, is devoted principally to the emergence of the Danube landscape, the beginning of steam navigation, railway history, and the history of some of the more ancient places in the area. The Museum of Harness and Saddlery, Horseshoes and Veterinary Orthopedics, closed in 2014, but pertaining to everything equine, housed a collection of bone specimens, saddles, horse and beef dishes and an exhibit on the development of horseshoeing from the Romans to the present day. The Vienna Fisheries Museum presents its visitors with information on local fishing through the ages, featuring an exhibition of rare specimens of native fish, aquariums, ancient writings and exhibits, fishing gear and fish-eating animals. In Jedlesee, at the former estate of Countess Anna Maria Erdődy, a memorial to Ludwig van Beethoven was established.

=== Choirs ===
The choral group Harmony (exact name: Floridsdorfer Chorvereinigung "Harmony 1865"; founded: 1865) is a mixed choir, consisting of an average of 40 members. It gives regular performances, for example during Festival-week and Christmas, always with a program appropriate to the season. The choir makes occasional concert tours: to Kraków most recently, also to Rome and Tuscany.

=== Twin municipalities ===
- (Hungary) Angyalföld
- (Japan) Katsushika

=== Sports clubs ===
- Floridsdorfer AC
- Austrian gymnastics and sports Union Donaufeld
- Leopoldau Sports Union

== Research and innovation ==
Floridsdorf, the 21st district of Vienna, has evolved from an industrial hub to a center for innovation and research. Historically home to locomotive and aircraft manufacturing, the district today hosts universities, research institutes, and companies working across life sciences, engineering, digital technologies, and energy.

=== Life Sciences and Healthcare ===
Floridsdorf is home to the University of Veterinary Medicine Vienna (Vetmeduni Vienna), Austria’s only veterinary university, known for research in animal health, zoonoses, and food safety. The Klinik Floridsdorf, opened in 2019, is one of Europe’s most modern hospitals and hosts the Karl Landsteiner Institute for Lung Research, focusing on treatments for pulmonary diseases such as COPD and lung cancer.

=== Engineering and Advanced Manufacturing ===
Historically, Floridsdorf was a key site for locomotive production at the Floridsdorf Locomotive Factory, active from 1869 to 1969, and military aircraft manufacturing by Lohner-Werke during World War I. Today, Siemens Austria operates its headquarters, “Siemens City,” featuring sustainable building design and R&D divisions in automation and mobility. Local firms like Lunatone contribute to innovation in industrial electronics.

=== Information Technology and Software ===
Floridsdorf hosts IT giants such as Atos and A1 Telekom, which operates a major data center opened in 2018 in partnership with IBM. The area benefits from Vienna’s digital infrastructure expansion, supporting startups and cybersecurity R&D. The Austrian Institute of Technology (AIT), headquartered in Floridsdorf since 2018, contributes significantly to digital safety, AI, and software research.

=== Environmental and Energy Technologies ===
Floridsdorf supports several green innovation projects. Siemens City uses geothermal energy and solar heating, while the ENERGYbase building, completed in 2008, was Vienna’s first passive office complex. Floridsdorf also hosted Vienna’s first urban wind turbine and the city’s earliest wind energy plant. The AIT Center for Energy conducts cutting-edge research in smart grids, energy storage, and e-mobility.

=== Transportation and Mobility ===
Floridsdorf has a long history in mobility innovation, from the launch of Austria’s first railway in 1837 to Lohner’s early electric cars and aircraft. Today, the district houses the Rail Tec Arsenal Climate Wind Tunnel, one of the world’s most advanced facilities for testing vehicles under extreme weather. Siemens Mobility and Wiener Linien use the district for R&D and testing of modern tram and transport systems.

=== Education and Public Research Institutions ===
Floridsdorf hosts several key academic institutions, including Vetmeduni and a satellite campus of the University of Applied Sciences Technikum Wien, focusing on renewable energy and mechatronics. The AIT headquarters consolidates multiple research centers across mobility, health, digital safety, and innovation. These institutions form partnerships with industry and public agencies to support applied research and student training.

== See also ==
- Lokomotivfabrik Floridsdorf - locomotive works in Floridsdorf

== Sources ==
- "Wien - 21. Bezirk/Floridsdorf", Wien.gv.at, 2008, webpage (15 subpages): Wien.gv.at-floridsdorf.
- Felix Czeike: Wiener Bezirkskulturführer: XXI. Floridsdorf ("Vienna District Cultural Leader: XXI. Floridsdorf"). Jugend and Volk, Vienna 1979, ISBN 3-7141-6221-6.
- Raimund Hinkel, Kurt Landsmann, Robert Vrtala: Floridsdorf von A-Z. Der 21. Bezirk in 1.000 Stichworten ("Floridsdorf from A-Z: the 21st District in 1,000 words"). Brandstätter, Vienna 1997, ISBN 3-85447-724-4.
- Kurt Landsmann: Floridsdorf 1945: das Kriegsende. Ein Beitrag zur Zeitgeschichte ("Floridsdorf 1945: The War's End: A View of Time History"). Brandstätter Verlag, Vienna 1995, ISBN 3-85447-622-1.
- Carola Leitner (Hg.): Floridsdorf: Wiens 21. Bezirk in alten Fotografien ("Floridsdorf: Vienna's 21st District in Old Photographs"). Ueberreuter, Vienna 2006, ISBN 3-8000-7206-8.
- Peter Schubert: Jugendstil & Co: Hausschmuck in Floridsdorf 1880–1930 ("Houses in Floridsdorf 1880–1930"). Mayer, Klosterneuburg 2001, ISBN 3-901025-93-6.
