= U1 (Vienna U-Bahn) =

Metro line in Vienna

Line U1 U-Bahn-Linie U1
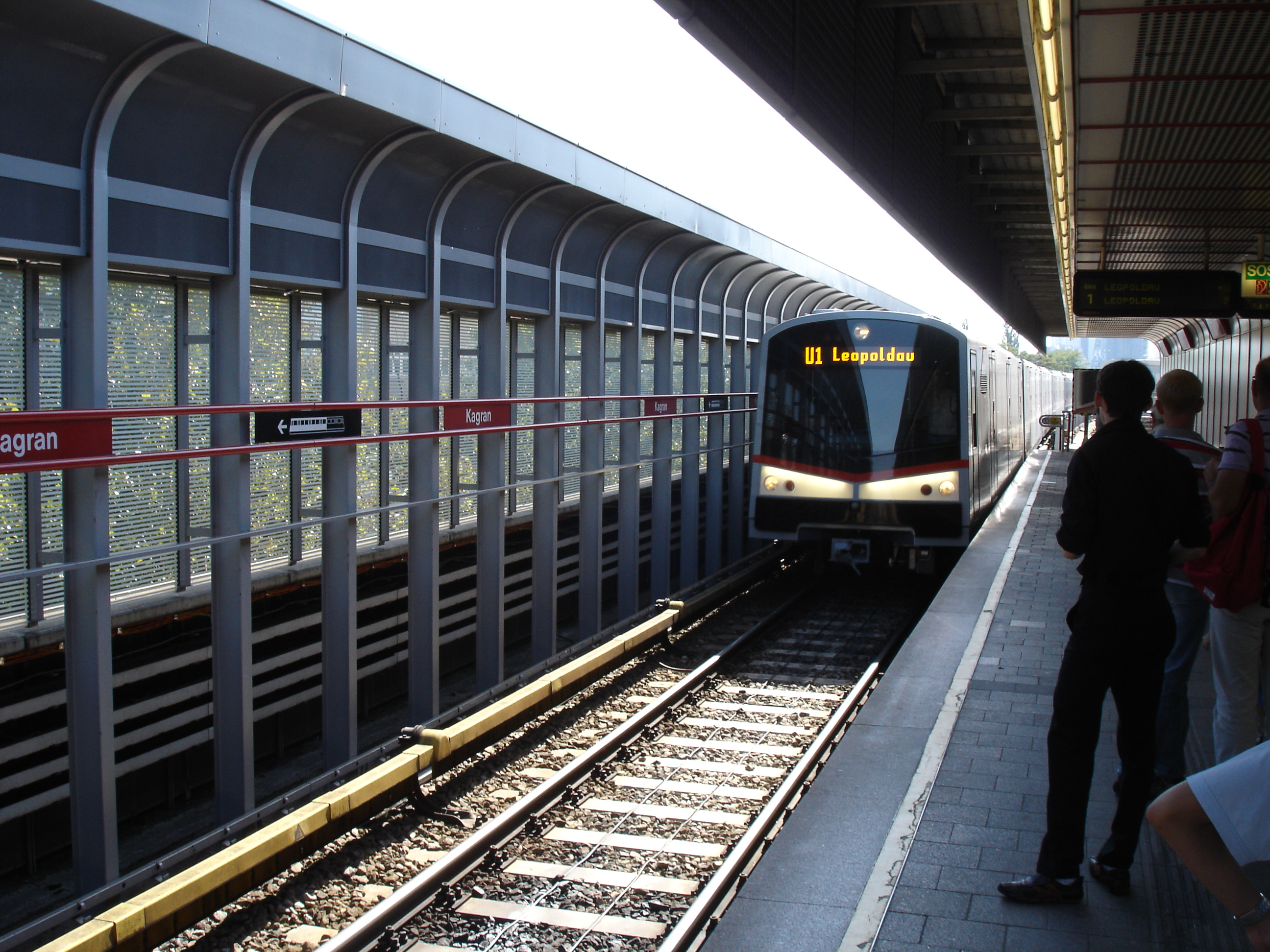
- Line U1 train at Kagran

Overview
- Status: Operational
- Termini: Oberlaa; Leopoldau
- Stations: 24

Service
- Type: Rapid transit
- System: Vienna U-Bahn
- Operator(s): Wiener Linien
- Depot(s): Kagran (closed 2006), Leopoldau, Neulaa

History
- Opened: 25 February 1978; 48 years ago
- Last extension: 2017

Technical
- Line length: 19.3 km (12.0 mi)
- Track gauge: 1,435 mm (4 ft 8 1/2 in) standard gauge
- Electrification: 750 V DC third rail

Line U1 is a line on the Vienna U-Bahn metro system. Opened in 1978, it currently has 24 stations and a total length of 19.3 km (12.0 mi), from Oberlaa to Leopoldau. When the extension to Oberlaa was completed in 2017, the line became the longest on the network, surpassing the length of U6.

The line is connected to U2 at Karlsplatz and Praterstern, U3 at Stephansplatz, U4 at Karlsplatz and Schwedenplatz.

== Stations ==
Line U1 currently serves the following stations:

- Oberlaa ( P+R park & ride facility)
- Neulaa ( P+R park & ride facility)
- Alaudagasse
- Altes Landgut
- Troststraße
- Reumannplatz
- Keplerplatz
- Südtiroler Platz-Hauptbahnhof (transfer to:)
- Taubstummengasse
- Karlsplatz (transfer to:)
- Stephansplatz (transfer to:)
- Schwedenplatz (transfer to:)
- Nestroyplatz
- Praterstern (transfer to:)
- Vorgartenstraße
- Donauinsel
- Kaisermühlen-VIC
- Alte Donau
- Kagran
- Kagraner Platz
- Rennbahnweg
- Aderklaaer Straße ( P+R park & ride facility)
- Großfeldsiedlung
- Leopoldau (transfer to: - P+R park & ride facility)

== History ==
=== Construction (1969-1982) ===
The construction of Vienna's modern urban railway network started on 3 November 1969. This consisted of the newly built U1 line, and two merged lines from a tram and old metro, of the line U2 and U4 respectively. As the result of a more streamlined network, there were new routes between U1, U2 and U4. The construction was launched in Karlsplatz, the largest interchange station in Vienna. On 25 February 1978, the first Vienna U-Bahn route between Karlsplatz and Reumannplatz, the U1, went into operation. By December 1981, all the sections of U1 originally included in the basic network (Reumannplatz - Stephansplatz - Praterstern, 6.1 kilometres in length) were into operation.

The extension of line U1 to Kagran, 3.9 km (2.4 mi) long, which was not part of the original plans and was added later when the Reichsbrücke over the Danube collapsed in 1976, was completed in September 1982. Finally, the Vienna U-Bahn basic network was completed on 3 September 1982 and the network reached a total length of 30 kilometres.

=== Expansion (2001-2017) ===
On 19 October 2001, the groundbreaking ceremony of the extension of U1 toward Leopoldau was held, for which the two districts of Donaustadt and Floridsdorf had been waiting for 20 years. After five years of construction, the 4.6 km (2.9 mi) long extension of the U1 was opened on 2 September 2006.

Planning for a fourth U-Bahn expansion phase began in 2001 and concrete ideas were put forth in the 2003 Transport Master Plan. As of 2007, these plans were including the extension of U1 from Reumannplatz to Rothneusiedl, with time horizon 2015. In March 2012, it was officially announced that the southern branch of U1 would be extended to Oberlaa and not the originally planned terminus Rothneusiedl. The aim of serving this latter neighborhood was achieved by expanding the pre-existing route of tramline 67. The change to the original plans was thought to be due cost issues or the incomplete development of the area surrounding Rothneusiedl. The extension was ultimately opened to the public on 2 September 2017, thereby expanding the Vienna metro network by 4.6 km (2.9 mi) and 5 stations. In the area of the station Alaudagasse preparations for a future line bifurcation were made, should the further development in Rothneusiedl warrant a branch line there.

== Rolling stock ==
The development of the cars of both the U1 and U2 Trains was by Simmering-Graz-Pauker (SGP) in 1972. This unit had a two-axle motorcar, it was 36.8 metres long and 2.8 metres wide and a permanently coupled twin railcar. A train was made up of three double cars. From 1987, SGP upgraded their cars' technical equipment, which included water-cooled three-phase motors, brakes with energy recovery and modernised emergency braking and safety equipment. In 2006, the U1 and U2 LED displays replaced the original in-and-out illuminated telltale displays. In addition, the trains were retrofitted with plastic seats, video surveillance and warning lights that had signalled the door closing. An individual car consists of 49 seats and 91 standing spots.
