= Leopoldau station =

Vienna U-Bahn station

Leopoldau
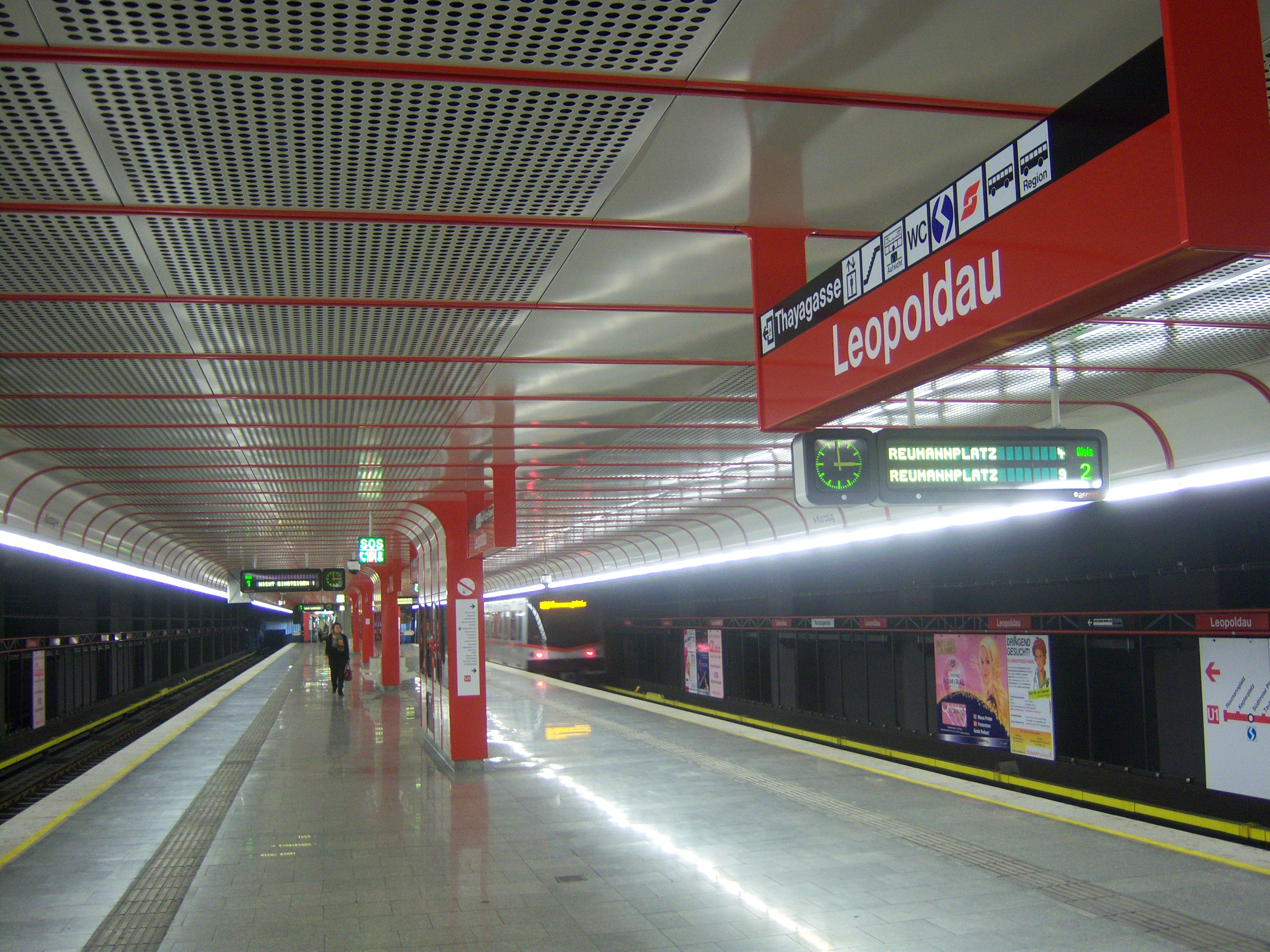

General information
- Location: Floridsdorf, Vienna; Austria
- Coordinates: 48.2775°N 16.4516°E
- Line: P+R 29A 32A 36B 510

History
- Opened: 2 September 2006

Services
Preceding station	Wiener Linien	Following station
Großfeldsiedlung toward Oberlaa	U1	Terminus
Location

Leopoldau is an end station of the U1 of the Vienna U-Bahn. It is located in the Floridsdorf District, underneath the Wien Leopoldau railway station, which is served by both regional and S-Bahn trains. The station opened in 2006.
