= Oberlaa station =

Vienna U-Bahn station

Oberlaa
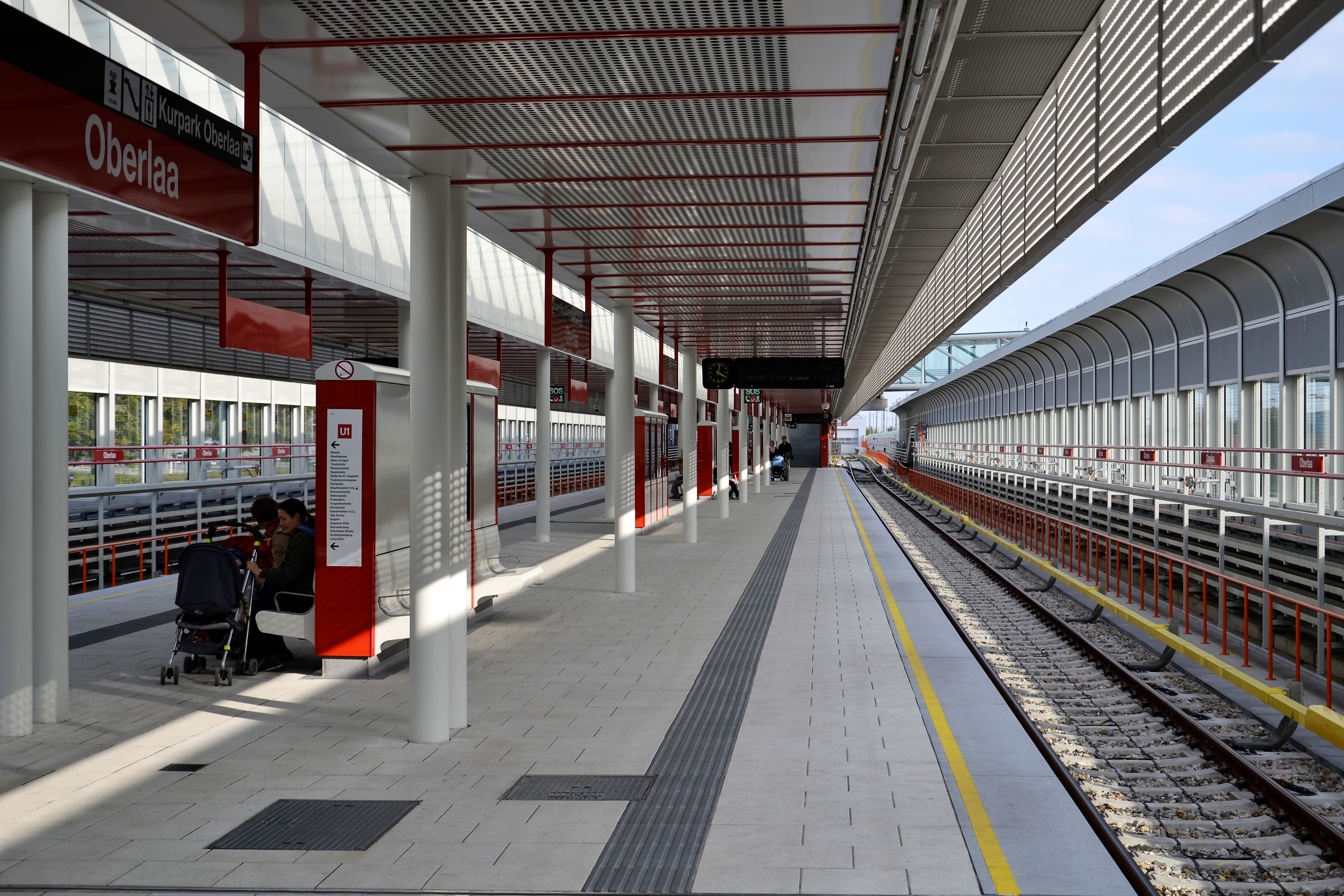

General information
- Location: Favoriten, Vienna; Austria
- Coordinates: 48.1423°N 16.4000°E
- Line: P+R

History
- Opened: 2 September 2017

Services
Preceding station	Wiener Linien	Following station
Terminus	U1	Neulaa toward Leopoldau
Location

Oberlaa is a station on Line U1 of the Vienna U-Bahn. Since September 2, 2017, it has been the new southern terminus of the U1, which had its terminus at Reumannplatz since 1978. Oberlaa station is located in the south of Vienna's 10th district directly at the entrance to the Therme Wien. To the north of the station is the Kurpark Oberlaa, to the south is the Donauländebahn; beyond the railway is the historical center of the district of Oberlaa.

The station's construction was part of the fourth expansion stage of the Vienna U-Bahn.

Before the opening of the extension of the U1, the eastern branch of the tram line 67, which had been built at the Vienna International Garden Exhibition in 1974, ended here. It was shortened to the Per-Albin-Hansson-Siedlung during the construction of the U-Bahn and closed with the opening of the extension.

In the area of the subway station, a storage and inspection hall for U1 trains and a park-and-ride facility for commuters from the surrounding area were built. Exits lead to Laaer-Berg-Strasse, Hämmerlgasse, Biererlgasse and Kurbadstraße.
