= Altes Landgut station =

Metro station in Vienna, Austria

Altes Landgut
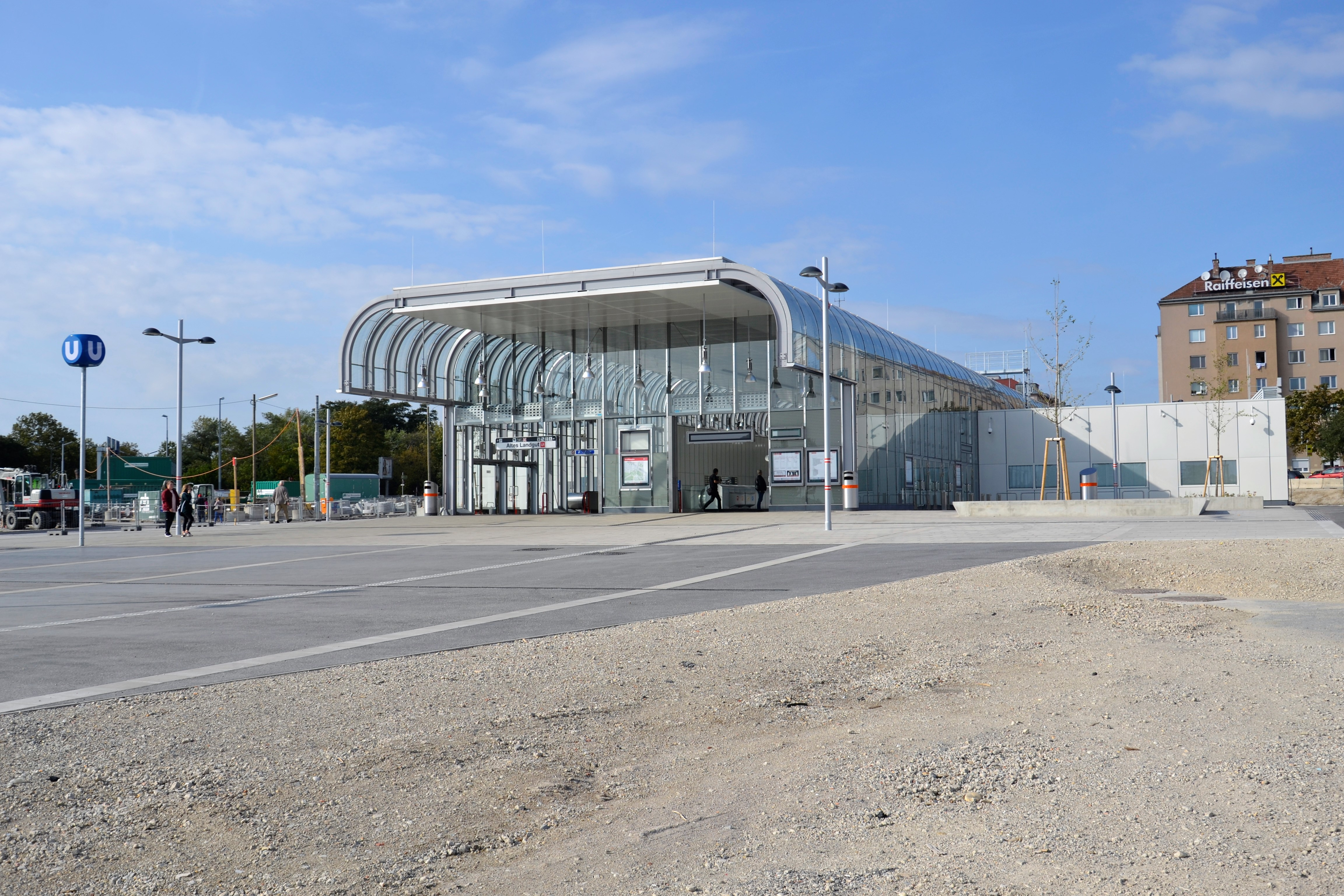

General information
- Location: Favoriten, Vienna; Austria
- Coordinates: 48.1623°N 16.3832°E

History
- Opened: 2 September 2017

Services
Preceding station	Wiener Linien	Following station
Alaudagasse toward Oberlaa	U1	Troststraße toward Leopoldau
Location

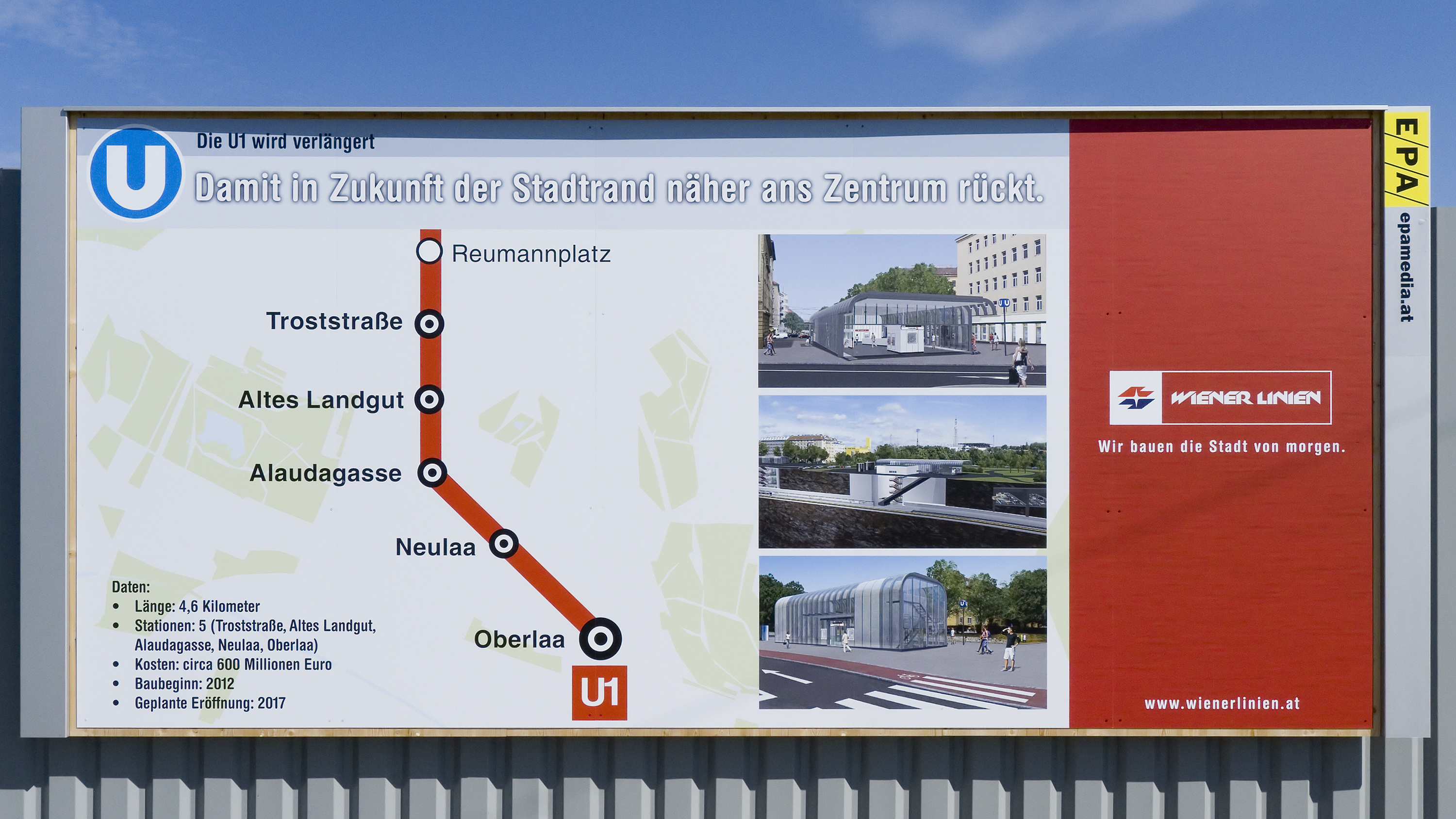
Information board for the southern extension of the U1

Altes Landgut is a station on Line U1 located in Favoriten, the 10th district of Vienna, Austria. The opening took place on September 2, 2017. It is part of the extension of the U1 from Reumannplatz to Oberlaa.

== Station conditions ==
The station Altes Landgut was built about 1.6 km south of the Reumannplatz in a low-lying area under the square called Altes Landgut, known in traffic announcements as Verteilerkreis Favoriten, and under the Favoritenstraße. The name comes from a restaurant on the northern slope of Laaer Berg that was demolished in 1900. Today's square is located on the top of the mountain, so it is, as far as sea level is concerned, the highest station on the U1 or the entire Vienna U-Bahn network.

The station serves the University of Applied Sciences Vienna Campus, in German FH Campus Wien, the football stadium Generali Arena, and the summer spa Laaerbergbad, all three of which are in the vicinity. Furthermore, you can change here (as before from the tram line 67) to the bus line 15A, which crosses the route of the U1 and connects Meidling (U4, U6) tangentially with Simmering (U3). The extent to which the station will be used for "Park & Ride" by motorists of the Südosttangente (A23) in the Laaerbergtunnel between the Altes Landgut and the subway line depends on the expansion of the parking lots near the station.

For this purpose, and for the planned construction of a new neighborhood around the subway station or the traffic circle, a press release by the Planning Department of the Vienna City Administration was published in the spring of 2014. At the end of 2015, project partner Asfinag announced that the construction of the new neighborhood would be postponed for several years for economic reasons.

== Design ==
On the distribution floor of the station, the walls of the escalator were provided with the large-format mural "face-tracking snails" (Gesichtsüberwachungsschnecken) by the Swiss computer artist Yves Netzhammer. The total of 63 stylized portraits are a tribute to the diversity of people and the monitoring by face recognition. They are depictions with many details. The drawings were applied to the metal plates by means of digital direct printing (DDP) and a special paint that uses light interference effects. This flip-flop lacquer causes the color to be perceived differently from different angles; the drawings therefore seem to change as you pass by on the escalator.

Also in the distribution floor is a small figure of Saint Barbara, the patron saint of miners.

== Gallery ==
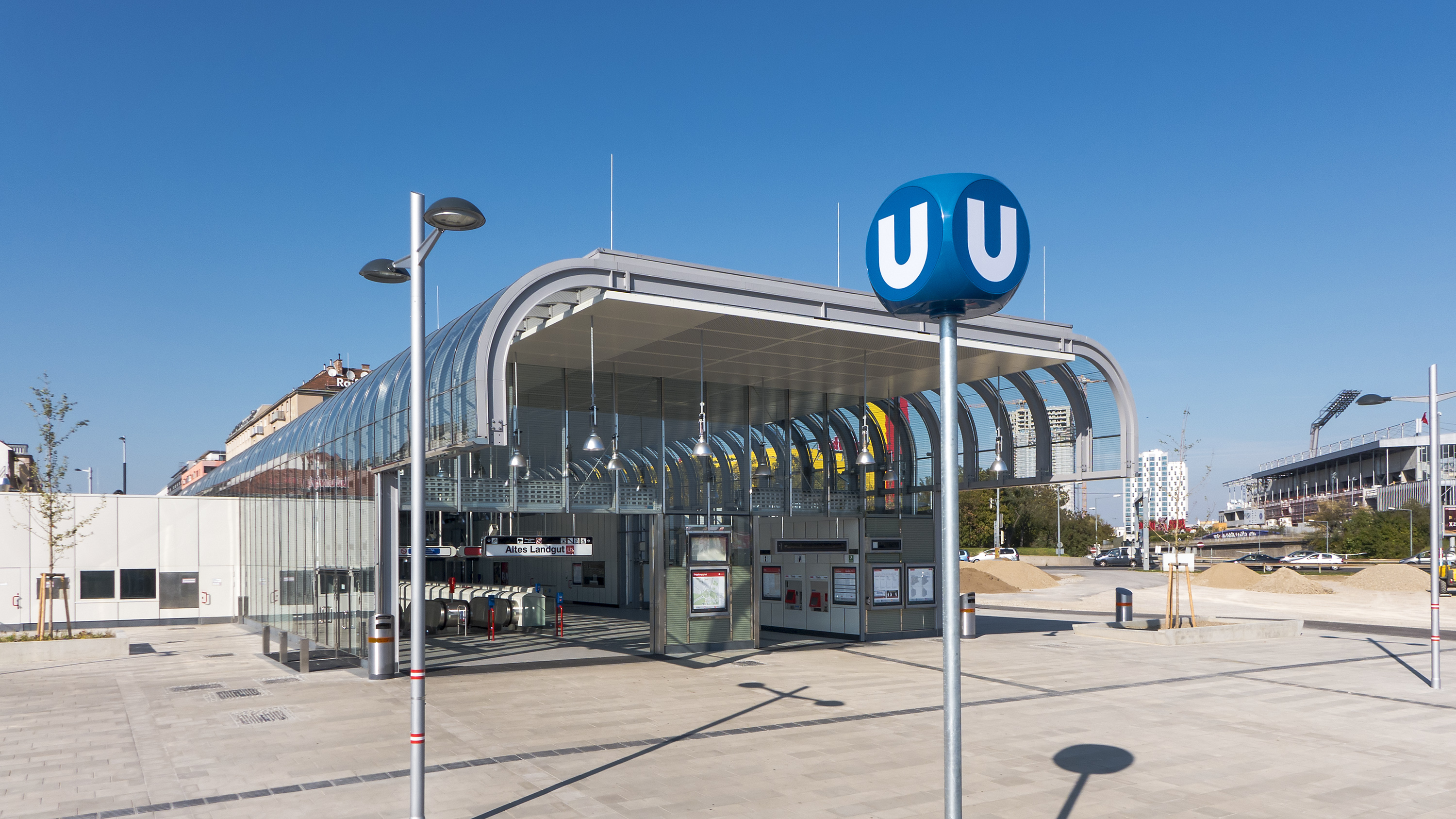
South entrance

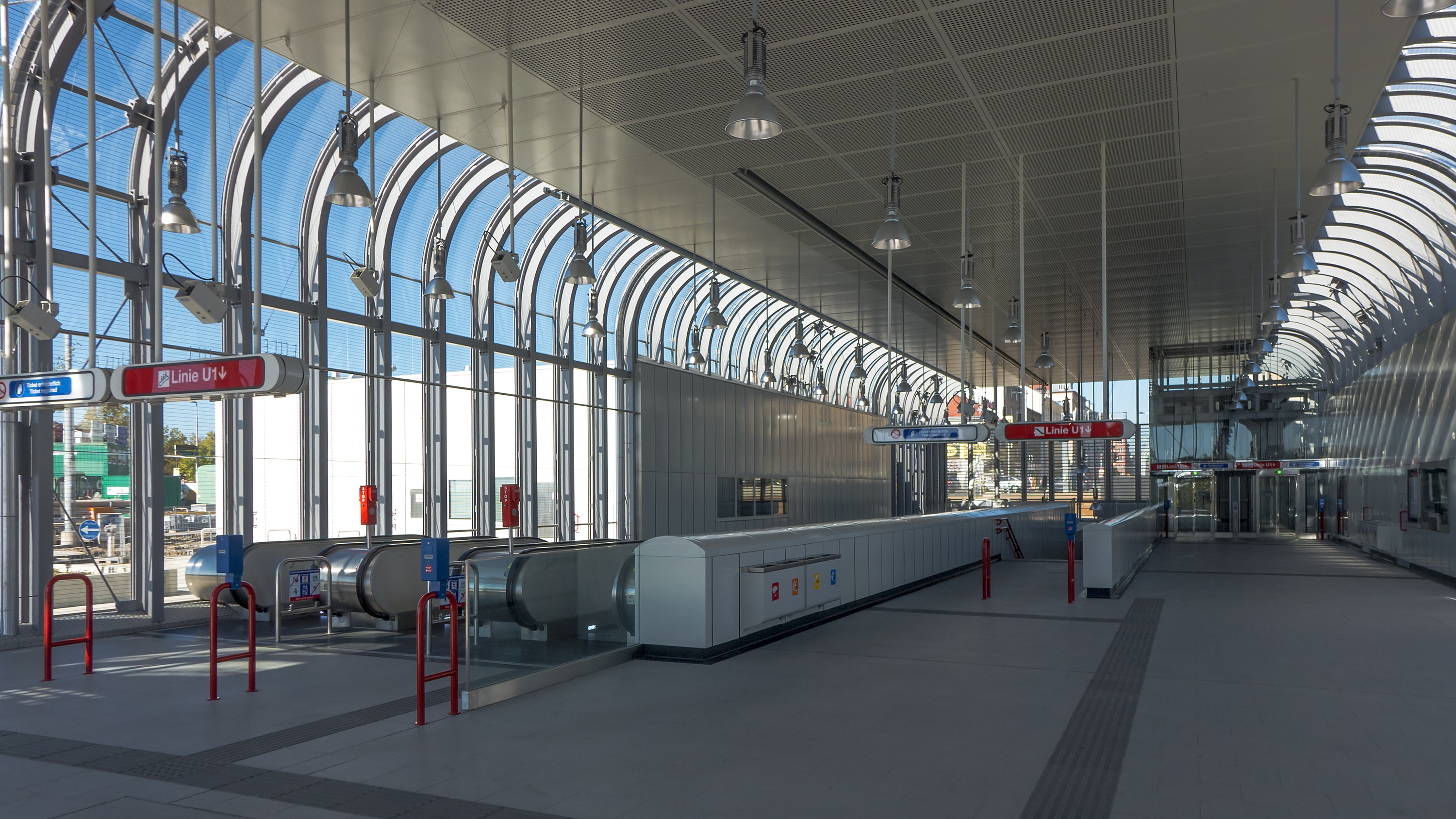
South entrance, interior

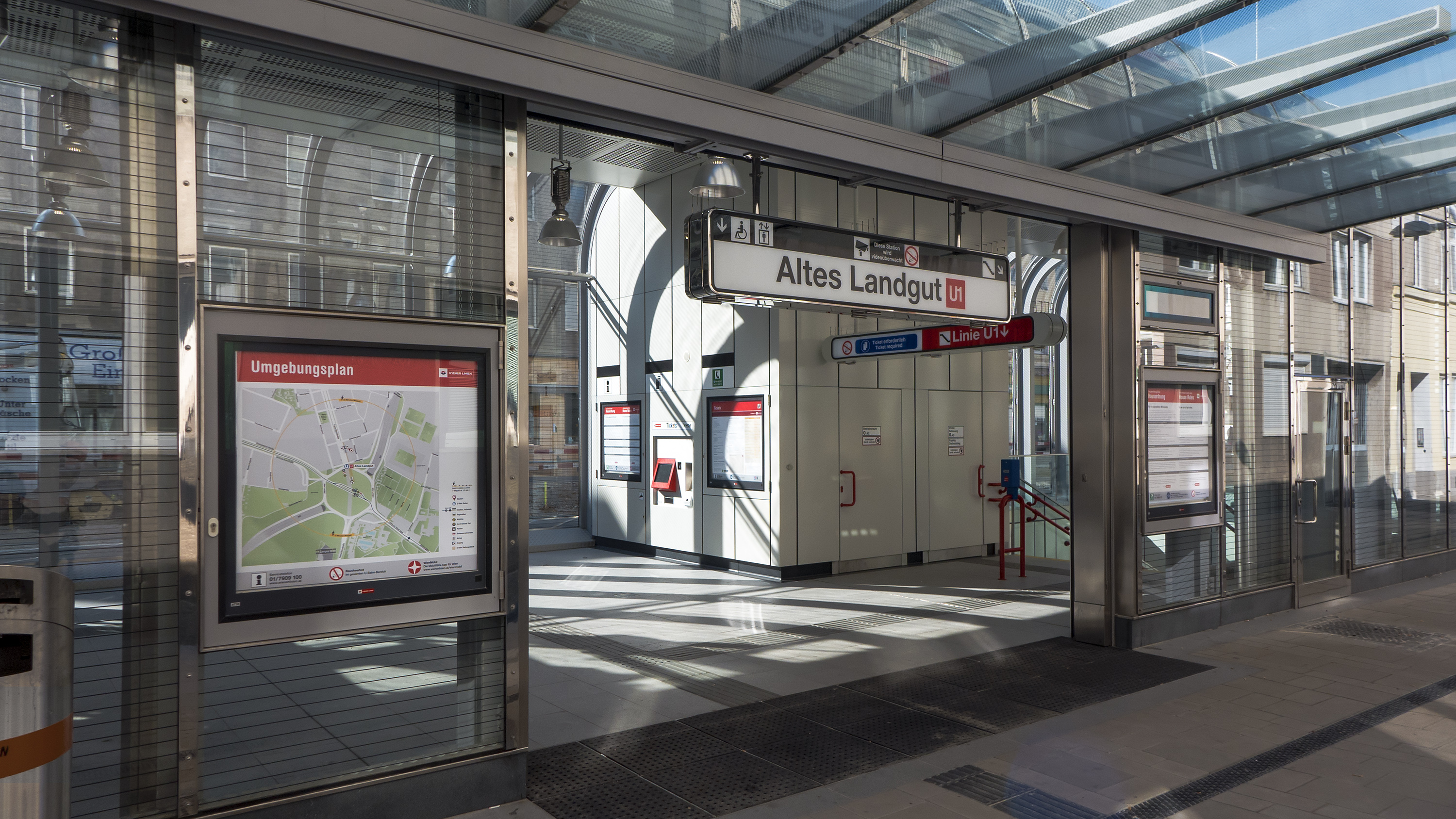
North entrance

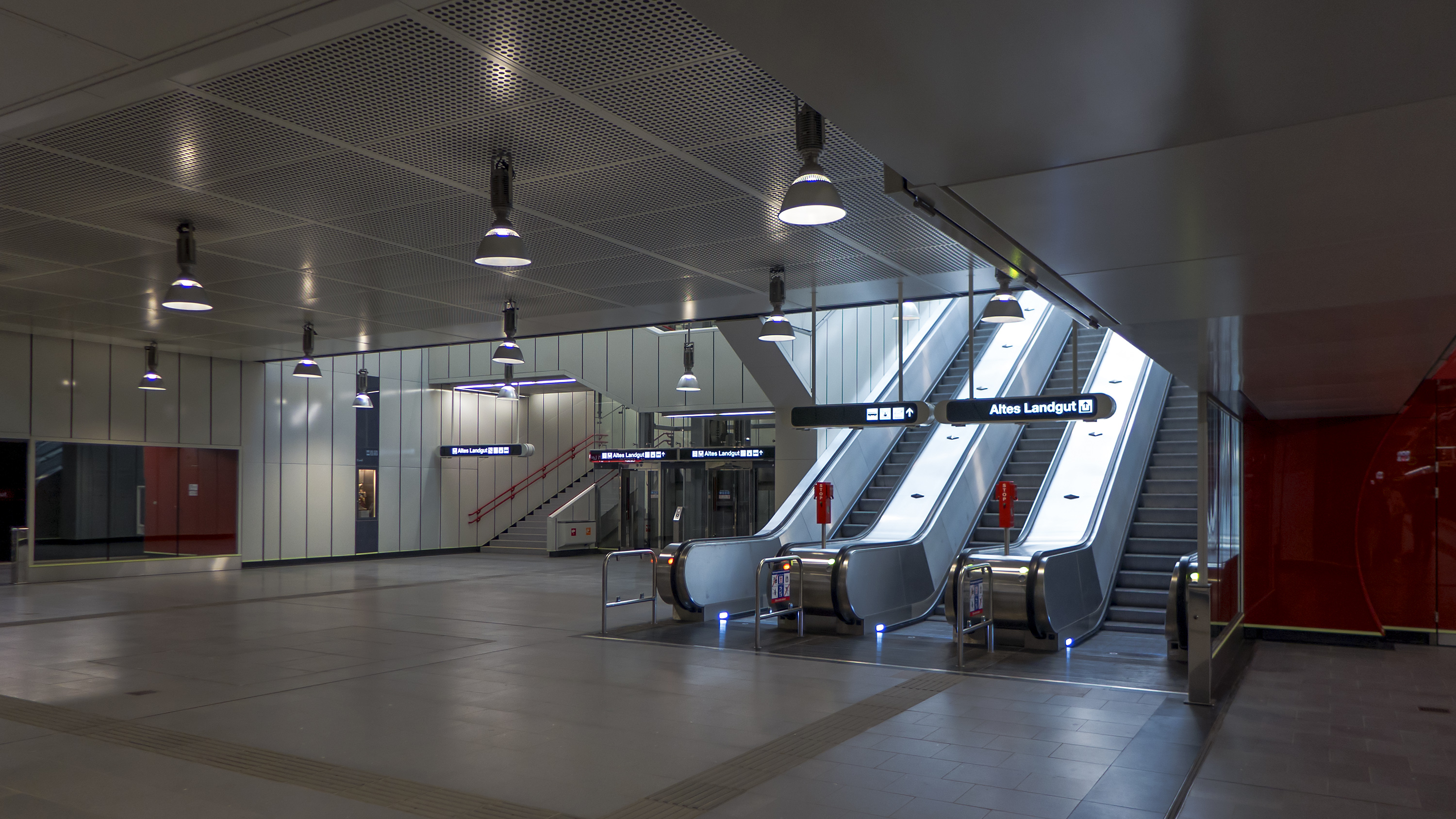
Distribution floor

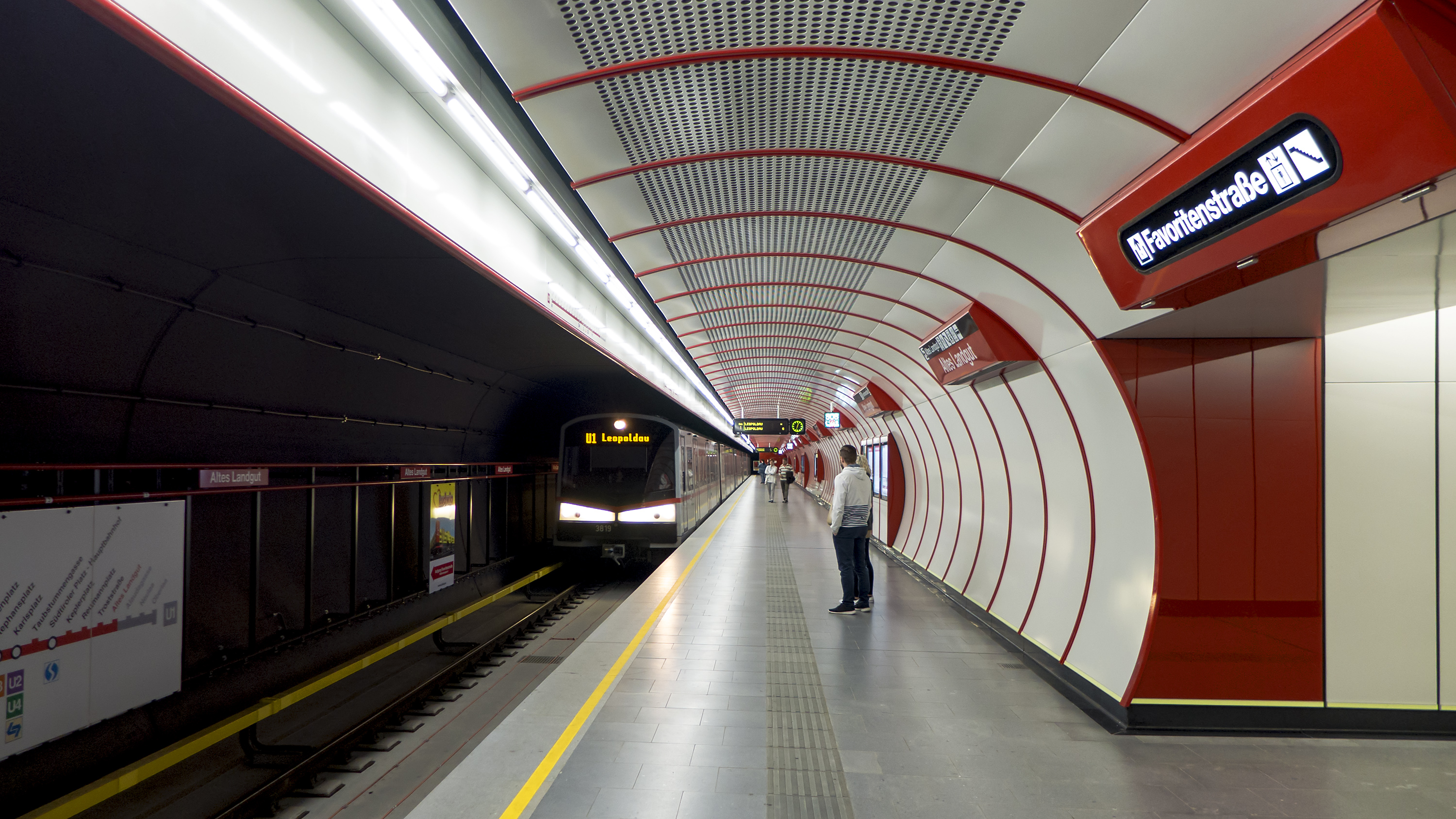
Platform for trains to Leopoldau

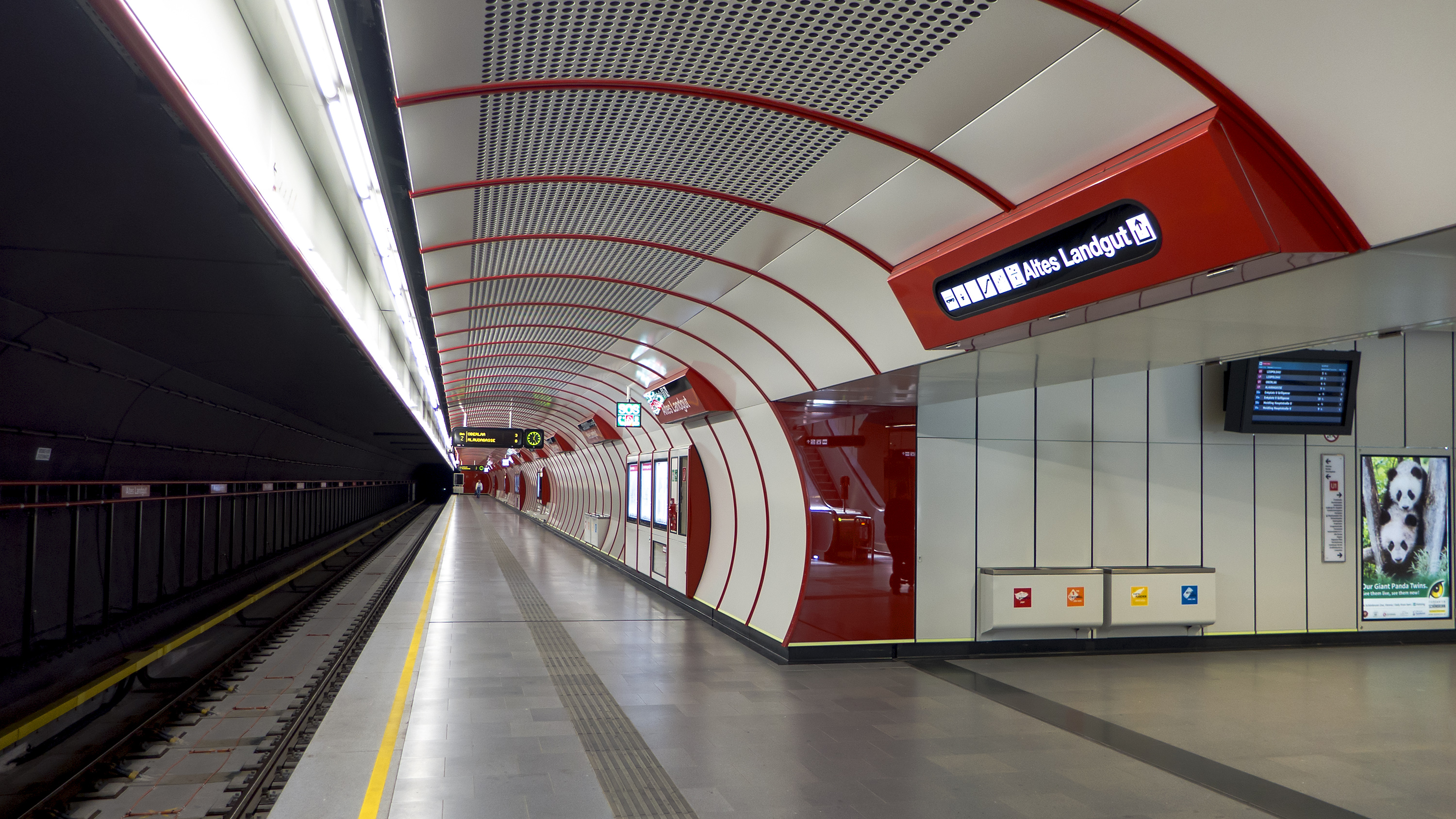
Platform for trains to Oberlaa

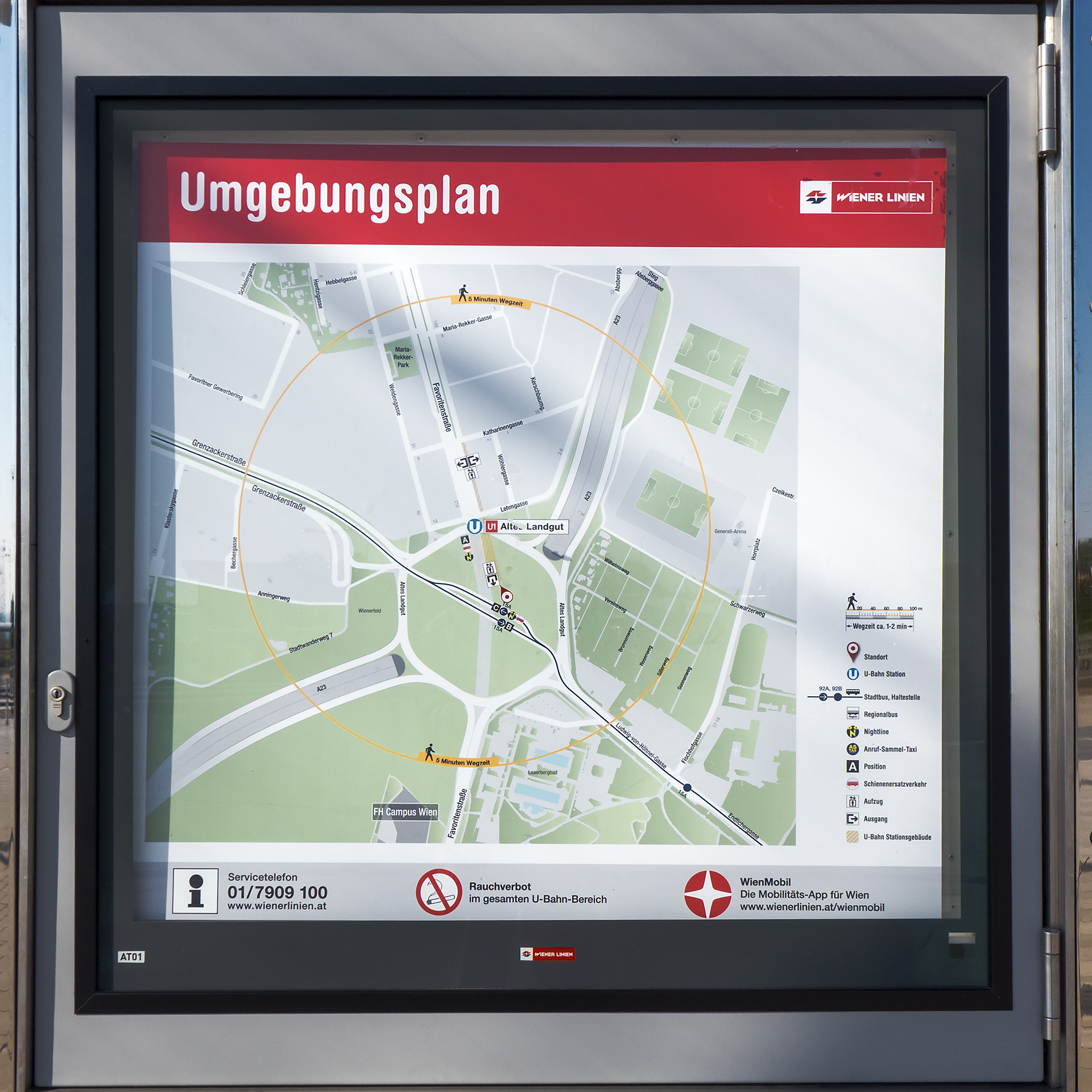
Local area map

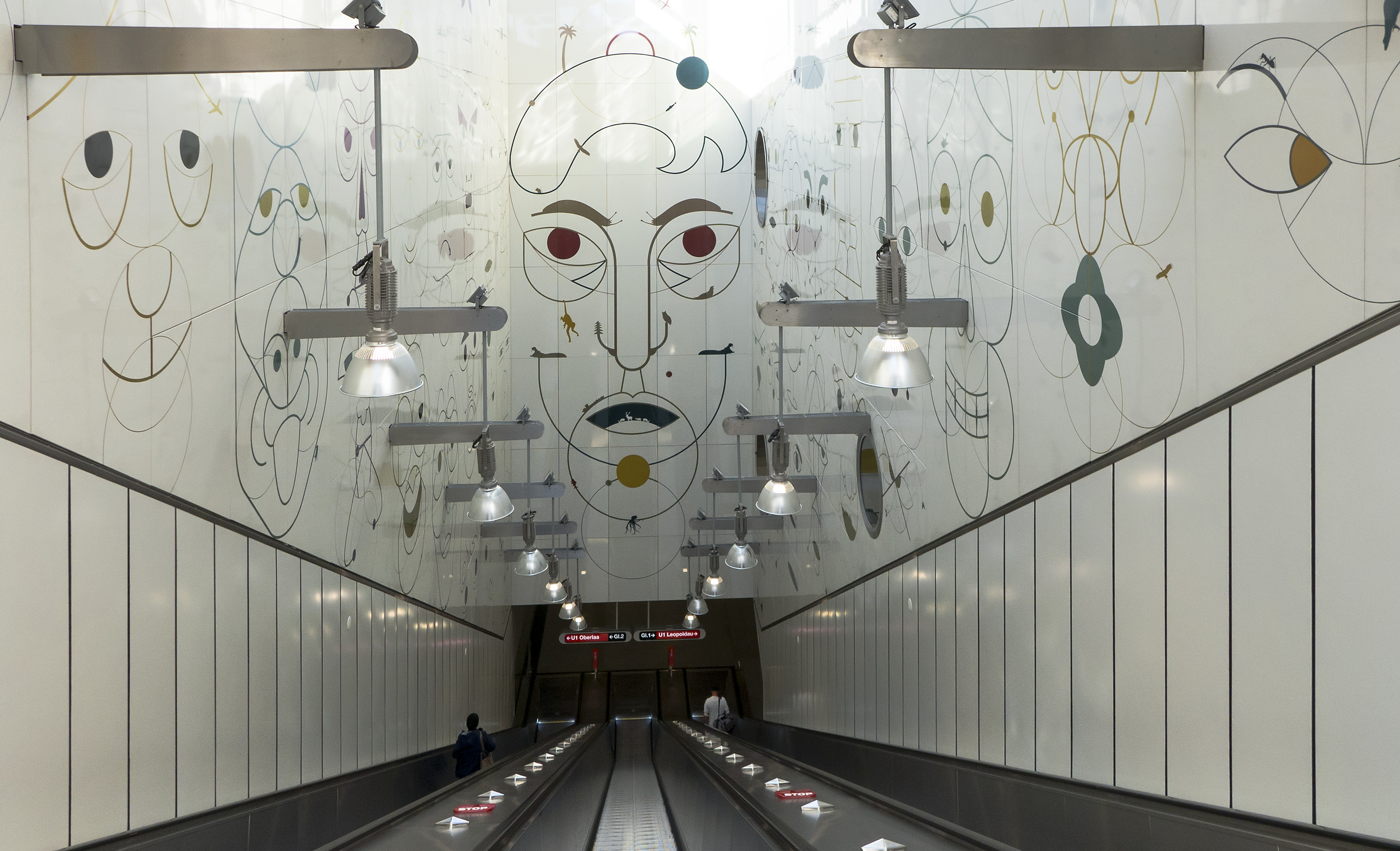
Installation Gesichts-überwachungs-schnecken

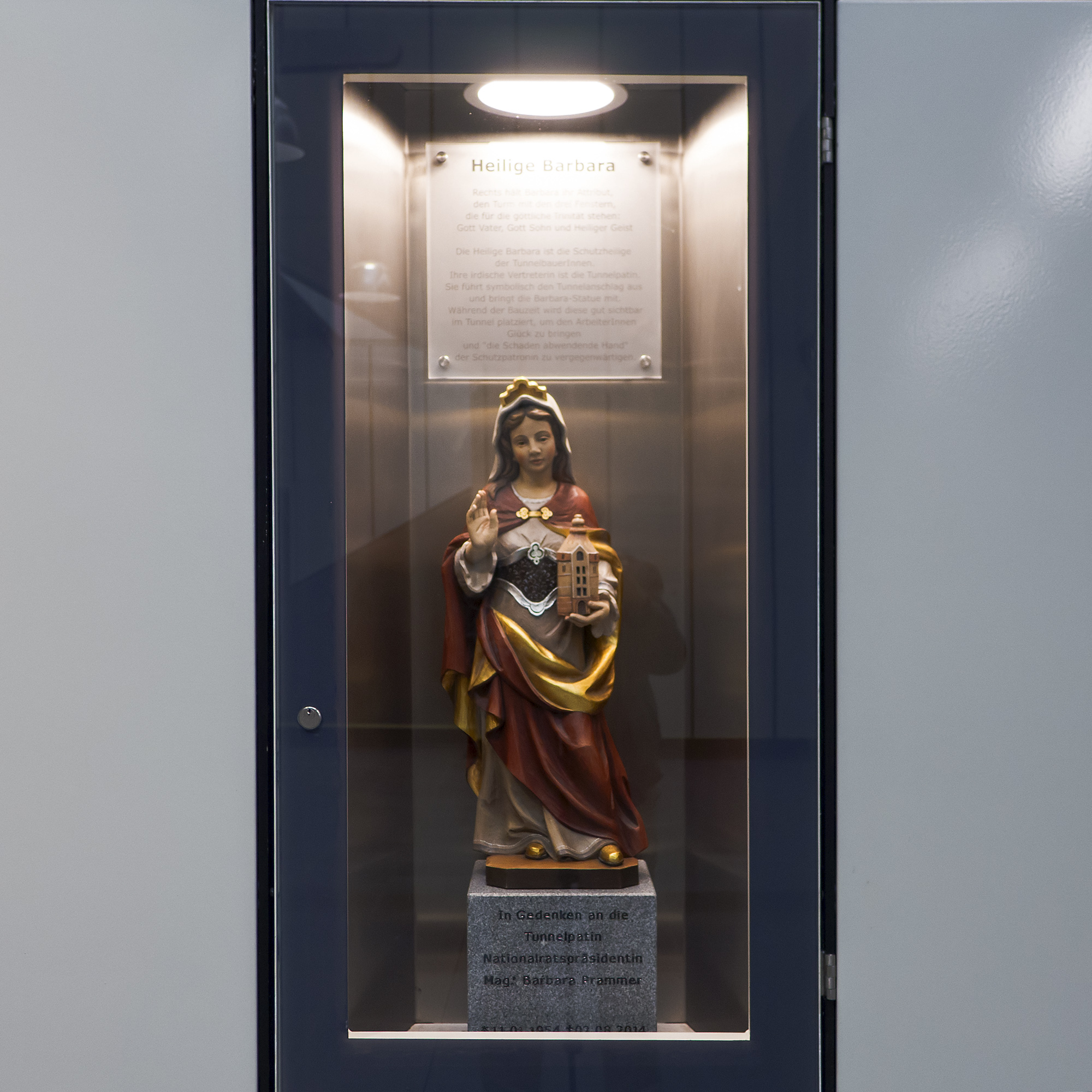
Figure of Saint Barbara
