= Alaudagasse station =

Vienna U-Bahn station

Alaudagasse
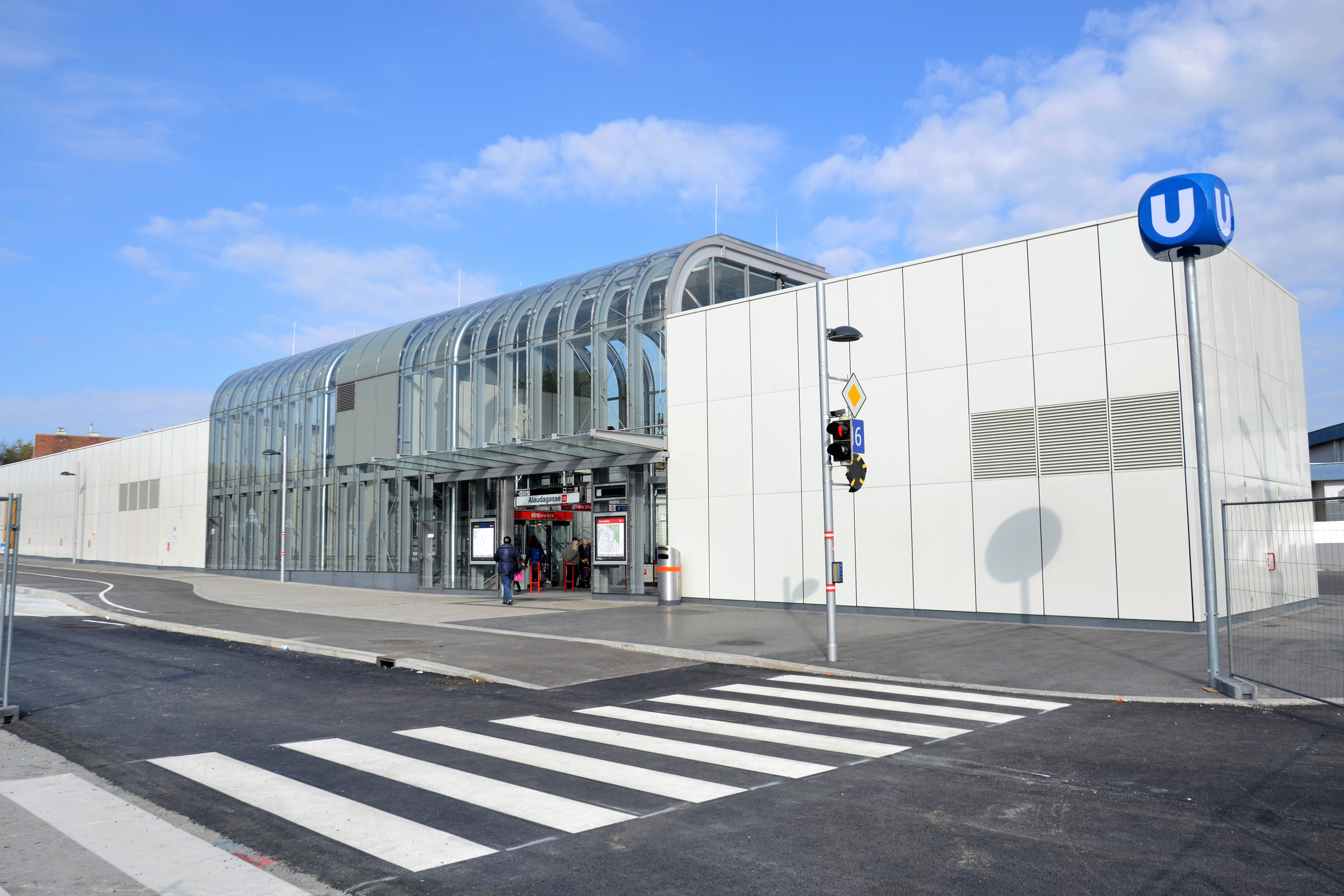

General information
- Location: Favoriten, Vienna; Austria
- Coordinates: 48.1536°N 16.3824°E

History
- Opened: 2 September 2017

Services
Preceding station	Wiener Linien	Following station
Neulaa toward Oberlaa	U1	Altes Landgut toward Leopoldau
Location

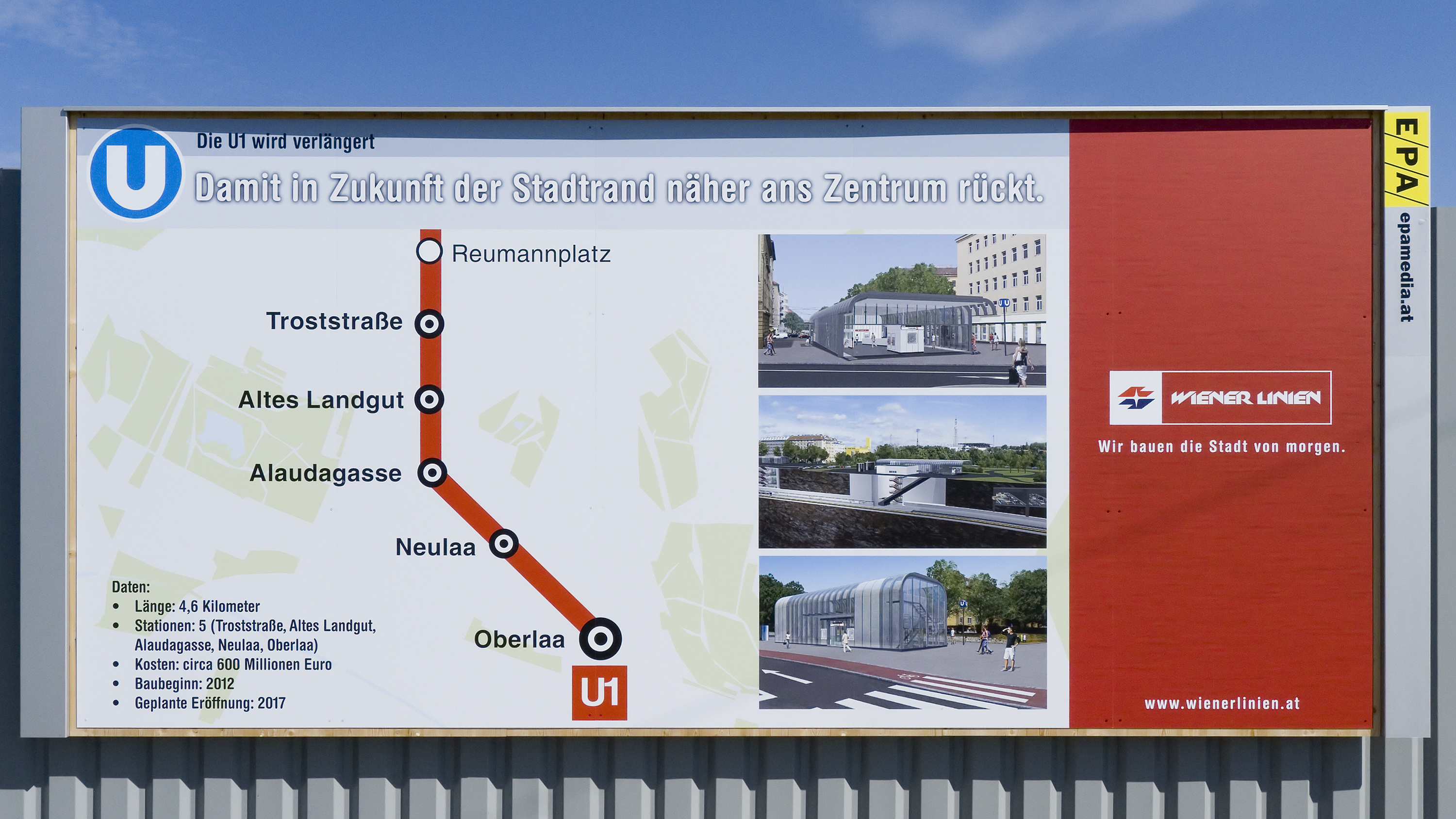
Information board for the southern extension of the U1

Alaudagasse is a station on Line U1 of the Vienna U-Bahn located in the 10th district of Vienna. It was opened on September 2, 2017. It is part of the extension of the U1 from Reumannplatz to Therme Wien in Oberlaa.

The station, like the majority of the extension, is on or below the north-south Favoritenstraße and is named after the branching here Alaudagasse on the northern edge of the Per-Albin-Hansson Siedlung Ost, which is located east of the route. West of the station is the Per-Albin-Hansson Siedlung Nord. With the opening of the extension of the U1, the tram line 67 was shut down; it had served the stops Alaudagasse and Stockholmer Platz within the area of the current station.

South of the Alaudagasse station, the U1 towards Oberlaa, which until this point ran along the Favoritenstraße, branches off and now runs parallel to the Donauländebahn to the Therme Wien. Here, a double-track turning system was built, which is designed in preparation for a line bifurcation. Thus, the possibility of an extension of the U1 to Rothneusiedl, as had been originally planned, remains.

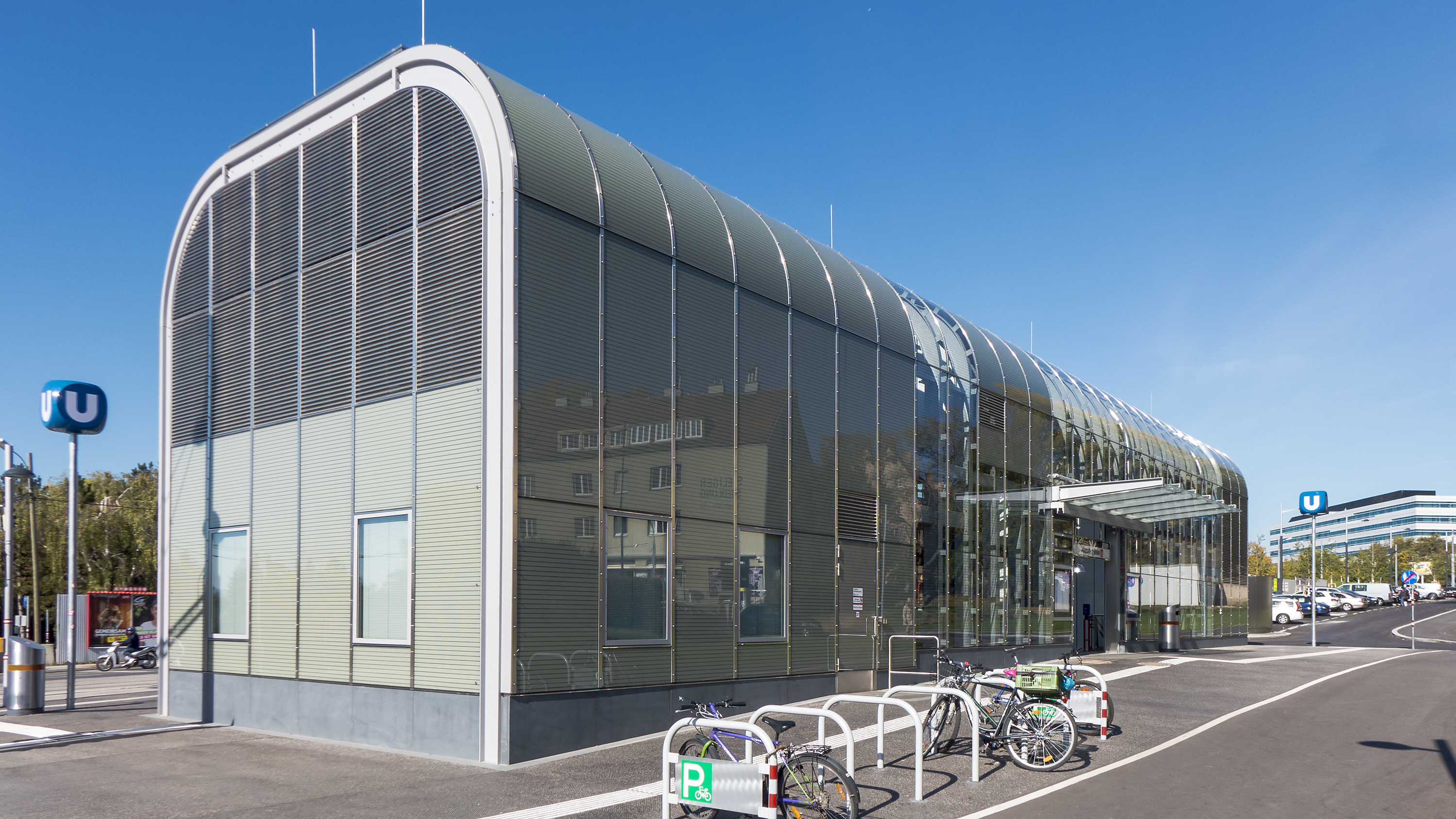
Northern entrance

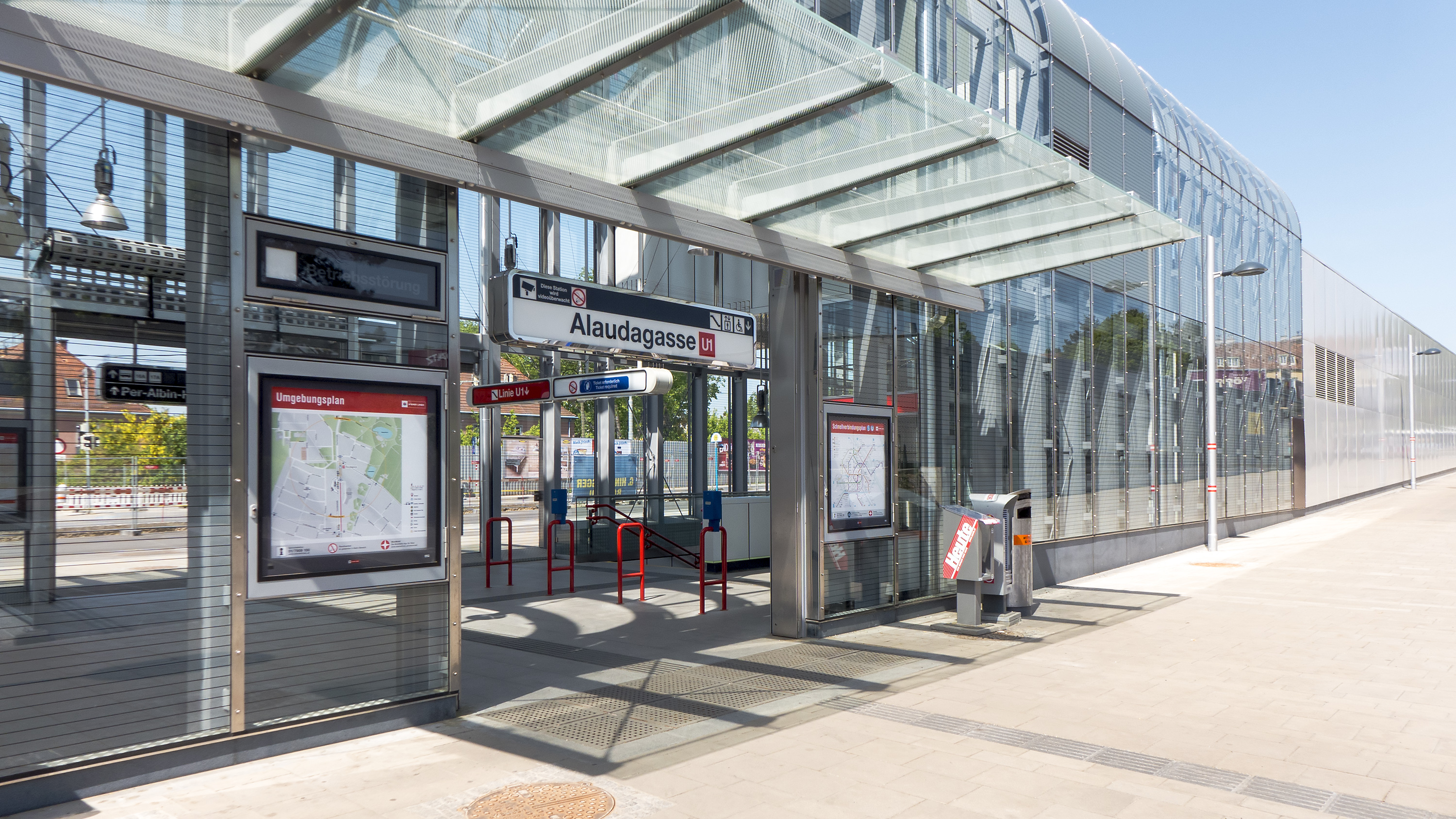
Southern entrance

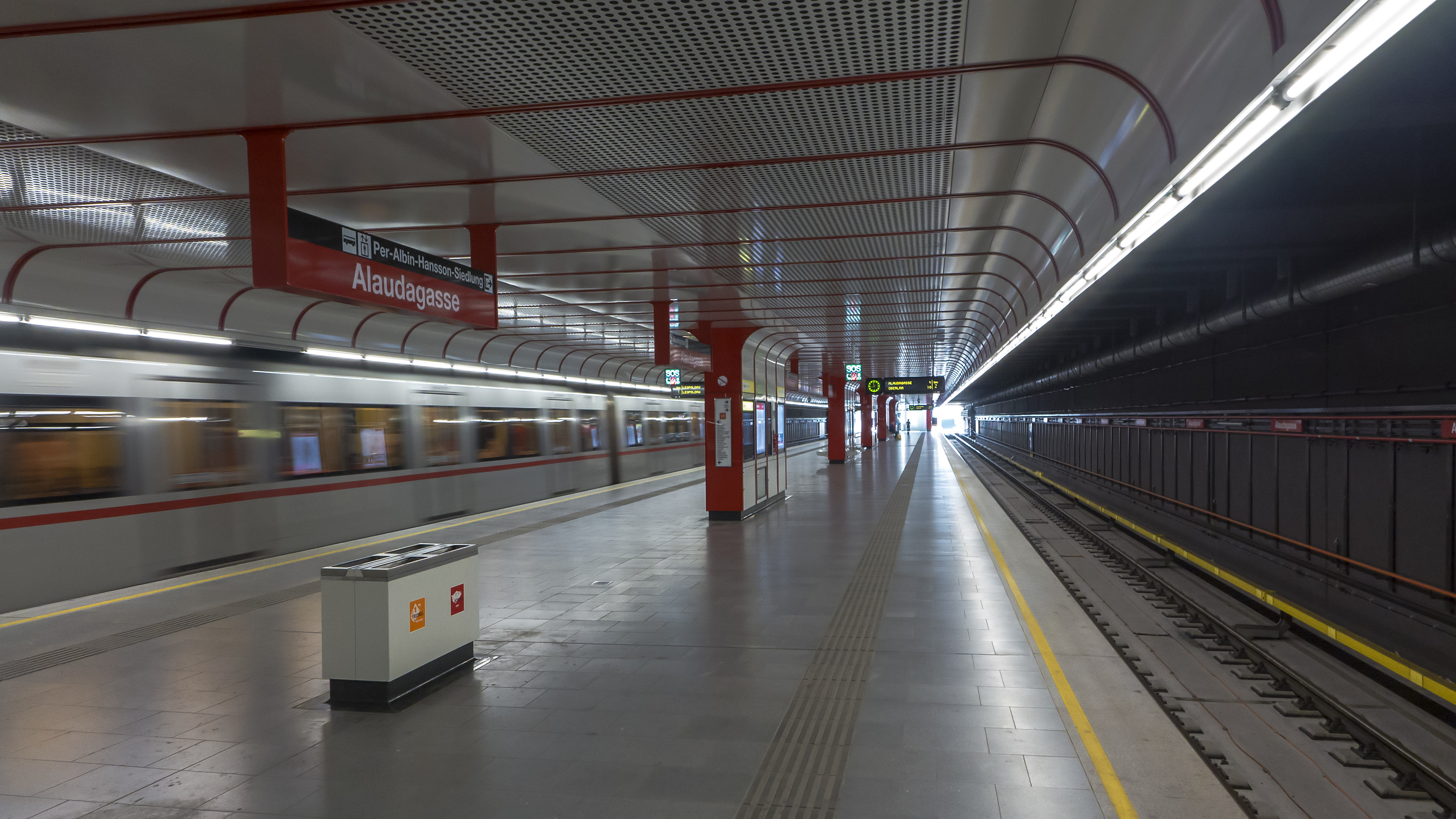
Platform for trains to Oberlaa

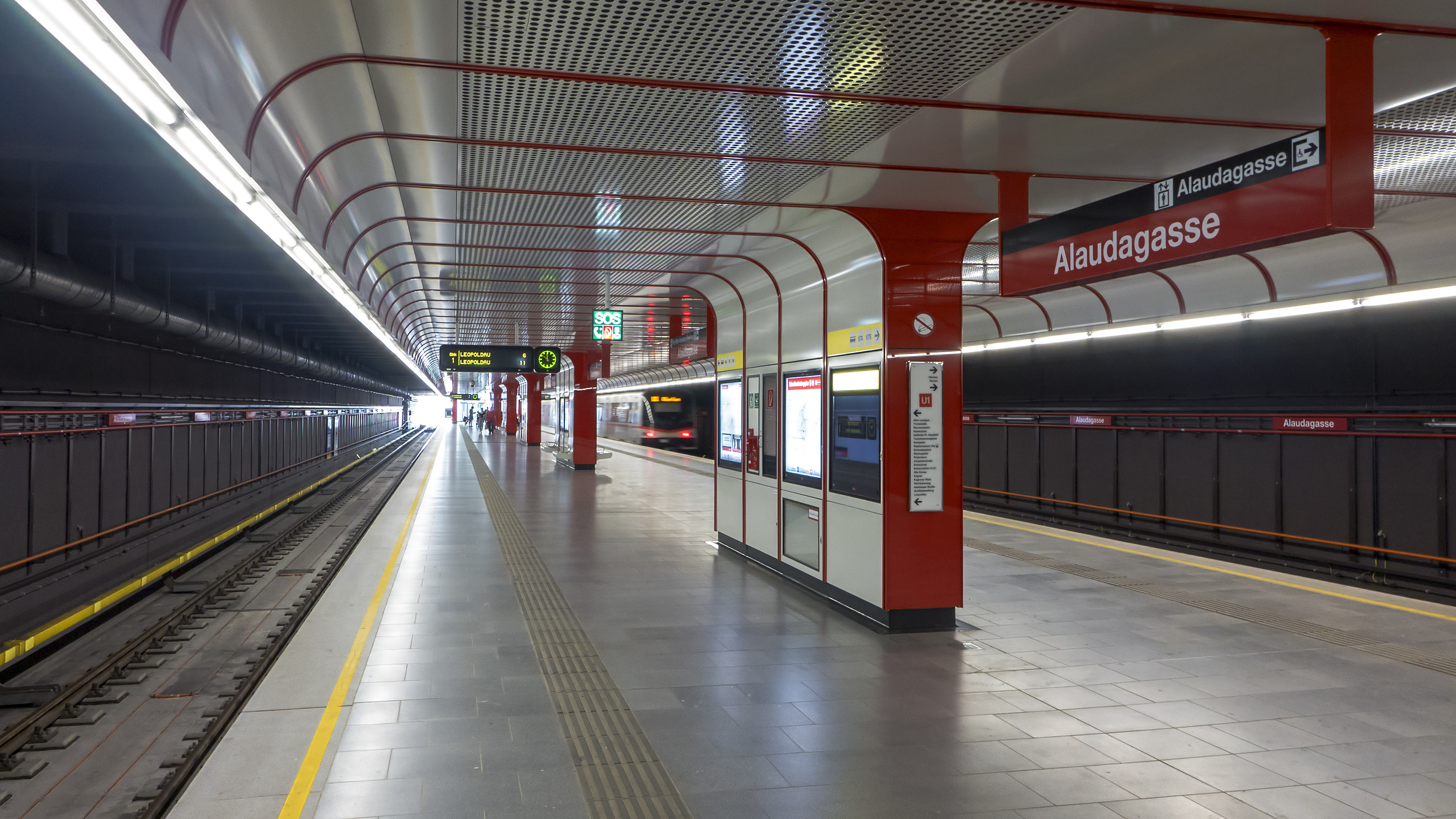
Platform for trains to Leopoldau

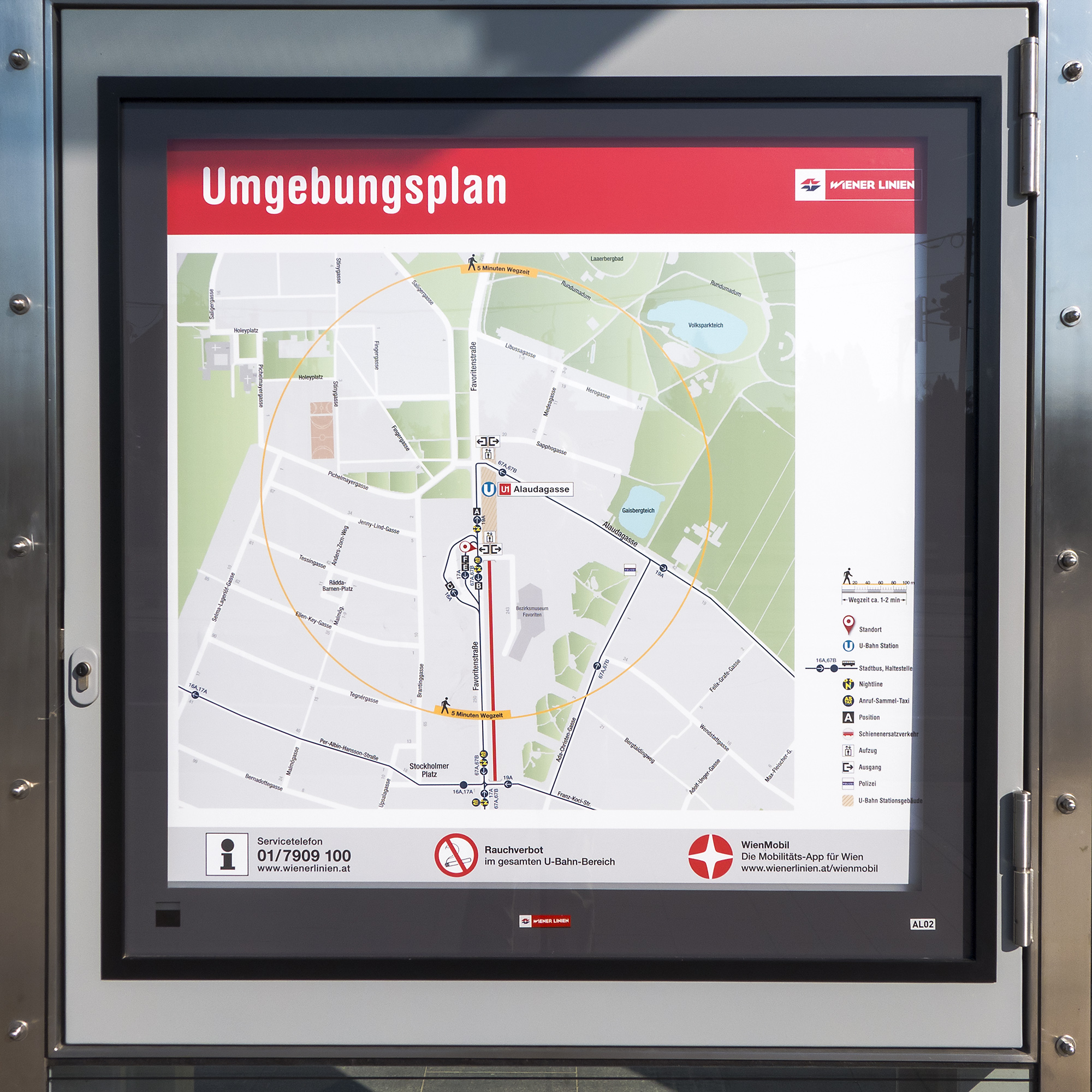
Map of the local area
