= Troststraße station =

Vienna U-Bahn station

Troststraße
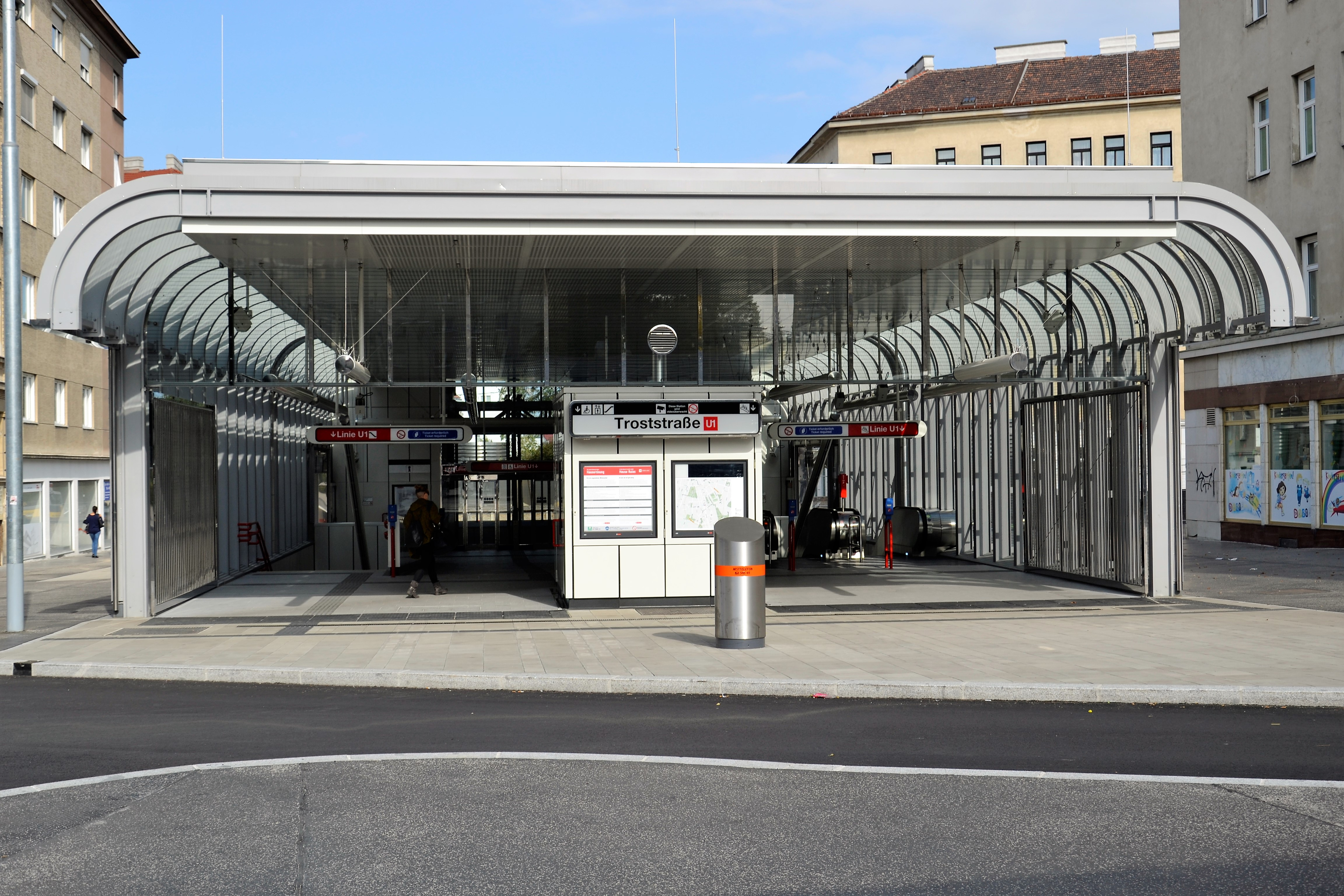

General information
- Location: Favoriten, Vienna; Austria
- Coordinates: 48.1690°N 16.3803°E

History
- Opened: 2 September 2017

Services
Preceding station	Wiener Linien	Following station
Altes Landgut toward Oberlaa	U1	Reumannplatz toward Leopoldau
Location

Troststraße is a station of the line U1 of the Vienna U-Bahn, located under the Favoritenstraße in Favoriten, the 10th district of Vienna, Austria. It was opened on 2 September 2017. It was built as part of the extension of the U1 from Reumannplatz to Oberlaa station.

== Facilities ==
The station Troststraße was built in a low position below the Favoritenstraße; it is about 700 m (2,300 ft) from the neighboring station Reumannplatz, which was the terminus of the U1 until the opening of the Oberlaa extension. The station has a 115 m-long (377 ft) central platform with an entrance on each side. The northern entrance leads to the Favoritenstraße in the area of the crossing with the Angeligasse; the southern entrance is in the Klausenburger Straße west of the Favoritenstraße. The southern staircase has two elevators, three escalators and a staircase; the northern one has two elevators and a staircase.

== Design ==
In the hall under the Klausenburger Straße exit is the artwork Lines and Double by Michael Kienzer. The artist responds to the components of the station with a sculpturally composed antithesis; the title is already ambiguous. Lines point to additional delicate and straight cuts in the wall panels along the escalators, which start at the bottom and almost go up to the entrance. For the time being, the central sculptural element Double references a third elevator shaft in the basement, newly constructed and not accessible, directly next to the local double-lift.

Near the platforms there is a figure of Saint Barbara, the patron saint of miners.

== Gallery ==
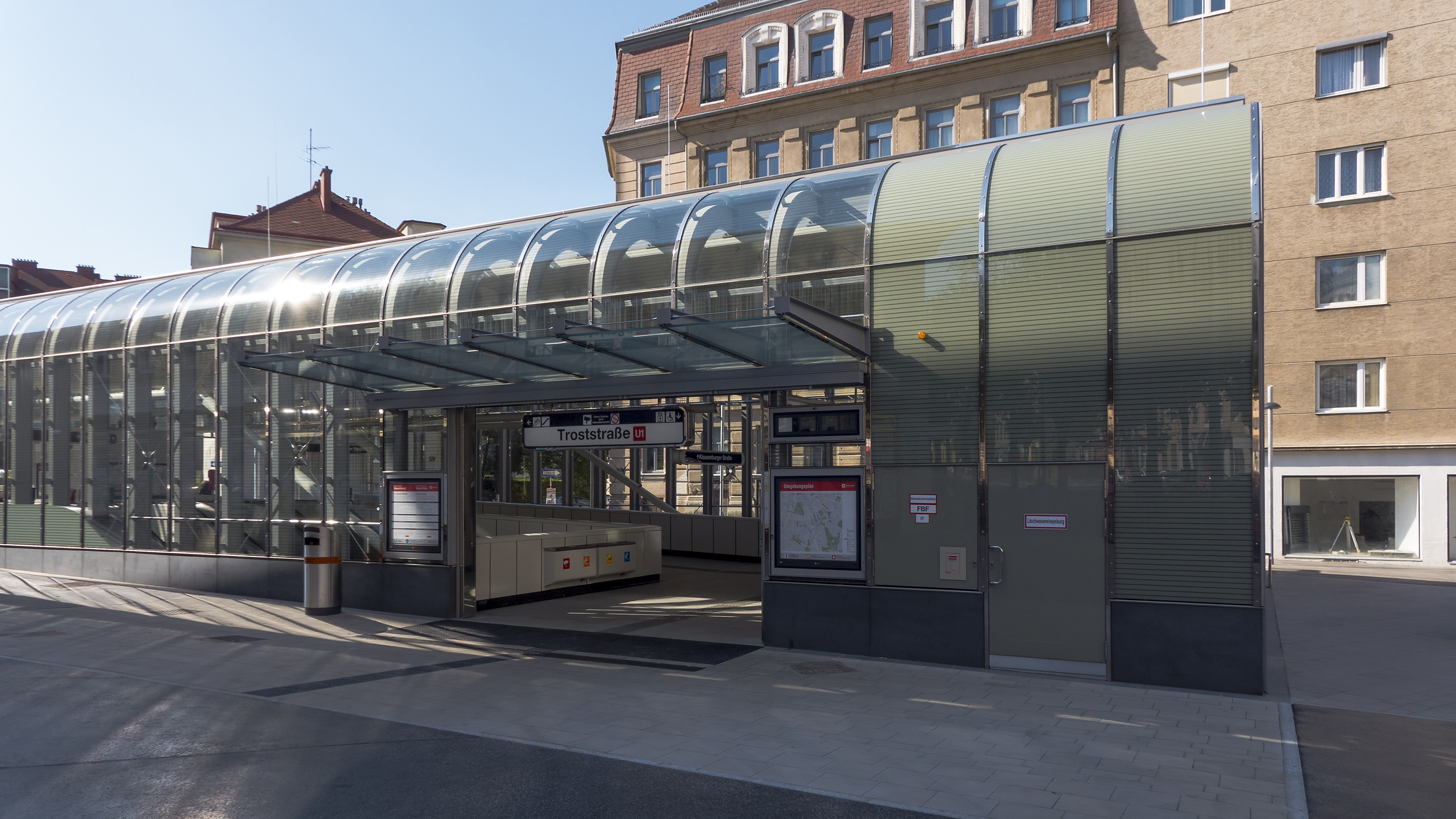
Klausenburger Straße entrance

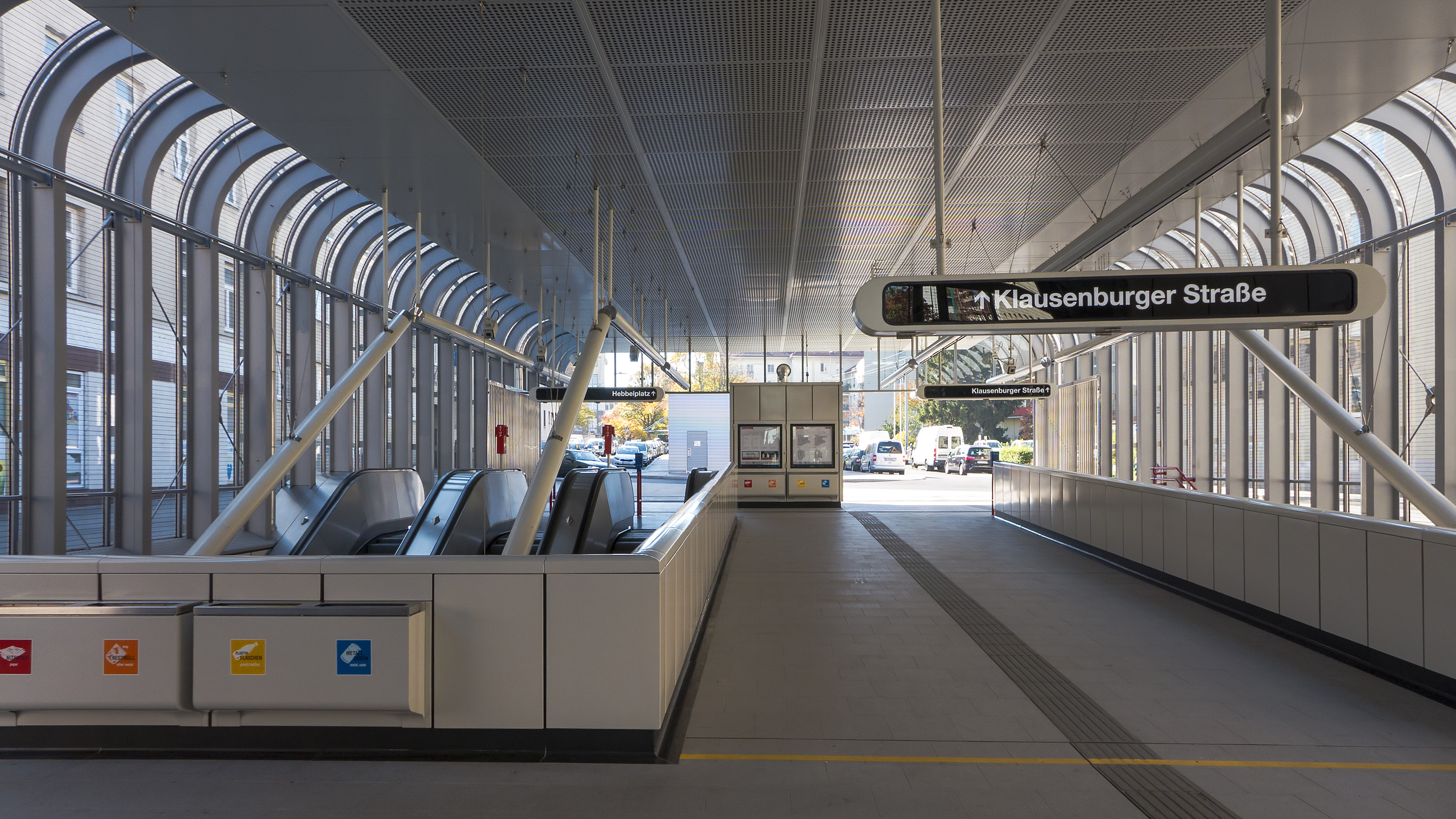
Entrance, inside

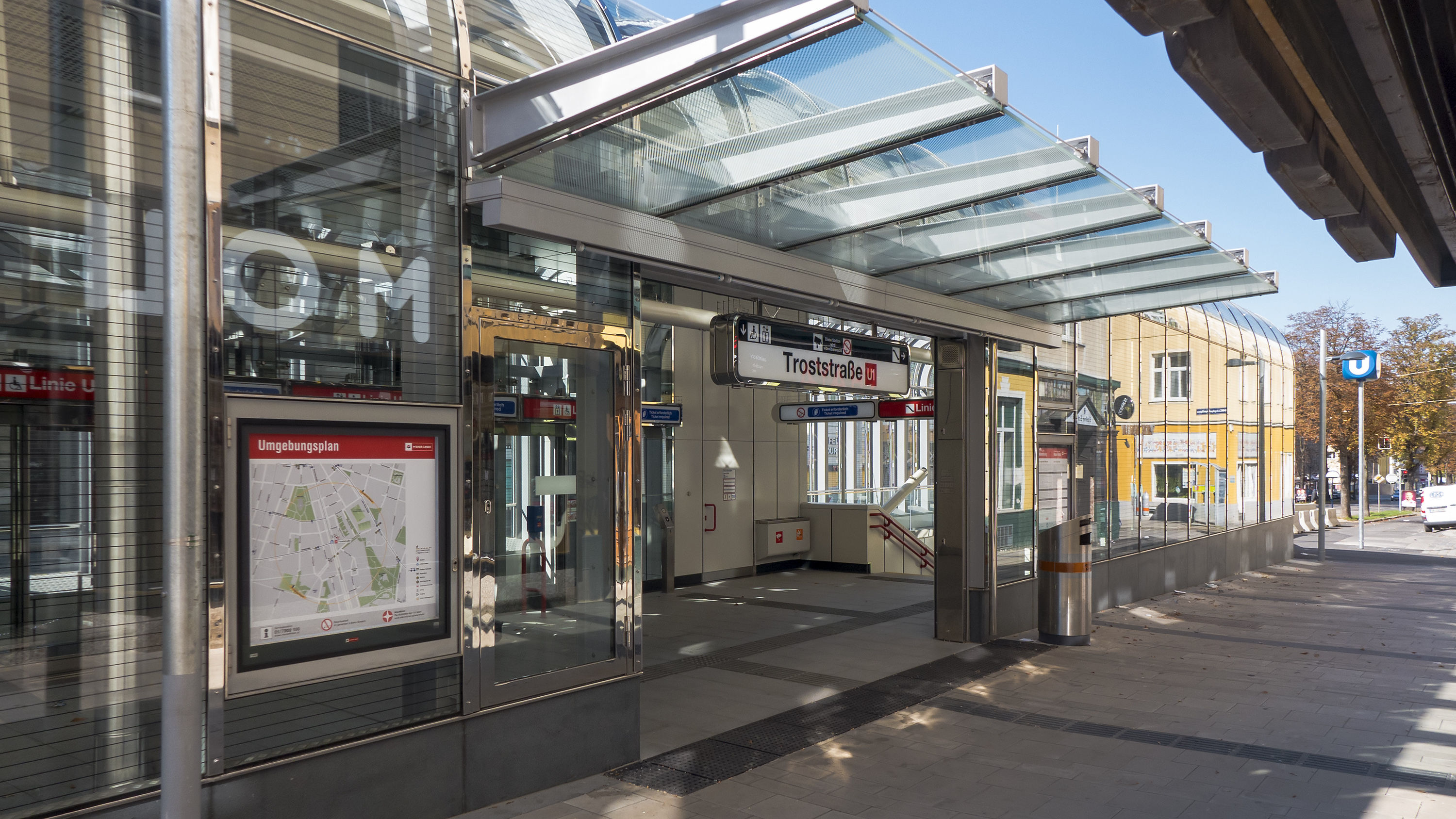
Angeligasse entrance

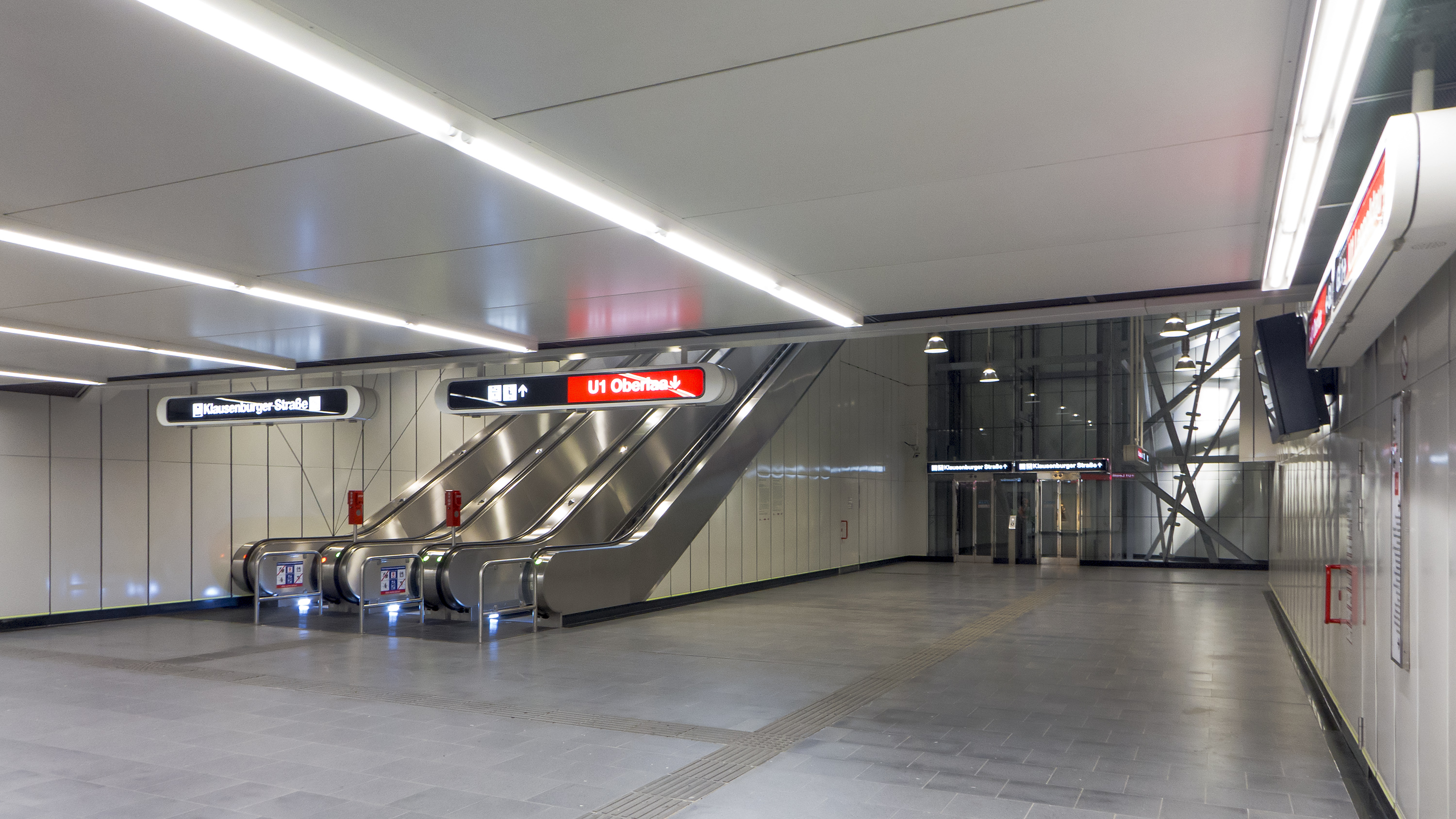
Distribution floor

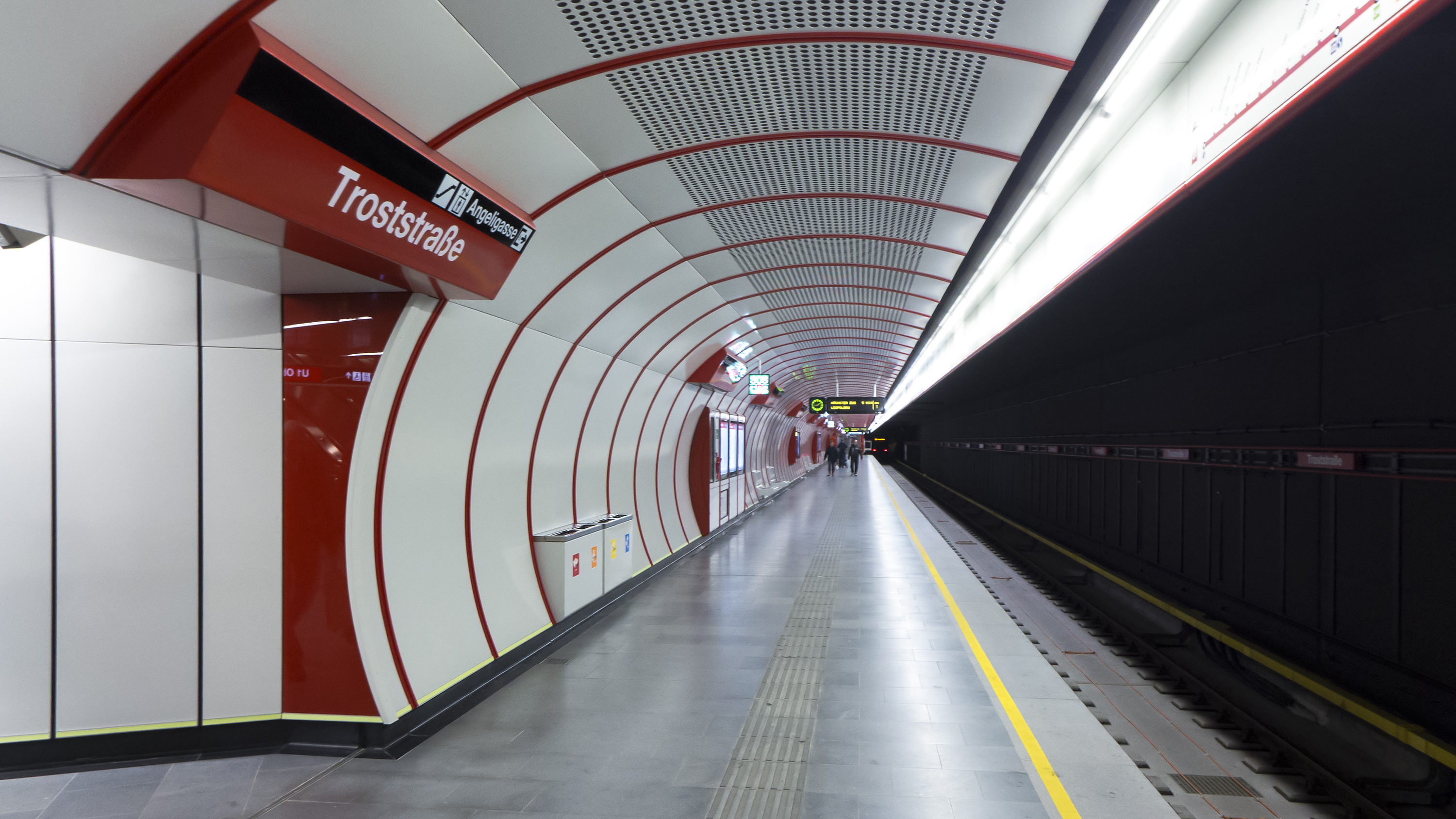
Platform facing Leopoldau

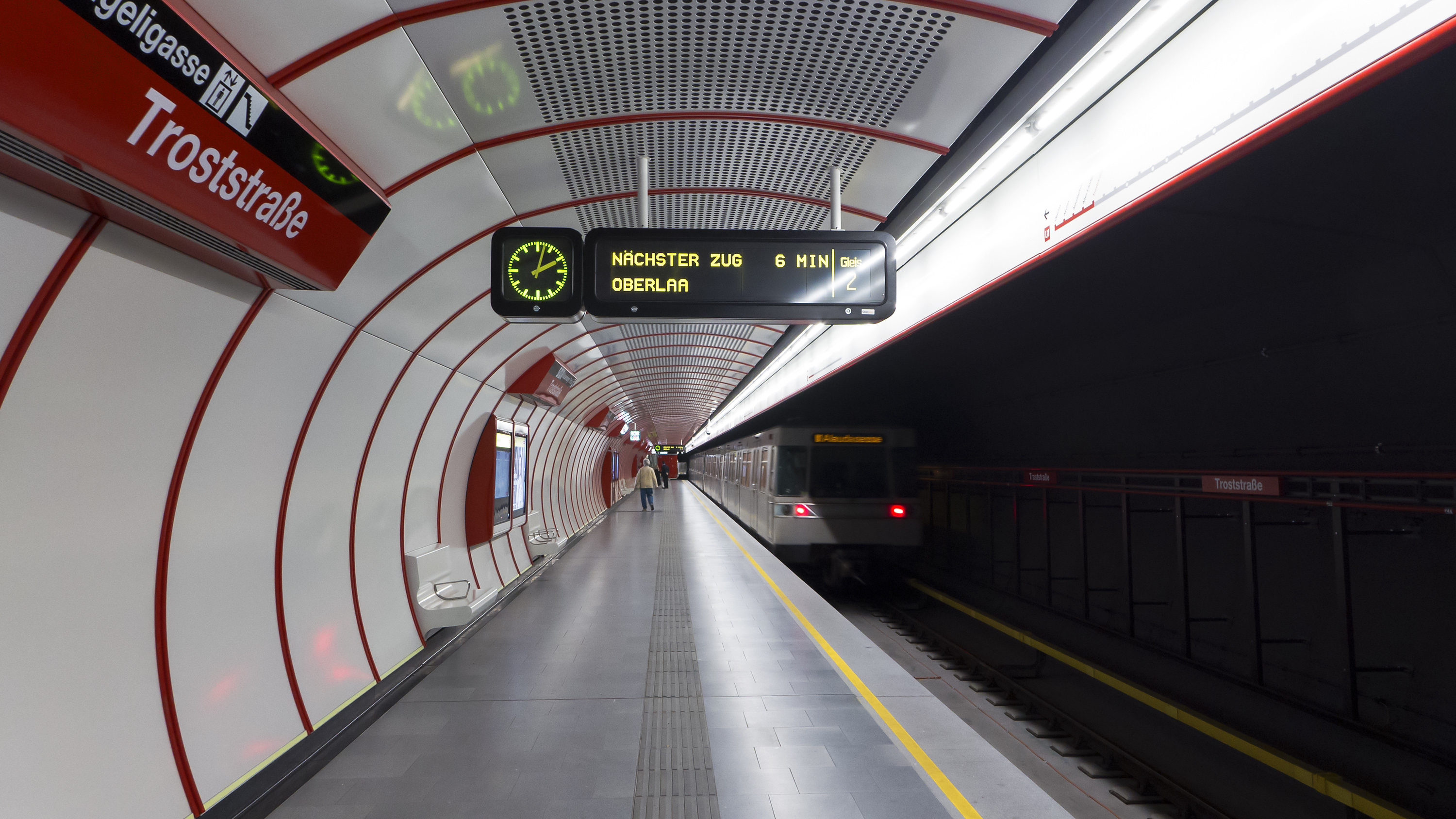
Platform facing Oberlaa

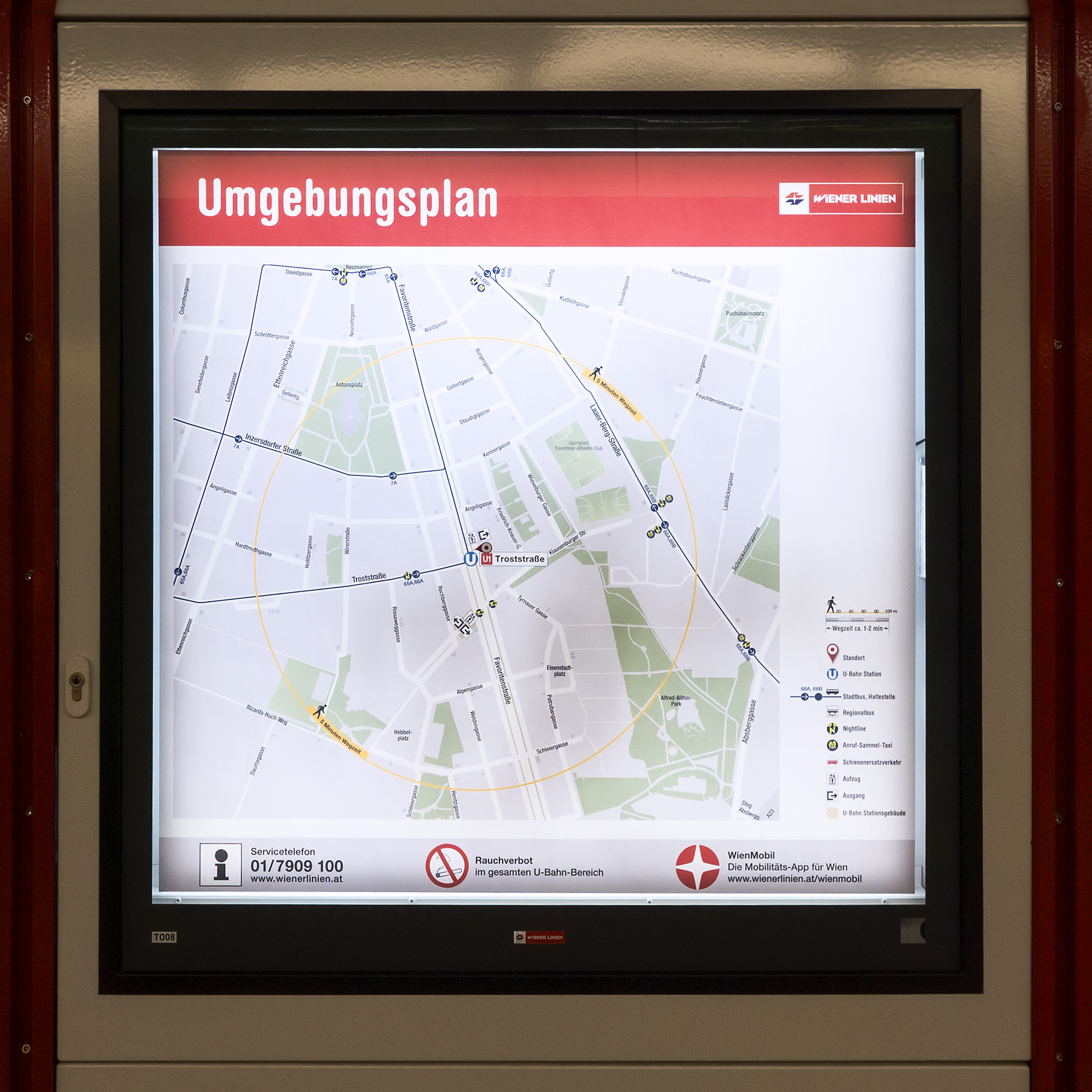
Local map

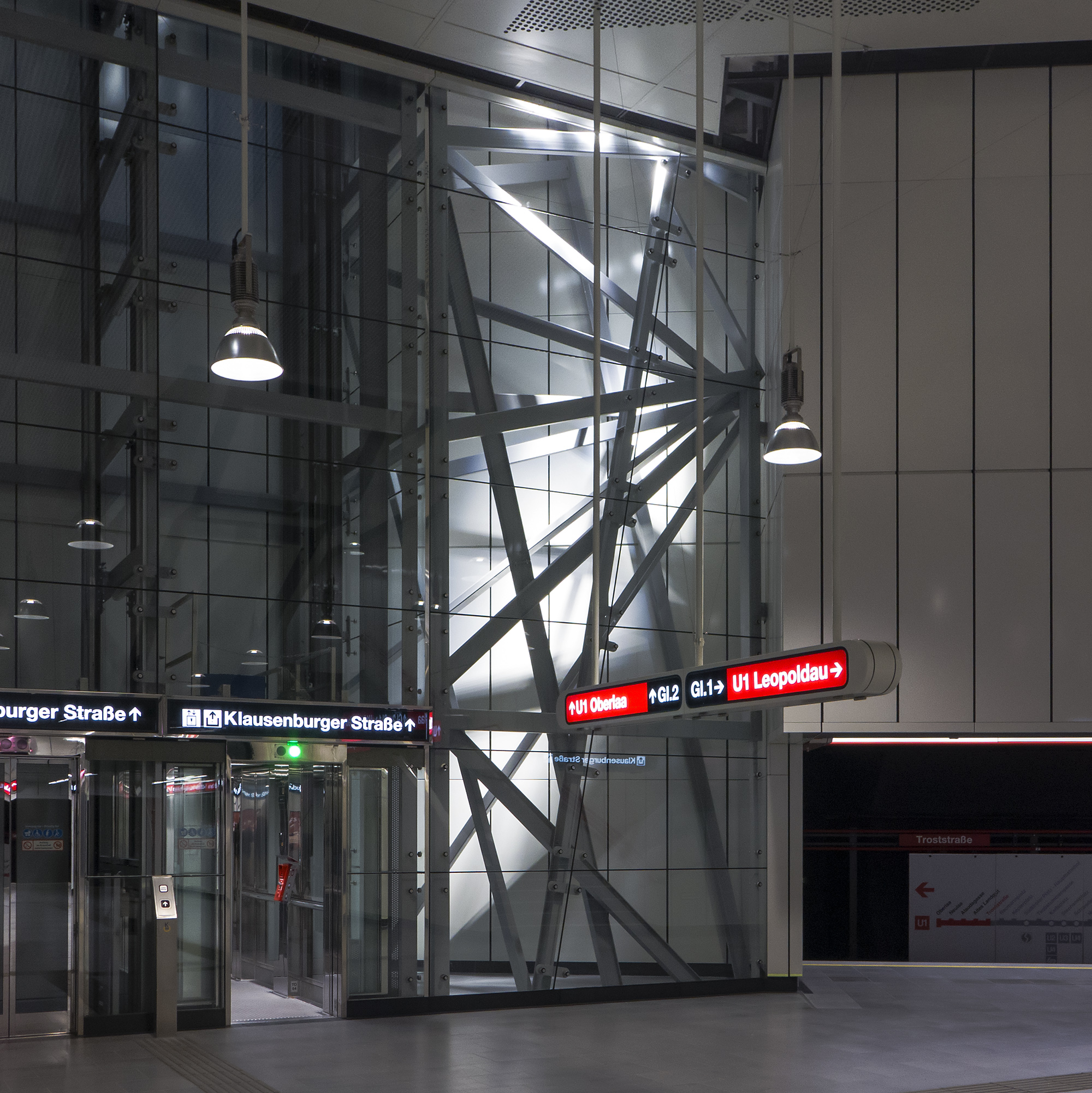
Installation Lines and Double

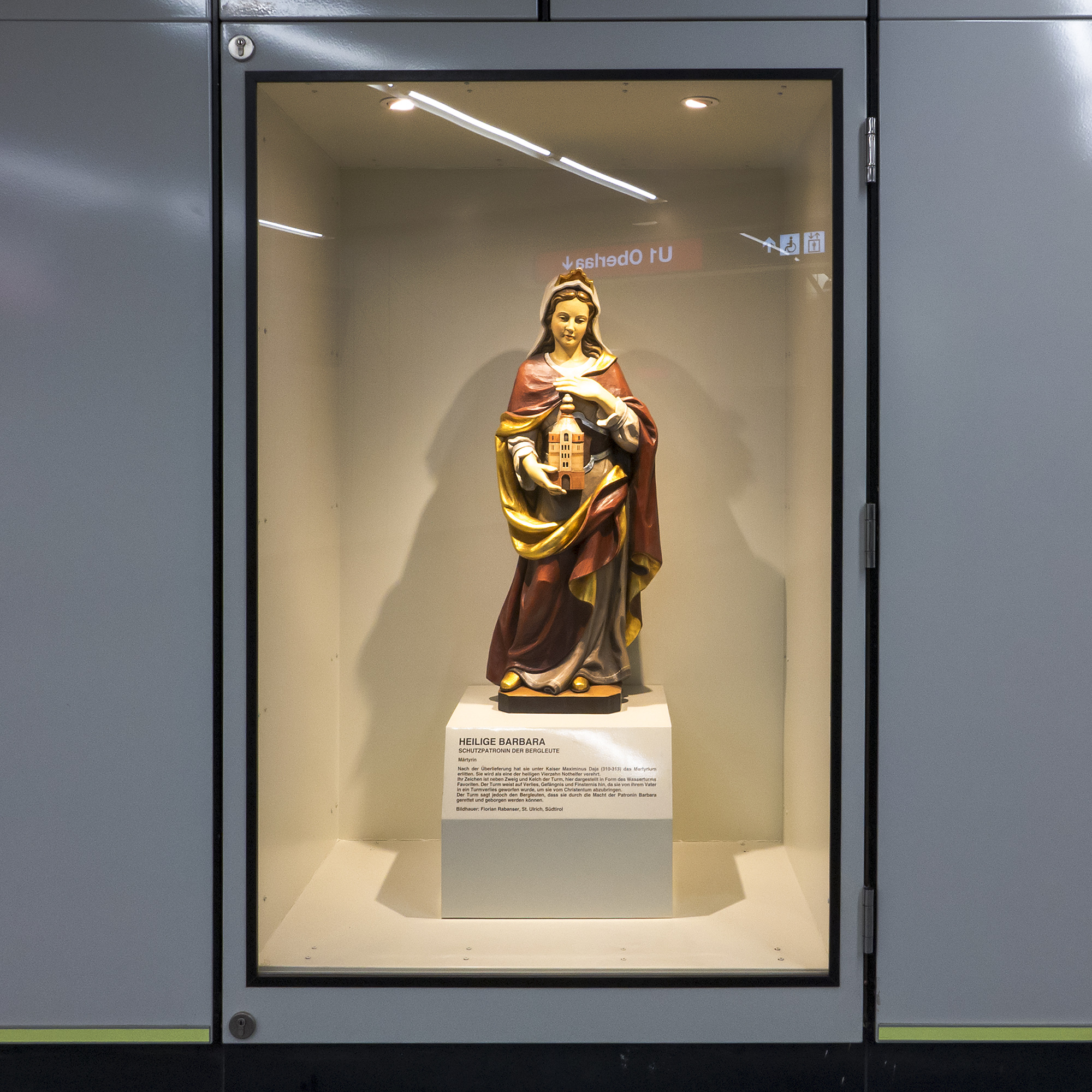
Figure of Saint Barbara
