= University of Applied Sciences Campus Vienna =

Coordinates: 48.15783°N 16.38218°E

- Hochschule Campus Wien
- Type: Public
- Established: 2001
- Officer in charge: Doris Link (CEO), Silvia Kaupa-Götzl (CFO)
- Rector: Heimo Sandtner, Evelyn Süss-Stepancik, Elisabeth Haslinger-Baumann
- Faculty: 2.642, of whom 356 are full-time and 2,286 are part-time faculty and researchers
- Students: ~9.100
- Location: Vienna, Austria
- Campus: Urban
- Website: www.hcw.ac.at

The University of Applied Sciences Campus Vienna (UAS Campus Vienna, German: Hochschule für Angewandte Wissenschaften Campus Wien or Hochschule Campus Wien, abbreviated as “HCW”) is the largest university of applied sciences in Austria. It is located in the capital city Vienna, has about 9,100 students and offers 73 study programs which are divided in seven departments:

- Applied Life Sciences
- Building and Design
- Health Sciences
- Applied Nursing Science
- Social Sciences
- Engineering
- Administration, Economics, Security, Politics

The main campus of Campus Wien University is located on Favoritenstraße in Vienna's 10th district.
