= Reumannplatz station =

Vienna U-Bahn station

Reumannplatz
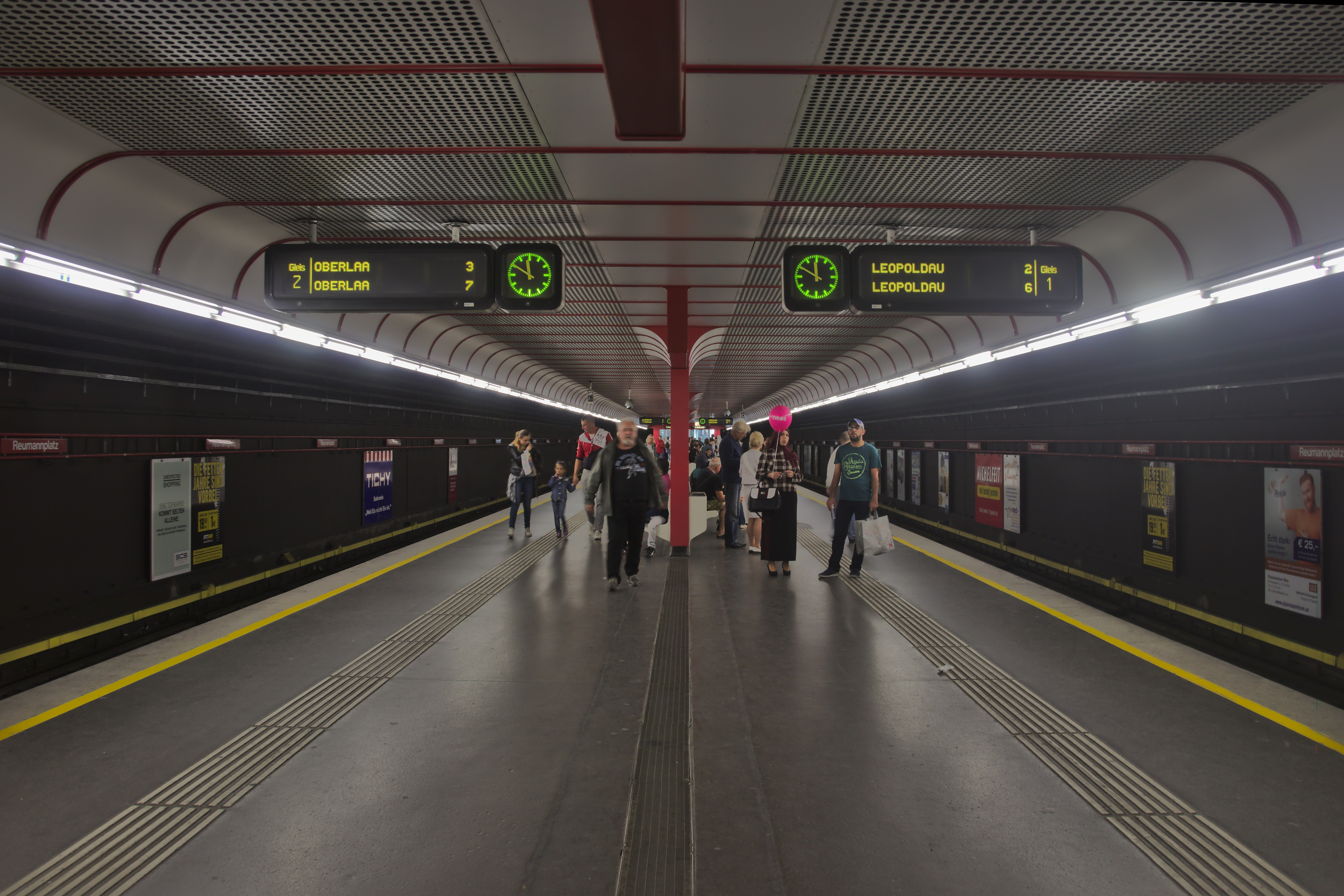

General information
- Location: Favoriten, Vienna; Austria
- Coordinates: 48°10′27″N 16°22′41″E

History
- Opened: 25 February 1978

Services
Preceding station	Wiener Linien	Following station
Troststraße toward Oberlaa	U1	Keplerplatz toward Leopoldau
Location

Reumannplatz is a station on U1 of the Vienna U-Bahn. It is located in the Favoriten district. It opened in 1978.
