= Albert Reuss =

Austrian-born British painter and sculptor

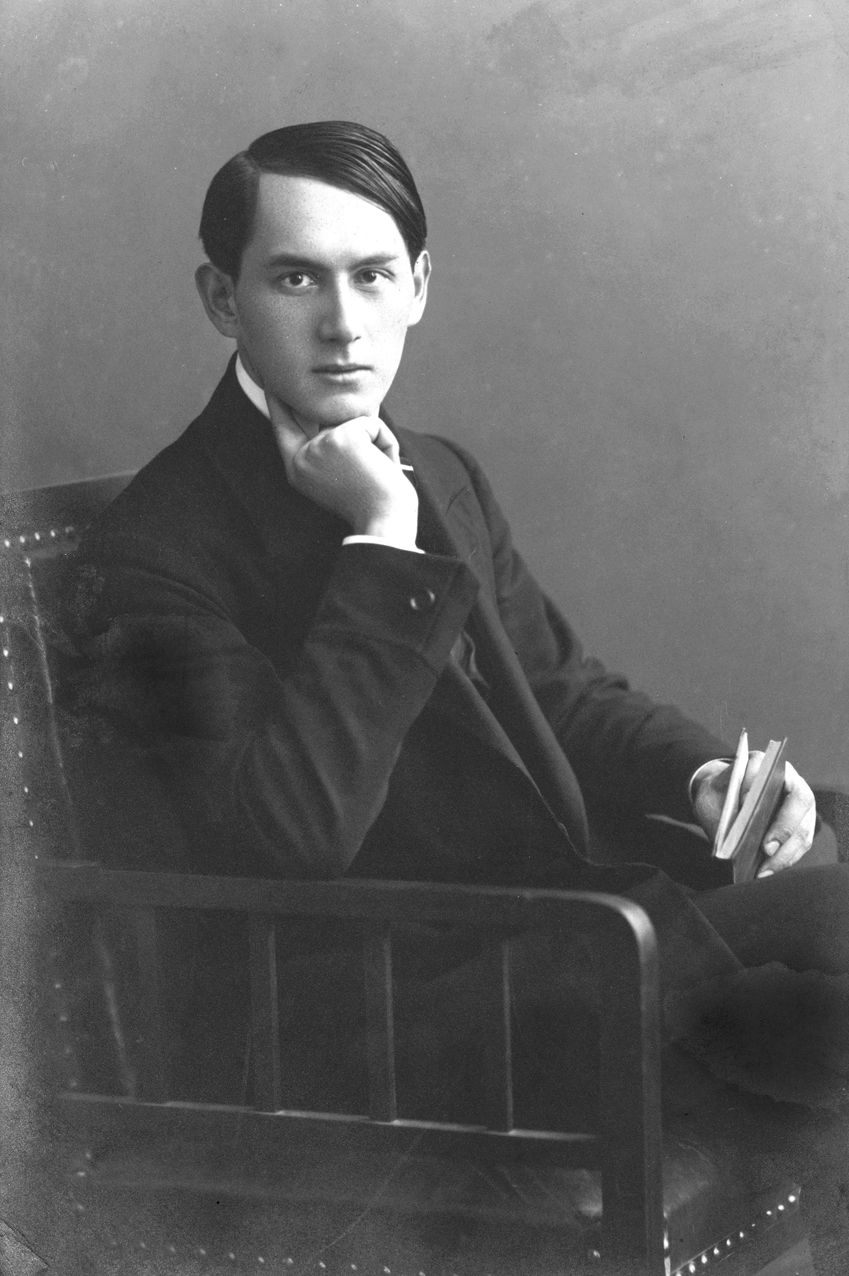
Albert Reuss in 1915

Albert Reuss (2 October 1889 – 4 November 1975) was an Austrian-born British painter and sculptor. He was born in Vienna and fled to Britain in 1938 following the Anschluss, Adolf Hitler’s annexation of Austria to the German Reich. In the process, Reuss lost many members of his family, and the reputation he had built up as an artist in Vienna. He continued to work as an exiled artist, but his style changed dramatically, reflecting the trauma he had suffered. Many public collections in Britain hold his work, most notably Newlyn Art Gallery in Cornwall, the British Museum and the Victoria and Albert Museum in London, the Österreichische Galerie Belvedere (the Belvedere Gallery) and the Albertina both in Vienna, and the Tel Aviv Museum of Art in Israel.

== Life ==
=== 1889–1922: Early years in Vienna ===
Albert Reuss was the son of Hungarian Jews, Ignaz Reisz (1855–1911) and Sidonia née Freund (1861–1928). Ignaz was a Fleischhauermeister and Fleischhändler, a master butcher and meat trader. The couple at some stage moved to Malacky, in former Hungary, now Slovakia, where their first three sons were born. In the late 1880s, the family moved to Vienna, where Albert was born, followed by a further six children, three of whom died in infancy, leaving seven surviving children in all. The family name Reisz was changed by the Austrian authorities to Reiss. From a young age, Albert became estranged from his family. A frail, sickly and vulnerable child, he seemed neither to fit into nor to belong to the family into which he was born. He suffered from ill-health and had considerable difficulties with social interaction throughout his life. He was introduced to the world of art by a rich uncle, Baron Andreas Ritter von Reisinger, who was married to his father's sister, and who appears to have instilled in the young boy a lifelong inferiority complex. Albert's artistic abilities emerged when he was only five years old, and at the age of 14, he applied, unsuccessfully, to the Akademie der bildenden Künste Wien. Unable to pursue his dream of becoming an artist, he was obliged, on leaving school, to assist his father as a butcher. Given his delicate disposition and artistic sensibilities, working at the butchery was not an effective fit. There followed a series of equally unsuitable jobs, including salesman, childminder and actor, all of which ended in dismissal. These repeated experiences of rejection only added to his lack of self-worth. He became determined to teach himself by copying the Old Masters in the Belvedere Gallery and managed to gain several commissions for these paintings, as well as some commissions to paint portraits.

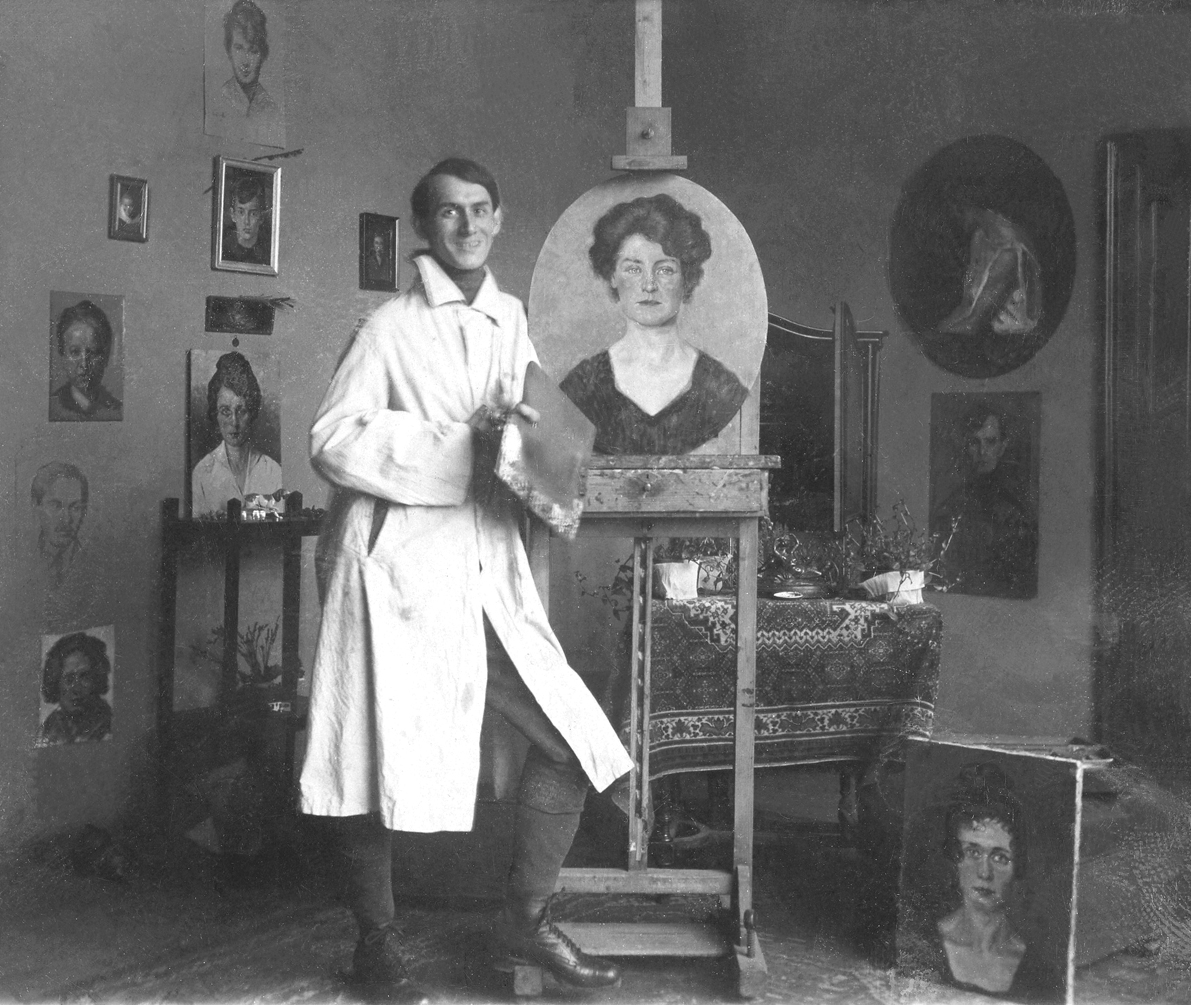
Albert Reuss in his studio, 1918

At the beginning of the First World War, he was obliged to undertake military service, but was allowed to do this in Vienna, due to his poor health, avoiding frontline duty. In 1915 he met his future wife, Rosa Feinstein (1891–1970), the daughter of Benjamin Feinstein, a merchant, and his wife Hinda née Prechner. Benjamin was born in Warsaw, Poland, which was at that time under the rule of Imperial Russia, making him and his family technically Russian. Rosa offered Albert the acceptance and encouragement he so desperately needed. Their marriage lasted for 55 years, and throughout that time she acted, in effect, as his agent and manager.

The couple were married in December 1916, but shortly after, Albert contracted tuberculosis and spent 18 months in a sanatorium. He took advantage of his confinement by drawing portraits of fellow patients, from which he began to establish a reputation as a portrait artist. Once he had recovered, the couple moved to an apartment at Möllwaldplatz 3, Vienna IV, where Albert established his studio, and in October 1922 they converted to Christianity. Also at this time, Albert started to use the surname "Reuss", though this change of name was not officially recognised until 1931. A young student, Sylvio Metzger, also moved into the apartment and developed a lifelong friendship with Albert and Rosa. A large body of correspondence between Sylvio and the couple has survived, and is stored, along with much other documentation, at "basis wien" in Vienna.

=== 1922–1938: Artistic development ===
During the 1920s, Reuss gradually established himself as an artist, working initially in portraiture, then developing an individual style of line drawing, which he called his linear work. In 1922, he exhibited a portrait at the Vienna Secession, (also known as the Union of Austrian Artists), and had his first solo exhibition at the Würthle Galerie in 1926. In 1930, a newspaper proprietor sponsored him to spend a year in Cannes, where he completed forty portraits and landscapes in oil, following which, he had a second solo exhibition at the Würthle Galerie in 1931. His exhibitions received good reviews in the Viennese press. Reuss subsequently became a member of the prestigious artists' association, the Hagenbund, with whom he exhibited on a number of occasions during the 1930s.

From 1926 to 1938, Reuss taught at the Fachlehranstalt für das Kleidungsgewerbe (The Specialist Teaching Institute for the Clothing Industry). In 1934, he also started working as a sculptor, creating, among other things, portrait busts of the Viennese councillor Johann Grassinger and of the actress Maria Eis, as well as a study of his wife Rosa, now in the Tel Aviv Museum of Art. Throughout this period, the couple developed a middle-class lifestyle, and filled their flat in Vienna with numerous books, artefacts and artworks, including two works by Egon Schiele. Thus, by 1938, Reuss had become an established and relatively prosperous painter and sculptor in Vienna. However, this period coincided with the rise of Hitler and the Nazi Party, and by this time, it became clear that Albert and Rosa would have to flee their home country.

=== 1938–1947: Flight from Vienna and first years in England ===
Following the Anschluss, the annexation of Austria to the German Reich in March 1938, the Reusses packed up all their possessions, including Reuss's artworks, into 38 crates and left these in storage, but almost everything was confiscated by the Nazis. With the help of Cornishman and Quaker, John Sturge Stephens (1891–1954), they escaped from Vienna to England, where they arrived in Dover penniless and empty-handed in August 1938. They had with them 10 Reichsmark (equivalent at the time to about £1 sterling), the maximum cash allowed to emigrants by the German authorities. Some members of the Reiss family were not so fortunate: Albert's brother Julius and his family and his sister Ernestine and her husband Roman Torn were murdered in the Holocaust. Reuss's remaining siblings emigrated to the United States.

After a brief stay in London, the Reusses were invited by John Sturge Stephens to his cottage in St Mawes, the springboard of their future life in Cornwall. Now in their late forties, they were obliged to build a new life and career from scratch. This proved to be a struggle, despite the significant help and support they received from numerous benefactors. Two local female painters in St Mawes offered Reuss the use of their studio, and in October 1938, a first exhibition was held there, followed by another exhibition at Lanham's Gallery in St Ives, Cornwall in December 1938. A third exhibition took place in August 1939 in Truro, Cornwall. However, after England's declaration of war against Germany in September 1939, Reuss was briefly interned as an "enemy alien" in June 1940 at a detention centre in Shropshire, which greatly distressed him. Following his release in August 1940, Albert and Rosa moved to Cheltenham, where they remained for the next eight years. A fourth solo exhibition took place in 1940 in Cheltenham, followed by a fifth in 1944, Reuss having produced over 200 paintings in the corner of his small living room. He also obtained a job as an art teacher at Dean Close School, an independent school in Cheltenham, which helped him to become more financially self-reliant, and to supplement his income as an artist. In 1947, Albert and Rosa Reuss were finally granted British nationality.

=== 1948–1975: The Mousehole years ===
In 1948, the Reusses moved to Mousehole, a fishing village in Cornwall, three miles beyond Penzance. Here they established the ARRA Gallery. Two flats (one to rent out), together with a studio and gallery, had been built for them by painter Ruth Adams (1893–1948), whom they had first met in 1938 at Lanham's Gallery in St Ives. Ruth was an ardent admirer of Reuss and was determined to bring her friends back to Cornwall, but she died in an accident just four weeks after their arrival, having left ARRA to the Reusses in her will. This inevitably caused gossip, and the entire episode was a most inauspicious way for Albert and Rosa to begin their new life in the village. Whereas they had been well accepted in St Mawes and Cheltenham, here they were largely to remain outsiders, despite a number of important new friendships. Much to his chagrin, Reuss's attempts to join the Penwith Society of Arts were unsuccessful, as is evident in correspondence with founding member Peter Lanyon. Nevertheless, now 60 years of age, Reuss continued to paint for the rest of his life, supported by the many friends and admirers he and Rosa had made over their first few years in England.

Whilst Albert painted, Rosa managed the ARRA Gallery together with their friend, Jeanne Day, and in collaboration with the Arts Council of Great Britain, hosting local artists such as Mousehole-born Jack Pender (1918–1998) and Alexander Mackenzie (1923–2002) of the St Ives School. The gallery eventually closed in 1956. Between 1945 and 1956, Rosa also organised numerous solo exhibitions of her husband's work in municipal galleries throughout England, particularly in the North, where many galleries still hold his works.

From 1953, Reuss held regular one-man shows at the renowned O’Hana Gallery in London. Jacques O'Hana was an international art dealer specializing in the French Impressionists. He was a colourful, larger-than-life character, who became Reuss's friend and mentor for the next 20 years until O'Hana's death in 1974.

Once ARRA closed, and there were no further exhibitions in the provinces, the couple started to experience considerable financial difficulties. They managed to obtain compensation for victims of political persecution and a small pension from the Austrian Government. They received additional financial support from Reuss's younger brother, Max Reiss, with whom Albert had a difficult relationship.

Albert and Rosa's last few years were also plagued by ill-health, with repeated hospital stays for both of them. In January 1970, Rosa died. She had spent her entire life caring for and supporting her husband and ensuring that he remained in touch with the outside world. Albert was inconsolable, but struggled on alone for a further five years, still painting. He became concerned about his artistic heritage, fearing that his paintings could be destroyed after his death.

He entered into a lengthy correspondence with the Austrian Press Secretary and later Deputy Ambassador in London, Dr Ingo Mussi (1935–2012), who arranged, with Jacques O'Hana, for some of Reuss's works to be sent to international galleries in Vienna and Israel. Following O'Hana's death in 1974, almost 200 works, including paintings, sculptures and drawings, remained in the London gallery. Ingo Mussi arranged, with the permission of the dying artist, for these to be sent to Vienna to be curated by an organisation called Euro Art.

In September 1975, Euro Art hosted an exhibition held on the premises of the Bawag Foundation, which had been established in 1974. Bawag was a bank which had close ties with the Social Democratic Party (SPÖ) and the Austrian Trade Union Federation (ÖGB). The bank actively sponsored the promotion of Austrian contemporary art and culture, and Albert Reuss's works were thus amongst the first to be exhibited by the Foundation, in full collaboration with the Socialist government of that time. The exhibition was called Bilder der Einsamkeit – Albert Reuss (Pictures of Loneliness – Albert Reuss), and was opened by the Education Minister Dr Fred Sinowatz, who was later to become Austrian Chancellor from 1983 to 1986. In his dying moments, Albert Reuss was finally able to experience success and recognition in his home country. He died on 4 November 1975 at the age of 86 years after a brief stay at a care home in Truro.

Contemporaries described Reuss as tall, slim, and elegant in manner, though accounts also noted a tendency toward aloofness. His conduct could be contradictory; while widely regarded as charming and personable, he at times alienated supporters with impulsive actions, including writing inflammatory letters to those assisting him. Nevertheless, Reuss and his wife Rosa maintained a broad circle of loyal friends and advocates who provided sustained support throughout their lives.

== Works ==
During the early 1950s, when Reuss was exhibiting in galleries in the North of England, he occasionally gave talks in an attempt to explain his work. An article was published on 11 November 1951 (newspaper unknown) entitled Artist Comes to ‘Explain’ where Reuss is quoted as having described three stages in the development of his art:

″Gateshead's Shipley Art Gallery ... includes pictures representing each of the three important stages through which Reuss's artistic life has passed from early pencil drawings, in which his striving after the essence of his subject was first observable, through the translation of this essence into oils, then to his later more uncompromising works.″

His earlier linear work of the 1920s was characterised by drawings which used a few brief pencil strokes to invoke recognisable images. This gave way to detailed and colourful oil paintings of landscapes, still lifes and figures, influenced by the expressionist Carinthian school of painting. This was a style he first developed during his period in Cannes, using a palette knife and “iridescent and opalescent colour”, for example The Carinthian Family (Die Kärntner Familie) (1932; private collection). This body of work was well received by the Viennese art critics of the 1930s, but following his exhibition in Vienna in 1975, his earlier work was described as "conventional", whilst he was thought to have "found himself" during his exile in England. Indeed, following his exile, there was an immediate change in Reuss's work into a style which could loosely be called Surrealism; his oil paintings now became simplified and muted with much cooler colours. Figures often looked sad or listless, or were portrayed with their backs turned. Compare for example Woman Reading with Mother-In-Law's Tongue, a portrait of Rosa (1935; Newlyn Art Gallery) with Woman Reading (1942–1947; Newlyn Art Gallery). After moving to Mousehole in 1948, bleak landscapes started to appear, with broken fences and walls, and trees stripped of foliage. The art critics of the 1950s commented in particular on the beauty and simplicity of these paintings, the economy of line, and the artist's considerable draughtsmanship. Some also saw in Reuss's work a certain spiritual quality. In later years, Reuss's paintings became ever more desolate, and the figures started to disappear. Where figures were present, these looked abandoned, like flotsam on the beach. This is particularly evident in Figure and Tree Stump originally titled Self-Portrait in the Open (1967; Newlyn Art Gallery). Often random objects such as corrugated iron and boulders appeared in the landscape, and sometimes even penetrated into rooms, for example Interior II (1971/72; Newlyn Art Gallery).

An apt description of Reuss's post-Vienna work appears on the Kunsthandel Widder Gallery's website

Reuss’s artistic output is very much informed by his biography. Objects, floating relinquished through space and having lost any foothold, predominate his imagery… Ripped out of their natural context, those objects tell the story of a voyage, of a kind of abandonment of an object that does not fit in its new environment. In Reuss's artwork, style and choice of subject-matter invoke an association with Surrealism. Dali and Chirico are but the two most important artists [who] bring to mind Reuss's artwork. Reuss's depiction of people has a similarly estranged air about them as those of his objects. Taken out of context, of time, of place, the pictured people appear oddly strange. Melancholic and lonely, but also calm and gentle, Reuss's creations remind the viewer of the art of Josef Floch.

There can be no doubt that these works were an expression of Reuss's mental state, of the extreme melancholy and despair that he had suffered throughout his life, but most especially the trauma he had experienced as a consequence of his exile, culminating in the Pictures of Loneliness of his final years.

== Estate ==
During the last few months of Reuss's life, Dr Mussi urged the ailing artist to appoint an heir, and to make it clear to whom he wished to leave his life's work. He suggested the possibility of leaving it to a public collection in Austria. Frail and confused, Reuss did not understand what was needed, and probably thought that by sending the bulk of his works to Vienna, he was doing just that. Consequently, there was no specific clause in his will naming an heir for his artistic works, though he was clear concerning his other assets, having written his will some years earlier with Rosa. All his artwork therefore went to the named residuary beneficiary, Miss Norette Reed, who had been a friend of Albert and Rosa for many years, and was an ardent admirer of Reuss's work. Norette was not expecting this gift, and in fact had donated her own collection of 31 Reuss paintings to the Newlyn Orion Gallery (now Newlyn Art Gallery) in June 1975, a few weeks before Reuss's death, specifying that this was to be kept as a permanent collection and not for sale. This became known as the Norette Collection. She now inherited those paintings still remaining at ARRA, Reuss's studio and home in Mousehole, as well as those which had been transferred to Vienna. She was happy for the works in Vienna to remain there, as this had clearly been Reuss's wish, but resolved in June 1977 that she would also donate to the Newlyn Orion all the unsold works which she had inherited, both those in Vienna as well as those which had remained in England. However, in January 1979, Reuss's works still in Vienna were unexpectedly returned to Cornwall. John Halkes, the director at that time of the Newlyn Orion, was delighted with these new acquisitions, some of which were from Reuss's Vienna period. In an interview with Susan Soyinka, Reuss's biographer, in October 2016, he said: "I thought the sensible thing to do was to cream off some of the better ones and add them to the Norette Collection ... Meanwhile … we didn’t have storage ... so (the remainder) were steadily exhibited and sold over the years." The remaining works, available for sale, now became known as the Vienna Collection, which in later years was retitled the Reuss Collection.

John Halkes was keen to honour Norette Reed's expressed wishes to raise Reuss's artistic profile and to ensure that a biography would be written. True to his word, he mounted several exhibitions during the 1970s and 1980s, not only at the Newlyn Orion but also at galleries in Plymouth and Bristol. In 1984, Halkes gave Reuss's written estate to a young German art student, Lioba Reddeker (1961–2011), who intended to write a biography, but was unable to complete this. Following her death, the entire documentation, including Lioba's research papers, was passed to ″basis wien″, a database of Austrian artists which she had founded.

Norette Reed died on 10 June 1991 and bequeathed one third of her residual estate to the Newlyn Orion. When John Halkes left the gallery in 1990, Reuss's works were put into storage and, apart from a further exhibition in 1992, were rarely seen for almost three decades.

== The future of exile art ==
In recent years, there has been a renewed interest in the “lost generation” of emigrated artists, including Reuss, in Austria and Germany, and indeed there are a number of galleries in Vienna and Berlin which specialize in exiled artists. Reuss's work featured in two hugely successful exhibitions called Die uns verließen (The Ones Who Left Us), held in Vienna in 1980, and Art in Exile, held in 1986 in several venues in Europe, including London. More recently, his works have featured in the Leopold Museum in the 2007 exhibition Zwischen den Kriegen. Österreichische Künstler 1918–1938 (Between the wars: Austrian artists 1918-1938), in 2015 as part of The Bigger Picture at the Penlee House Gallery and Museum in Penzance, and in 2016 at the Tel Aviv Museum of Art, Israel. His work is also represented in Thomas B Schumann's large collection of exile art in Germany, and Herr Schumann used one of Reuss's paintings, The Art Critic, on the cover of a book published in 2016, Deutsche Künstler im Exil 1933 bis 1945, (German Artists in Exile 1933 to 1945).

Monica Bohm Duchen, the organiser of the 1986 Art in Exile exhibition, is in the process of organising a major national event called Insiders/Outsiders, a nationwide arts festival planned for 2019 to celebrate the contribution of refugees from Nazi Europe to British culture. There are plans to exhibit some of Reuss's work at a few galleries in Cornwall as part of this project.

== Remembering Stone ==
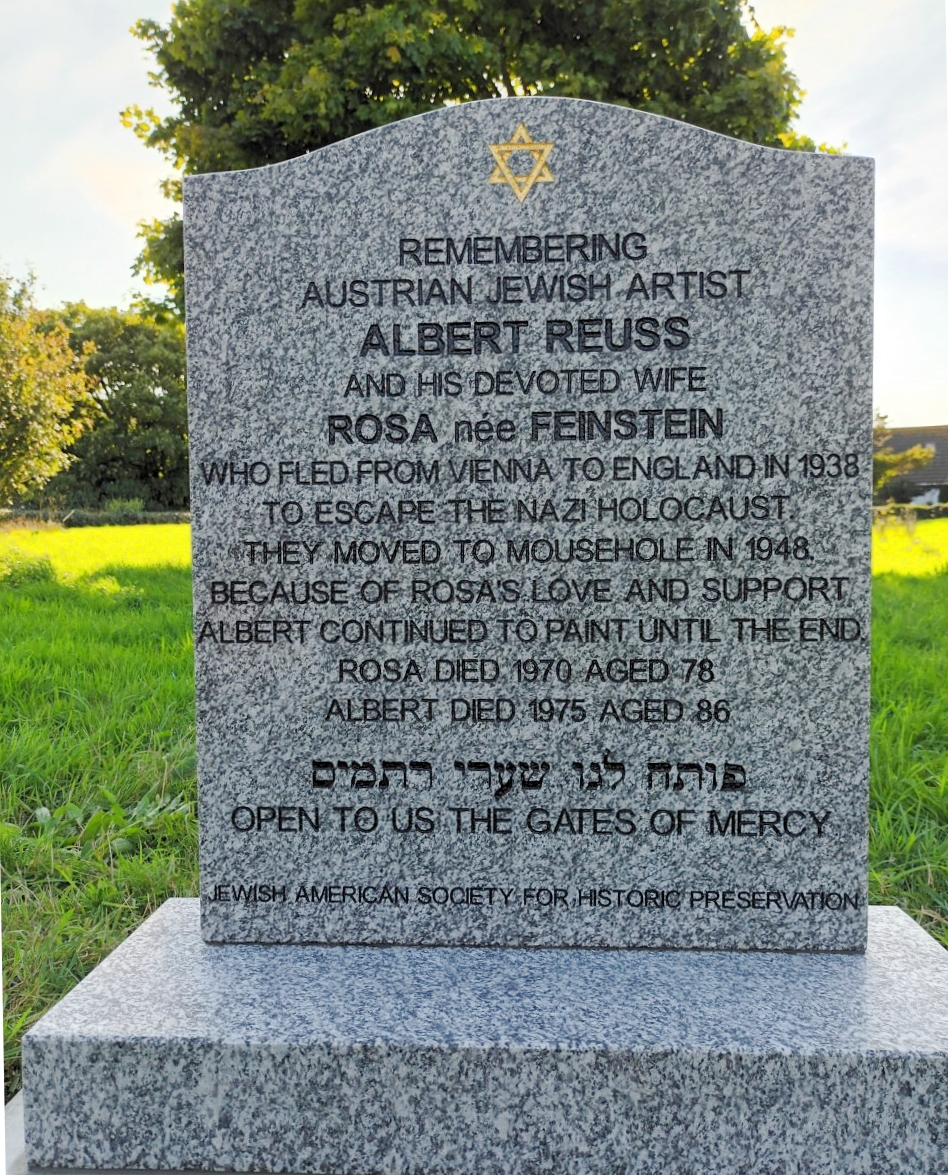
Remembering Stone for Austrian Jewish Artist - Albert Reuss

In September 2022, a Remembering Stone for Albert and Rosa Reuss was placed in The Cholera Field, one of four cemeteries in the Cornish village of Paul, half a mile inland from the coastal village of Mousehole. The cemetery belongs to St Pol de Léon Church, Mousehole Lane, Paul, Penzance. The Remembering Stone is adjacent to a Memorial Tree planted by the Association of Jewish Refugees (AJR), U.K., on 30 January 2022. The Tree is one of the "80 Trees for 80 Years" campaign commemorating the AJR's 80th anniversary, and is in honour of the villagers of Mousehole and Paul who, in 1940, took in over 100 Jewish evacuee children from Jews' Free School in the East End of London, to help them and their families escape the bombing during World War Two. Following his death in 1975, Albert Reuss's remains were cremated and scattered to the sea. During the 1920s and 1930s, Reuss became an established artist in his native Austria, but following his exile to England in 1938, he lost some members of his family, all of his possessions, and his reputation as an artist, because of his Jewish heritage. In the U.K., he achieved some fame and recognition during his lifetime, but became forgotten following his death. The 2022 Remembering Stone was a joint effort by Susan Soyinka, Reuss's biographer, and St Pol de Léon's Church, Paul, near Penzance, with the financial support of the Jewish American Society for Historic Preservation.

Inscription

                                                  (Star of David)
                                                    Remembering
                                               Austrian Jewish Artist
                                                    ALBERT REUSS
                                                 and his devoted wife
                                                  ROSA née FEINSTEIN
                                         who fled from Vienna to England in 1938
                                           to escape the Nazi Holocaust.
                                          They moved to Mousehole in 1948.
                                         Because of Rosa's love and support
                                       Albert continued to paint until the end.
                                              Rosa died 1970 aged 78
                                             Albert died 1975 aged 86
                                                 פותח לנו שערי רחמים 
                                             Open to us the Gates of Mercy
                                     Jewish American Society for Historic Preservation

== Solo exhibitions ==
- 1926, 1931: Würthle Gallery, Vienna
- 1938: St Mawes, Cornwall
- 1938: Lanham's Gallery, St Ives, Cornwall
- 1939: Gas Company Showroom, Truro, Cornwall
- 1940, 1944: Cheltenham Art Gallery and Museum, Gloucestershire
- 1945: Royal Birmingham Society of Artists, New Street Gallery, Birmingham
- 1945: Laing Art Gallery and Museum, Newcastle upon Tyne
- 1945: Salford Museum and Art Gallery
- 1947: Turner House Gallery, Penarth, Wales
- 1948: Royal Cornwall Polytechnic, Falmouth, Cornwall
- 1949, 1951, 1956: Studio ARRA, Mousehole, Cornwall
- 1950: Wolseley Room, Hove Public Library, Brighton, Sussex
- 1950: Public Library, Museum and Art Gallery, Darlington, North East England
- 1951: Bankfield Museum, Halifax, West Yorkshire
- 1951: Shipley Art Gallery, Gateshead
- 1952: Public Library and Museum, South Shields, North East England
- 1953: Victoria Park Museum, Keighley, West Yorkshire
- 1953: Batley Art Gallery, Batley, West Yorkshire
- 1956: Heffer Gallery, Cambridge
- 1953, 1954, 1956, 1958, 1962, 1964, 1966, 1968, 1970, 1973: O'Hana Gallery, London
- 1974, 1979, 1980, 1983: The Newlyn Orion, Penzanze, Cornwall
- 1975: Pictures of Loneliness, Bawag Foundation, Vienna
- 1977: Preston Art Gallery, Lancashire
- 1982: City Art Gallery, Plymouth, Devon
- 1985: Gallery Kuckucksmühle, Hilter, Germany
- 1989: Ginger Gallery, Bristol
- 1992: Newlyn Art Gallery, Penzance, Cornwall
- 2017: Newlyn Art Gallery, Penzance, Cornwall

== Group exhibitions ==
- 1922: Vienna Secession, Vienna
- 1925, 1931, 1932, 1933, 1935, 1935: Hagenbund, Vienna
- 1932: Chicago International Exhibition, United States
- 1940: Artists' International Association, London
- 1950: Artists of Fame and Promise, Leicester Gallery, London
- 1955: Friends of Israel, Ben Uri Gallery, London
- 1956: St John's College, Oxford
- 1956: Royal Academy of Arts, London
- 1963: Academy of Fine Arts Vienna
- 1968: Marc Serfaty Gallery, Los Angeles, United States
- 1971: Tel Aviv Museum of Art, Israel
- 1962 to 1973: Yearly Christmas exhibitions, O’Hana Gallery, London
- 1978: New Arts Centre, Sloane Street, London
- 1997: Austrian Gallery Belvedere, Vienna
- 2007: Between the Wars: Austrian Artists 1918–1938, Leopold Collection, Vienna
- 2015: The Bigger Picture, Penlee House Gallery and Museum, Penzance
- 2016: Tel Aviv Museum of Art, Israel

== Works in public collections ==
=== England ===
- Newlyn Art Gallery, Newlyn, Penzance
- Cheltenham Art Gallery & Museum, now The Wilson, Cheltenham
- Darlington Art Gallery
- Laing Art Gallery, Newcastle upon Tyne
- Salford Museum and Art Gallery, Greater Manchester
- Shipley Art Gallery, Gateshead
- Birmingham Museum and Art Gallery
- Bradford Museum and Galleries
- British Museum, Print Cabinet, London
- Fitzwilliam Museum, Cambridge
- Royal Pavilion and Museums, Brighton and Hove
- Victoria and Albert Museum, London

=== Austria ===
- Österreichische Galerie Belvedere, Vienna
- Albertina, Vienna

=== Israel ===
- Tel Aviv Museum of Art, Israel

=== United States ===
- Cleveland Museum of Art, United States

== Acknowledgements ==
- Albert Reuss's biographer, Susan Soyinka, carried out her research at the institutions listed in the external links below
- She also interviewed people who had known Albert Reuss, including his niece in the USA
- Documents originally written in German were translated into English by Margret Vince
