= Soyinka (surname) =

- Gender: Male
- Language: Yoruba

Origin
- Origin: Nigeria
- Meaning: I am surrounded or protected by sorcerers
- Region of origin: South West, Nigeria

Other names
- Derivatives: Shoyinka, Osoyimika, Oshoyimika

Soyinka is a Nigerian surname. It is a male name and of Yoruba origin, which means "I am surrounded or protected by sorcerers". The diminutive form can be Osoyimika or Oshoyimika, same meaning but in full form.

== Notable individuals with the name ==
- Grace Eniola Soyinka (1908–1983), Nigerian shopkeeper, activist, member of the aristocratic Ransome-Kuti family and mother of Wole Soyinka
- Kayode Soyinka (born 1957), Nigerian journalist, publisher, author
- Olaokun Soyinka (born 1958), Nigerian physician and son of Wole Soyinka
- Susan Soyinka (born 1945), social historian, researcher, author and wife of Kayode Soyinka (born 1944), younger brother of Wole Soyinka
- Wole Soyinka (born 1934), Nigerian playwright, essayist and Nobel laureate

== See also ==
- Shoyinka
