= Taubstummengasse station =

Vienna U-Bahn station

Taubstummengasse
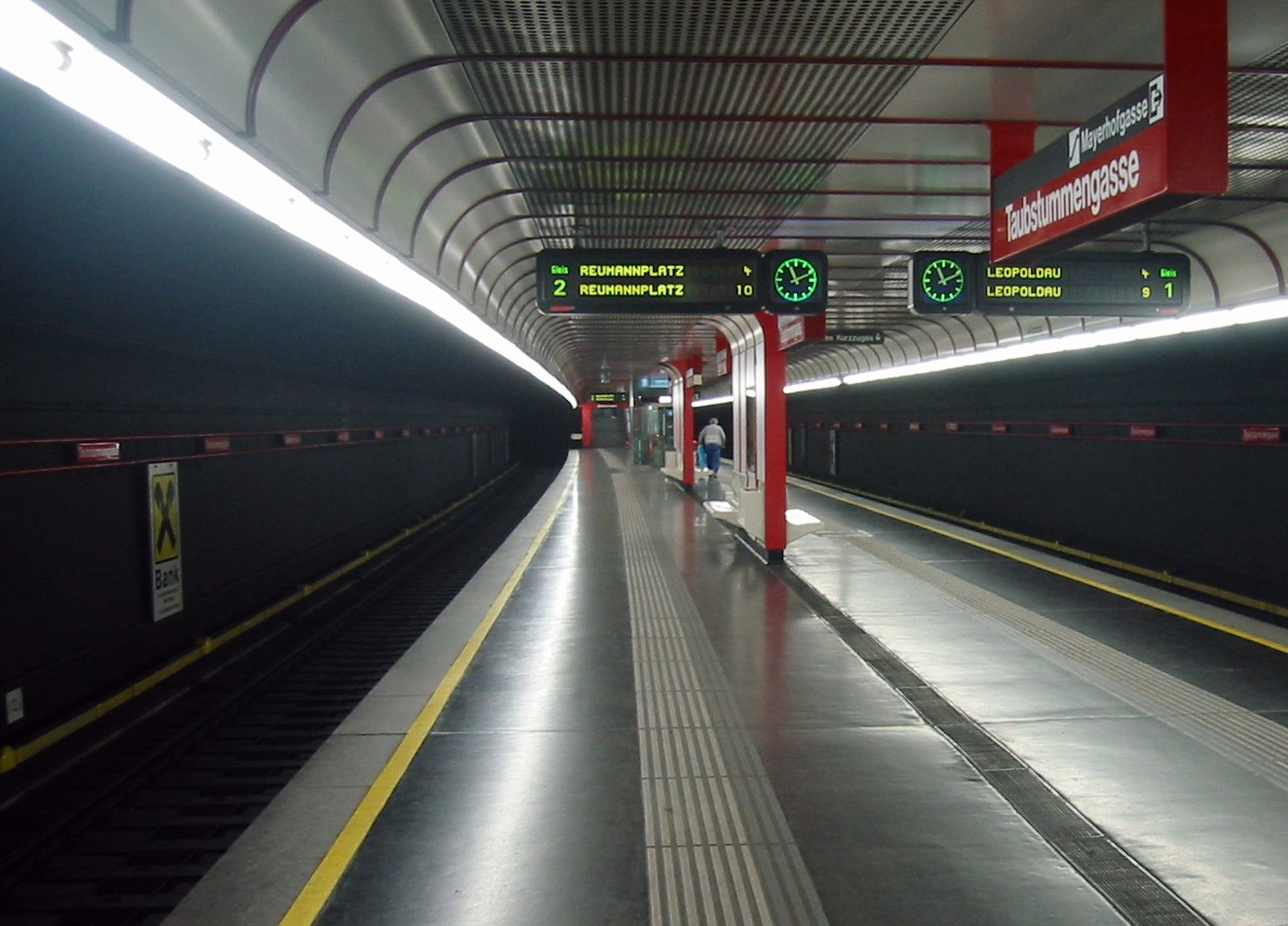

General information
- Location: Wieden, Vienna; Austria
- Coordinates: 48.1947°N 16.3699°E

History
- Opened: 25 February 1978

Services
Preceding station	Wiener Linien	Following station
Südtiroler Platz-Hauptbahnhof toward Oberlaa	U1	Karlsplatz toward Leopoldau
Location

Taubstummengasse is a station on U1 of the Vienna U-Bahn. It is located in the Wieden District. It opened in 1978.

== Nearby landmarks ==
- Anton-Benya-Park
- Diplomatic Academy of Vienna
- ORF Funkhaus Wien
