= Anton Hansch =

Austrian painter (1813–1876)

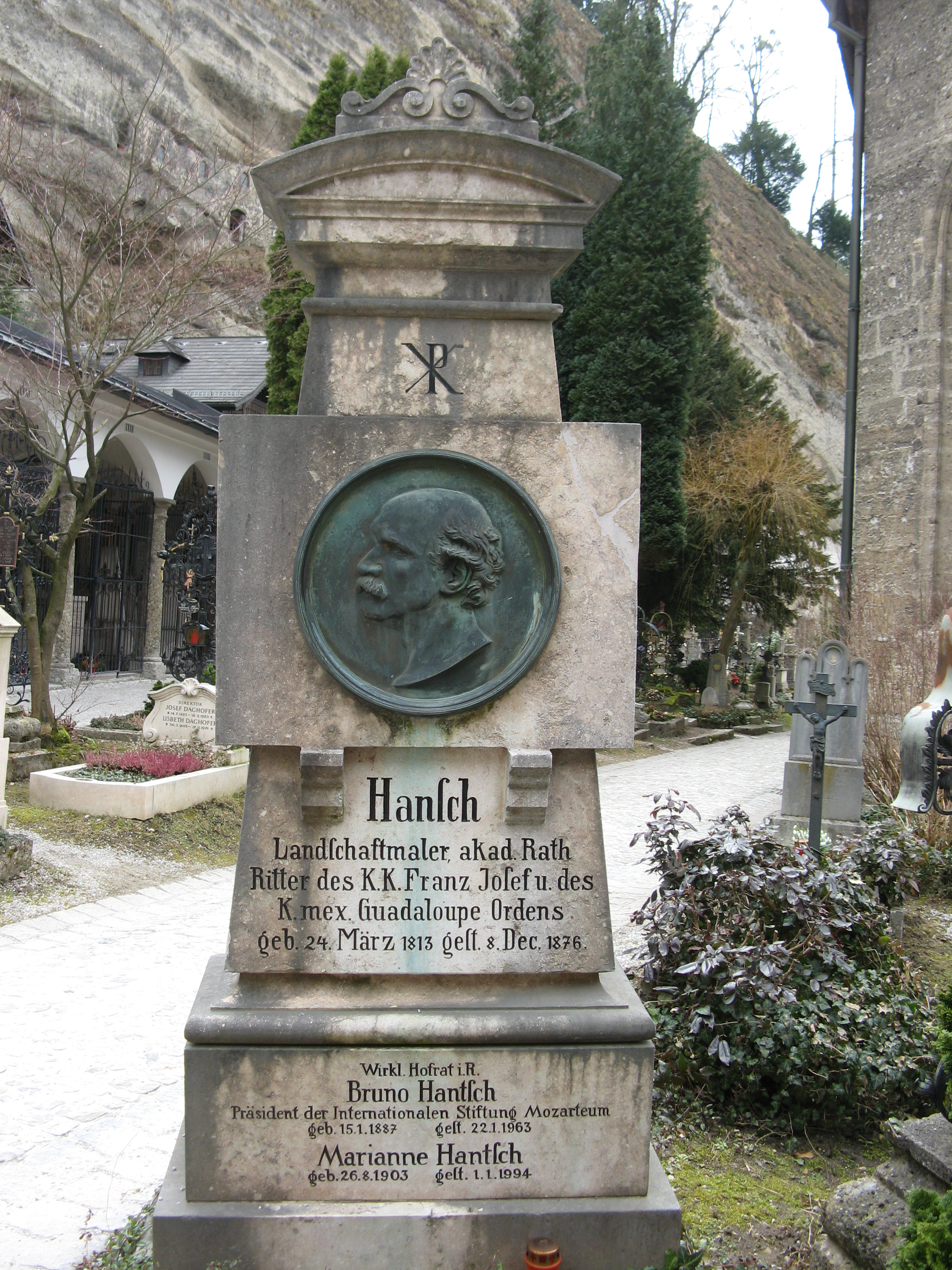
- Grave of Anton Hansch
- Born: 24 March 1813; Vienna, Austrian Empire
- Died: 8 December 1876 (aged 63); Salzburg, Austria-Hungary
- Style: landscape, realism

Anton Hansch (24 March 1813 – 8 December 1876) was an Austrian landscape painter.

His work is included in the permanent collections of the Kunsthistorisches Museum, the Museum of Fine Arts, Budapest; the Salzberg Museum, the Lichtenstein Museum Princely Collection, the Vienna Museum among other institutions.

== Early life ==
Hansch was born in Vienna on 24 March 1813, to a family who ran a fashion and artificial flower factory. They considered this a part of his training to attend the Vienna Academy to become a flower painter. Prior to 1837, before becoming a landscape painter, Hansch made artificial flowers.

== Biography ==
He was a pupil of Josef Mössmer at the Academy of Vienna from 1826–1836. After his schooling he traveled and studied in Germany, Austria, Belgium, Switzerland, and Italy.

His early works consist of landscapes that were painted in a baroque classicist style. Later, in the 1830s and 40s he began to paint in a more naturalistic tradition that then developed into a more idealized, heroic style.

In 1834, he traveled to Styria and to Salzkammergut. In 1836 two of his paintings, Parthie near Hieflau in Steiermark, and From the Neuwald Not Far From the Schneeberg received praise from the art community. One of these paintings was acquired by the Art Association, while the other was acquired by the Archduke Franz Karl. In 1937, the Archduke commissioned new paintings of Ischl. In 1938, he won two awards, the Grand Court Prize and the Rosenbaum Composition Prize, for two of his landscape paintings. In 1839, he was awarded first prize for landscape painting by the Vienna Academy.

In 1848 he received an appointment to the Academy of Fine Arts. In 1858, his painting Unter den Linden, a night scene, won a purchase prize by the Belvedere in Vienna.

In 1861, he became a member of the Vienna Künstlerhaus. In 1863, he traveled to Lake Langbath to paint winter scenes. One of these works was presented as a gift to the Emperor Franz Josef from his mother, the Archduchess Sophie. In 1867, he was awarded the Knight's Cross of the Franz Josef Order, and the same year he received the Order of Guadalupe prize from Emperor Maximillian I of Mexico. In 1868 he became a board member of the Vienna Academy. The following year, 1869, he exhibited over 180 of his alpine paintings at the Vienna Künstlerhaus.

In 1873, he suffered a financial crisis, and lost his fortune during the Panic of 1873. This event forced him to sell his oil sketches that he had intended to keep for his own private collection. Having traveled extensively earlier in life, he settled in Salzburg in 1875. There he focused on painting the surrounding landscapes, including the Golling waterfall, Berchtesgaden, Königssee, and Chiemsee lake. In 1875 the emperor purchased twelve paintings of the Hintersee. Later that year his eyesight began to fail. He died in Salzburg the following year, at the age of 63.

== Collections ==
Hansch's work has been widely collected in private and public collections. Notable museums that hold Hansch's paintings in their permanent collections include the Kunsthistorisches Museum, the Museum of Fine Arts, Budapest, the Salzberg Museum, the Lichtenstein Museum Princely Collection, the Vienna Museum the Dom Quartier Salzburg Residenzgalerie, among other institutions.

== Gallery ==
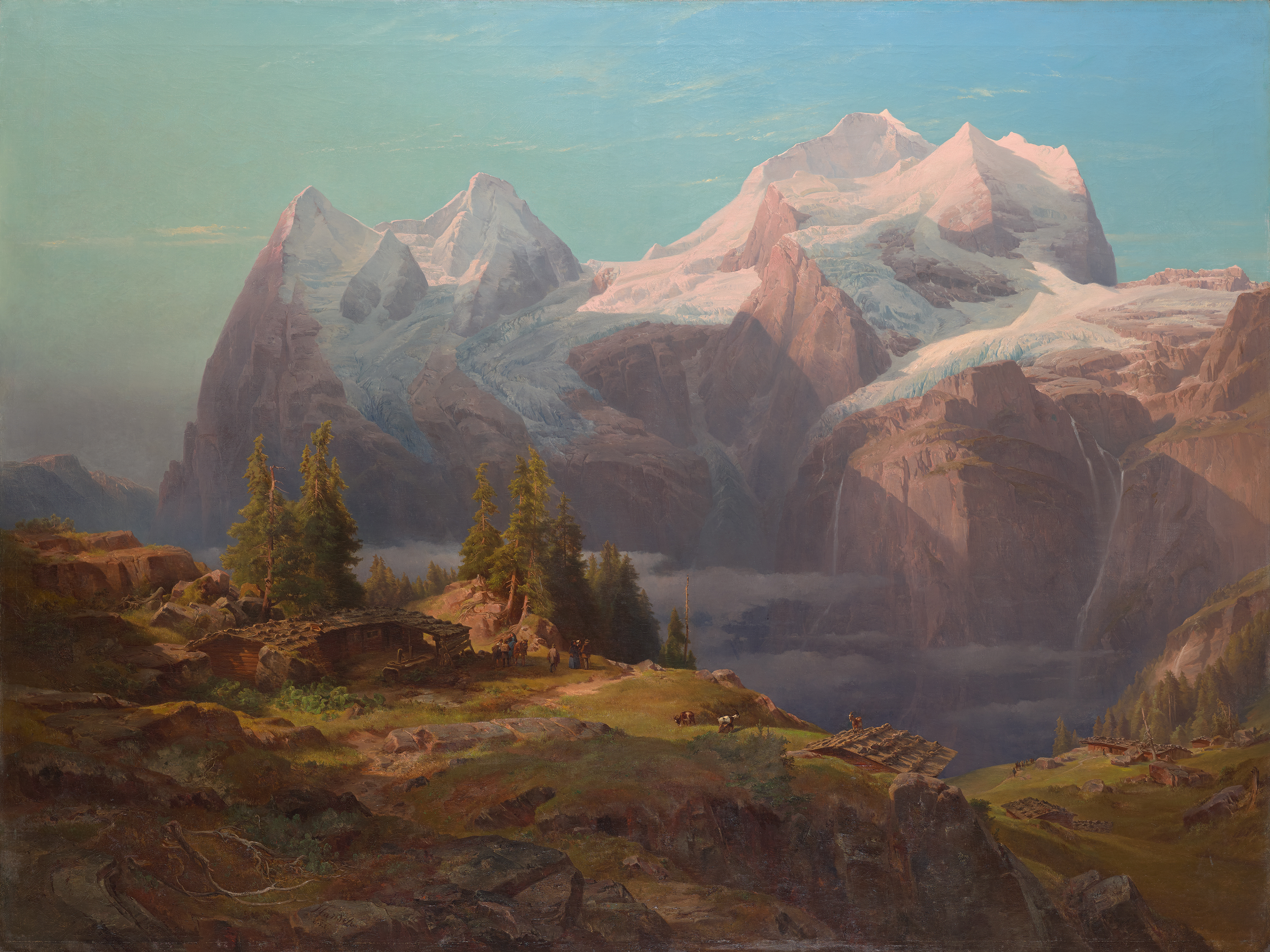
Anton Hansch, Wengeralpe im Berner Oberland (Jungfrau und Mönch), 1853

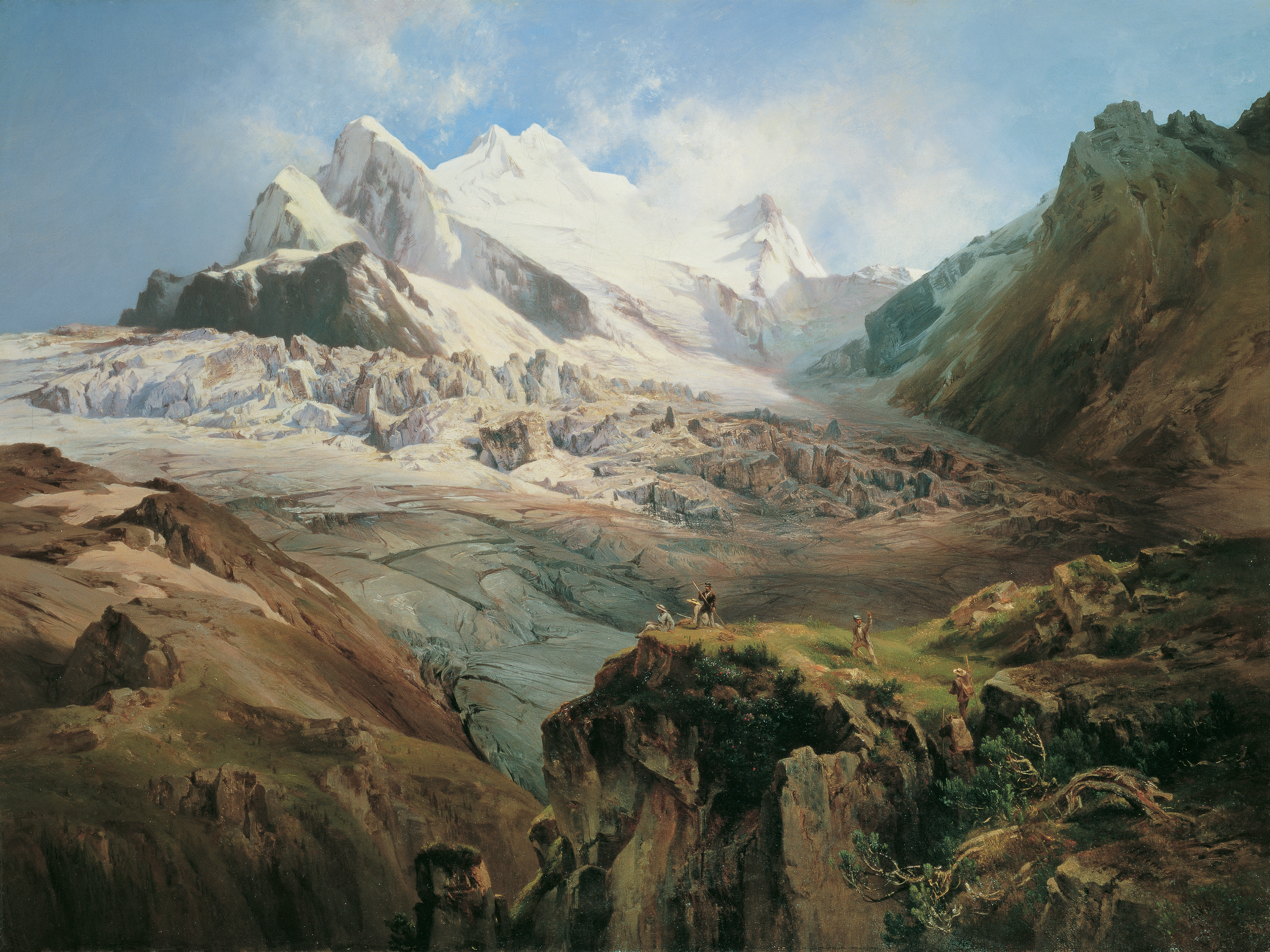
Anton Hansch, Der Stubaiferner in Tirol, c. 1875

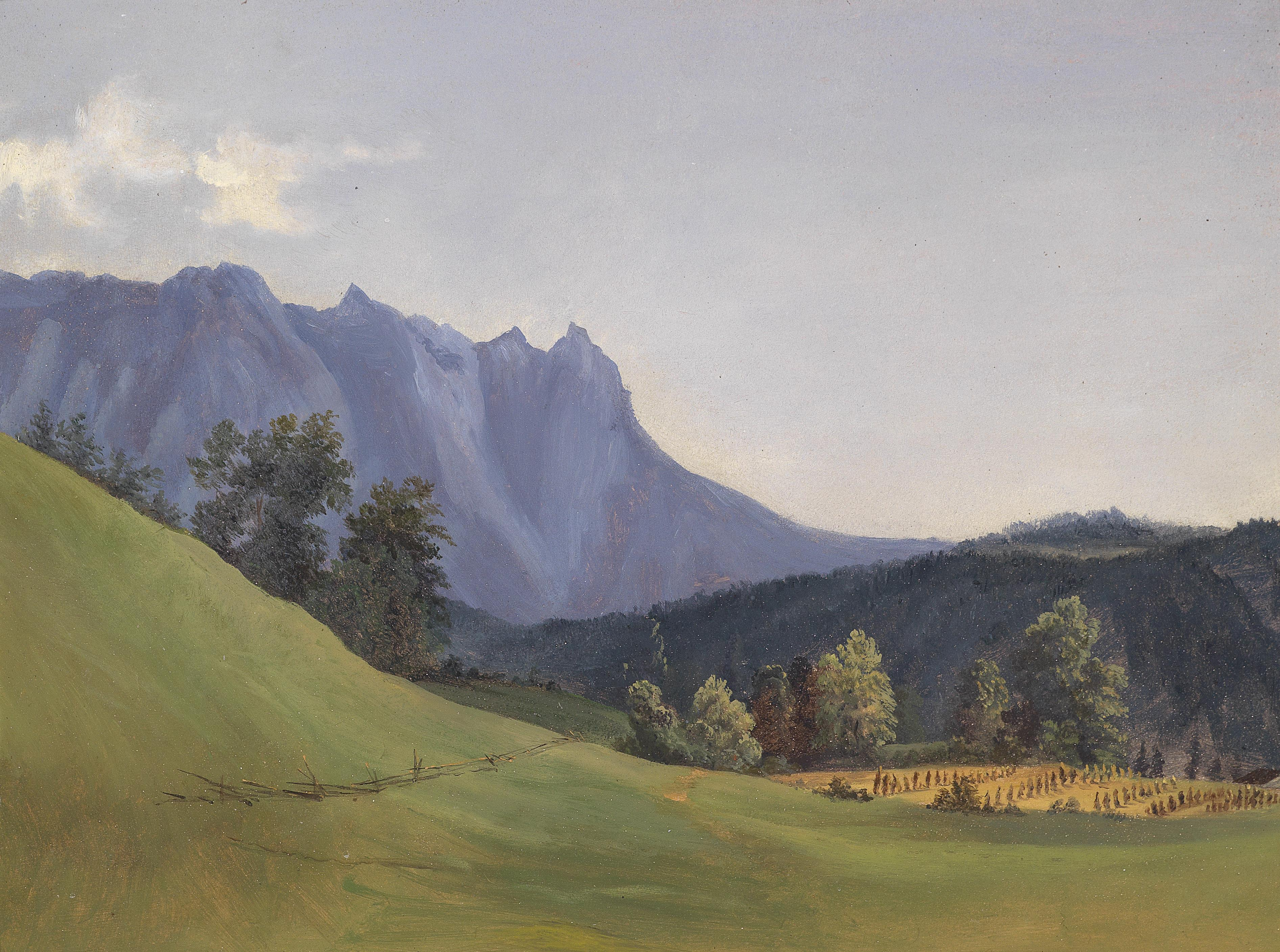
Anton Hansch, Sengsengebirge, 1876

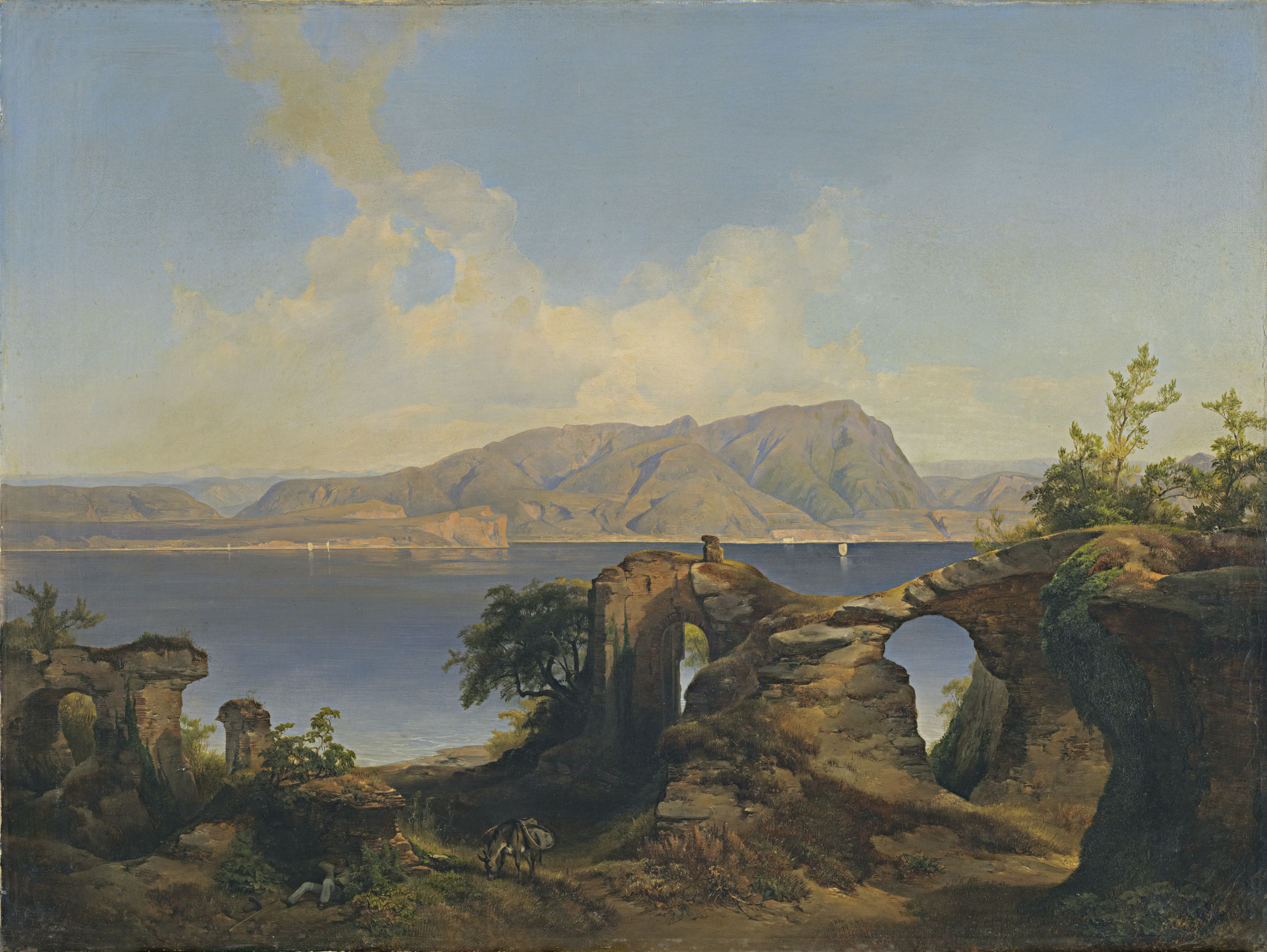
Anton Hansch, Blick auf den Gardasee, 1844

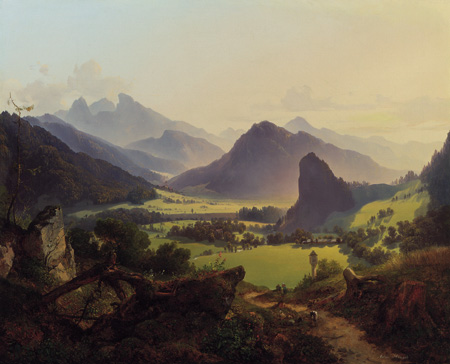
Looking into the Landl valley of Styria; 1837
