= Südtiroler Platz-Hauptbahnhof station =

Vienna U-Bahn station

Südtiroler Platz
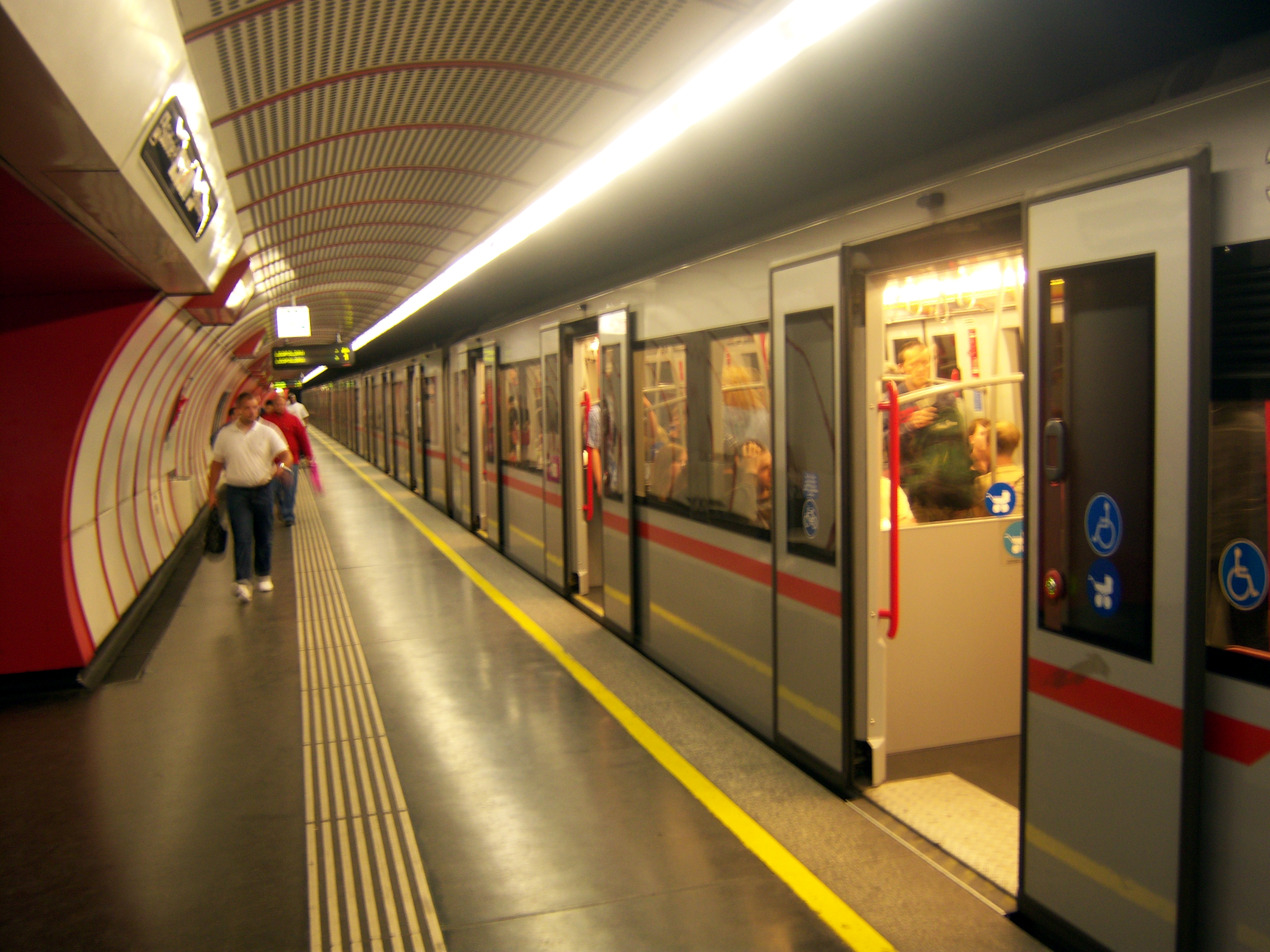
- Platform

General information
- Location: Favoriten, Vienna; Austria
- Coordinates: 48.1869°N 16.3737°E

History
- Opened: 25 February 1978

Services
Preceding station	Wiener Linien	Following station
Keplerplatz toward Oberlaa	U1	Taubstummengasse toward Leopoldau
Location

Südtiroler Platz-Hauptbahnhof is a station on U1 of the Vienna U-Bahn. It is also served by lines S1, S2, S3, S60 and S80 of the Vienna S-Bahn.

It is located in the Favoriten District. It opened in 1978. This station serves Wien Hauptbahnhof, Vienna's main station which partially opened in 2012 and became fully operational in 2016, replacing Wien Südbahnhof.

== Art ==
"SUED" by Franz Graf is found in this station.
