= Josef Feid =

Austrian painter (1806–1870)

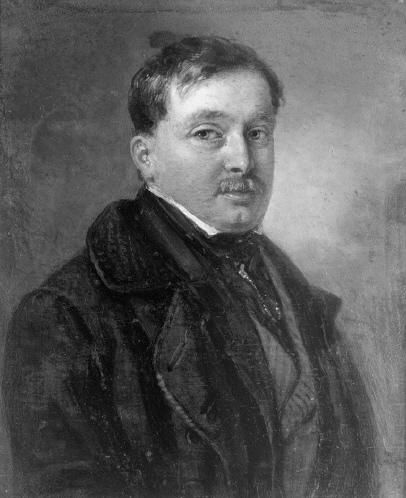
Self portrait, c. 1845

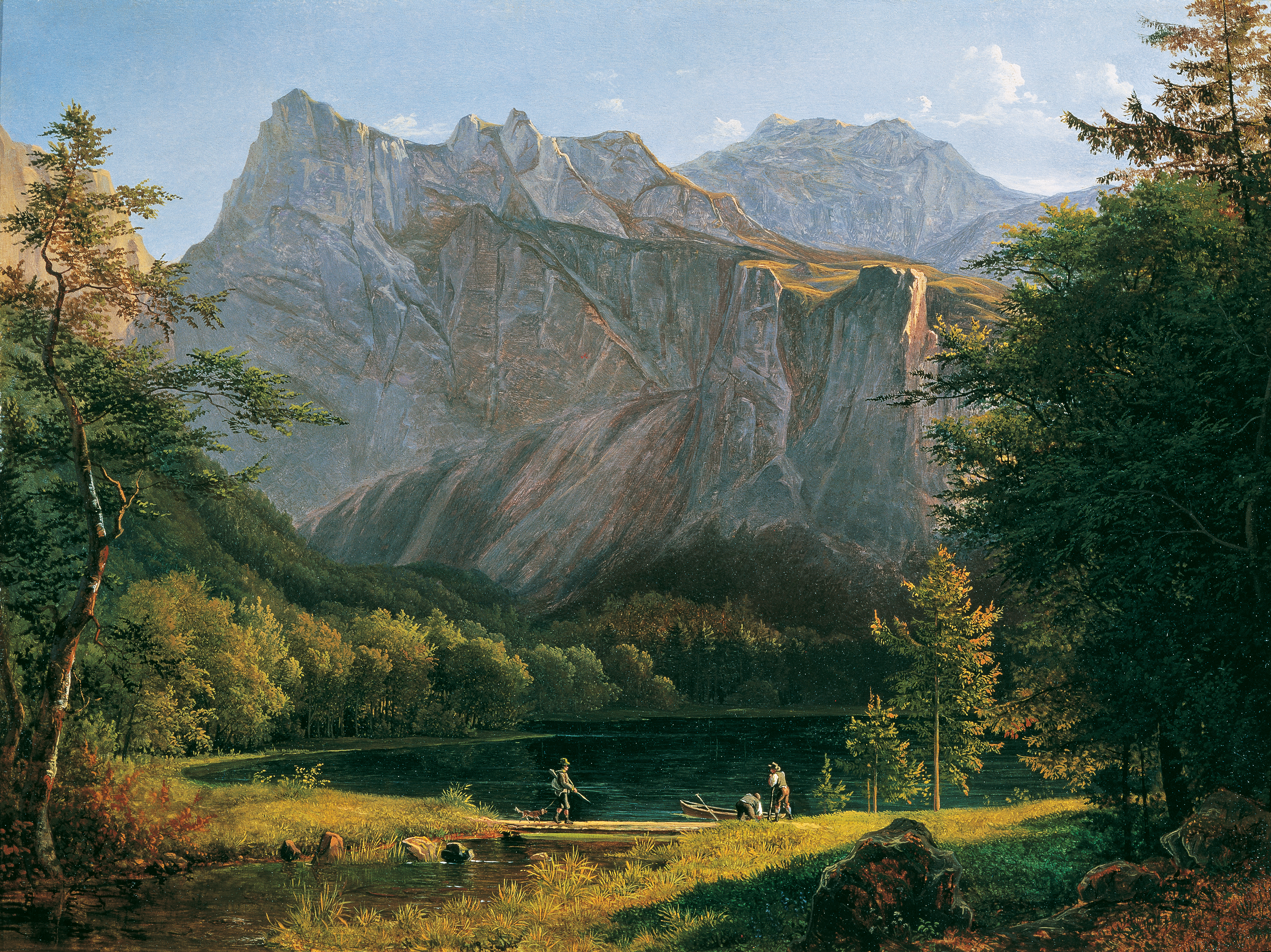
Upper Langbathsee, 1834, now in the Österreichische Galerie Belvedere

Josef Feid (21 February 1806 – 8 April 1870) was an Austrian landscape painter.

== Life ==
He was born in Vienna on 21 February 1806. He possessed a great talent in depicting foliage and forest life, and died in Weidling near Vienna on 8 April 1870. The following works by him are in the Vienna Gallery:

- A Scene in a Wood, with Nymphs bathing. 1828.
- A Study of the Schneeberg.
- A Forest Landscape, with a large Oak. 1841.
- A Landscape with an approaching Storm.
