= Shoyinka =

Shoyinka is a surname. Notable people with the surname include:

- Joe Tryon-Shoyinka (born 1999), American football player
- Olatunji Shoyinka (born 1962), Nigerian politician

== See also ==
- Soyinka (surname)
