= John Sturge Stephens =

Conscientious objector, historian

- Born: 26 June 1891; Ashfield, Budock, England
- Died: 12 July 1954 (aged 63)
- Education: St John's College, Cambridge
- Occupation: History lecturer at University of Birmingham
- Spouse: Helen Mary (Maisie) Rowat
- Children: 3
- Parent(s): John Gilbert Stephens and Isabel (née Sturge)

John Sturge Stephens (26 June 1891 – 12 July 1954) was born into a prominent family of Quakers (the Society of Friends) in Cornwall. During the First World War, he was a pacifist and conscientious objector and between the wars travelled extensively throughout Europe, on behalf of the Society of Friends, with a view to creating a peaceful future for the continent. In 1938 he helped numerous Austrian Jewish refugees to escape from Nazi persecution, and accommodated several of them at his homes in England.

== Life ==
John Sturge Stephens was born on 26 June 1891 at Ashfield in Budock, just outside Falmouth, Cornwall. Ashfield was the Stephens’ family home. He was the son of John Gilbert Stephens and Isabel (née Sturge). His father was a rope manufacturer, as had been several generations of the Stephens family, all staunch Quakers. There is a large Stephens’ family archive at Cornwall Record Office, about half of which consists of the correspondence and papers of John Sturge Stephens. Amongst these papers is a tribute by Philip Styles, who wrote:

John Stephens numbered among his antecedents and connections William Stephens (glassmaker), well known to collectors as a painter of Bristol China in George III’s time; and, on his mother’s, Samuel Prideaux Tregelles, the Biblical scholar, and the Birmingham Quaker philanthropist, Joseph Sturge. He was educated at Leighton Park School and St John's College, Cambridge, with a Classical Exhibition in 1910. After taking a First Class In Part I the Classical Tripos he became a Scholar of the College and a Second in Part II in June 1914. It was at Cambridge, under the influence of Terrot R. Glover, that his interest in History developed and he began to acquire, through travel in the vacations, his intimate knowledge of Germany.

In addition to his studies at St John's College, Stephens was also a gifted linguist able to speak several languages, which greatly assisted him in his later international work.

In 1927 he married Scottish-born Helen Mary (Maisie) Rowat (1901–1983). They had three children, Rachel, Nicholas and Christopher. Following his appointment as lecturer in history at Birmingham University, the family moved to Birmingham, but maintained two cottages in St Mawes, Cornwall.

Among his many interests, Stephens was, all his life, a keen naturalist and one of the last holidays he was able to take was spent in visiting the bird sanctuaries of Shetland. His earliest surviving letters, from War Relief camps in France, are full of botanical discoveries, and botany became one of his chief relaxations when his last illness confined him to his North Oxfordshire home near Witney, where he died on 12 July 1954 of a rare and distressing lung disease.

== First World War ==
Stephens embraced the Quaker Peace Testimony but was willing to work as a non-combatant. In May 1915 he went to France to join in the work being done by the Friends War Victims Relief Committee. He stayed there until April 1916. In September 1915 he returned to France to work for the Friends' Ambulance Unit (FAU). In May 1916 he resigned from the FAU because he objected to the way that the unit had been placed under military command. On his return to England he faced a Military Service Tribunal which granted him Exemption from Combatant Service conditional on agricultural work.

== Post-World War I ==
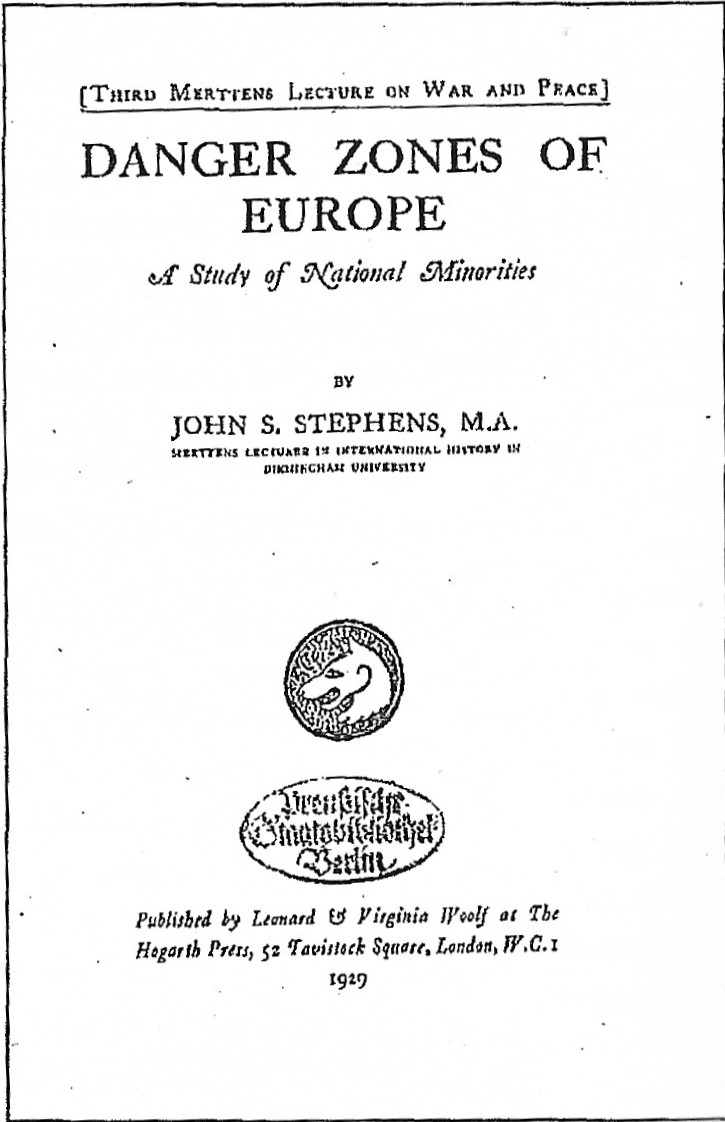
The frontispiece of Danger Zones (1929)

During the 1920s and 30s, Stephens travelled extensively throughout Europe, visiting a large number of countries, including Czechoslovakia, France, Germany, Holland, Italy (especially the South Tyrol with its German-speaking minority) and Poland, thus becoming heavily involved in European geopolitics of that period. His goal, together with his colleagues at the Society of Friends, was to help bring about peace in Europe. His travels and activities would have greatly enhanced his work as a History lecturer at Birmingham University.

In 1929, he wrote a visionary book, based on a lecture he had given, entitled Danger Zones of Europe: A Study of National Minorities and published by Leonard and Virginia Woolf at the Hogarth Press, which warned of the dangers to world peace of fascism and of treating linguistic and cultural minorities unfairly. This was in fact the third of the annual Merttens Lectures on War and Peace reissued in book form. On 6 July 1933, he wrote a letter to The Times entitled The Hitler Regime, where he warned of things to come.

During 1935, Stephens spent three weeks traveling around Germany trying to gauge the views of the locals about the impact of the Nazi regime. He recorded his findings in a nine-page handwritten document entitled Impressions of Germany, August 1935.

Stephens also set out his views in talks he gave to the Society of Friends, in letters he sent to the press, and in letters to his father, John Gilbert Stephens, who clearly took an interest in his son's international activities. During 1938, Stephens made several trips to Austria to help save Jewish and other victims of Nazi persecution, working with Emma Cadbury (1875–1965), who was an American Quaker committed to the international aspect of Friends’ work and was the American Secretary of the Friends International Centre in Vienna from 1924 to 1938. He also liaised with Josef Bürckel (1895–1944), a Nazi German officer heavily involved in the Anschluss, in an attempt to get his sanction for relief work to address the “burning problem of acute Jewish distress”. In a letter to his father dated 22 April 1938, he wrote:

The worst thing the Nazis have done in Austria is the expulsion of the whole Jewish population from the villages of the Burgenland near the Hungarian frontier. Hundreds of these wretched folk were summarily ejected from their homes and told to leave Germany.… Of course no foreign country will take them as France is taking the Spanish refugees. They have been so brutally maltreated (I spoke with an eye witness of their sufferings) that the truth is bound to be branded by the Nazis as atrocity-mongering.…

[T]he mental suffering of thousands upon thousands in Vienna is even worse in the long run ‒ countless gifted and quite unpolitical people ruined simply because of their Jewish or partly Jewish blood. The cultural life of Vienna will be annihilated.…

Stephens was referring here to the large numbers of highly qualified Viennese Jews who were obliged to flee their country: doctors, lawyers, scientists, academics, writers, musicians and artists. Among the many people whom he helped to escape from Austria was Viennese Jewish artist Albert Reuss and his wife Rosa, whom he mentions in the same letter:

I made friends with a charming painter and his wife who were in great despair, and he said I had restored their faith in God. He insisted on making me choose one of his paintings as a present to take back to England. So I took a beautiful landscape in Carinthia in oil. The good man wants to come to England, and I have promised to do all I can to help him find hospitality here till he can set about his painting and earn something.

Stephens was true to his word, not only helping the couple to escape, but also offering them a temporary home at one of his cottages in St Mawes. Furthermore, he also offered shelter to numerous refugees in his home in Birmingham. Indeed, Philip Styles recalled that during the 1930s, "many young men and women of different nationalities found a home or a meeting place in the friendly atmosphere of the Stephens’s house in Hagley Road."

== Career ==
In 1919 Stephens went with a group of Friends to Germany, where he spent most of his time during the early 1920s. The immediate task was the relief of post-war distress. However, Stephens's deepest interest was in the hopes of a peaceful and democratic future and it was so that he might get to know more intimately the problems and aspirations of German youth that he took a post as Lektor at the University of Frankfurt.

His work as French and German translator at a conference in Paris brought him into contact with Sir Raymond Beazley, at that time Professor of History at the University of Birmingham, who appointed him in 1925 to a special lectureship in International History established by Frederick Merttens. His duties involved the teaching of Workers' Educational Association (WEA) as well as University students. When the Merttens Lectureship lapsed in 1930 he became a full-time lecturer in the Department of History, a position which he held until he retired.

Stephens's great work at Birmingham was as a teacher, as his natural eloquence made him an impressive lecturer. One of his students said of him: "He had the rare gift of being able to bring his story to life as if he were living it. He was interested in persons and he lectured about persons, so that his lectures were like himself, full of life and humanity. To hear him lecture to a small group on the trial and execution of Charles I, or on the meeting of George Fox and Cromwell was a moving experience". There was much in seventeenth century England that called for his deepest enthusiasms and his special subject on ‘The Age of Cromwell’ became one of the most notable pieces of advanced teaching in the Birmingham History School.

He retired from his post at the University of Birmingham in 1951 and died only three years later.
