= Susan Soyinka =

British social historian, researcher and author

Susan Soyinka (née Fowler; born 27 October 1945) is a British social historian, researcher and author. A former educational psychologist, she became a writer of historical non-fiction on retirement.

== Background ==
Susan Soyinka was born in Nottingham in 1945. Her mother, Lucy Fowler née Smetana (1919–2003), was an Austrian Jewish refugee who came to England in 1938 to escape Nazi persecution. Lucy had been enrolled in the Faculty of Medicine at the University of Vienna but was expelled, along with other Jewish students, by the university authorities. After graduating from Keele University in 1969, Susan spent ten years of her early career in Ghana and Nigeria working as a teacher and lecturer. She married Kayode Soyinka, younger brother of Nobel Prize-winning writer, Wole Soyinka.

On her return to England, she retrained as an educational psychologist, and after discovering her Jewish roots, worked for nine years in the Jewish community in London. Following her retirement, she established a new career as a writer.

== Writing career ==
Susan Soyinka’s first book, From East End to Land’s End, describes the World War Two evacuation of about 100 children from Jews’ Free School (JFS) in the East End of London, to the Methodist village of Mousehole in Cornwall, where a Jewish school, JFS Mousehole, was established. A 70th anniversary reunion of Mousehole villagers and the evacuees was held in 2010.

Her second book, A Silence That Speaks, describes her Viennese Jewish family history, and the fate of several members of her family in the Holocaust. The book received an award in 2014 from the Jewish Genealogical Society of Great Britain (JGSGB).

Her third book, Albert Reuss in Mousehole: The Artist as Refugee, is a biography of Albert Reuss (1889–1975), a Viennese Jewish artist who fled to the UK from Nazi persecution in 1938.

Soyinka has written articles for a number of platforms including Art UK and New Statesman.

== Publications ==
- From East End to Land’s End. The Evacuation of Jews' Free School, London, to Mousehole in Cornwall during World War Two, Eliora Books 2013, ISBN 978-0957561410. First published by DB Publishing, 2010.
- A Silence That Speaks. A Family Story Through and Beyond the Holocaust, Eliora Books 2013, ISBN 978-0957561403. First published by DB Publishing, 2012.
- “Penzance Synagogue – A Brief History”, JCR-UK 2014
- Women of West Cornwall 1600 to 1945, Co-author, Penwith Local History Group 2016, ISBN 978-0995494008
- Albert Reuss in Mousehole: The Artist as Refugee, Sansom & Co 2017, ISBN 978-1911408161
- Growing up in West Cornwall, Co-author, Penwith Local History Group 2019, ISBN 978-0995494015
