= Wieden =

Coordinates: 48.19201°N 16.37130°E

Wieden Wiedn (Bavarian)
- 4th District of Vienna
- Coat of arms

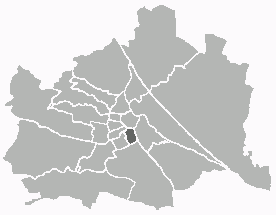
- Location of the district within Vienna
- Country: Austria
- City: Vienna

Government
  - District Director: Lea Halbwidl (SPÖ)
  - First Deputy: (SPÖ)
  - Second Deputy: Barbara Neuroth (Green)
  - Representation (40 Members): SPÖ 13, Green 11, ÖVP 5, NEOS 5, FPÖ 4, KPÖ 2

Area
  - Total: 1.80 km^{2} (0.69 sq mi)

Population (2016-01-01)
  - Total: 32,745
  - Density: 18,200/km^{2} (47,100/sq mi)
- Postal code: A-1040
- Address of District Office: Favoritenstraße 18; A-1040 Wien
- Website: www.wien.gv.at/bezirke/wieden/

Wieden (German pronunciation: [ˈviːdn̩]; Viennese: Wiedn) is the 4th municipal district of Vienna, Austria (German: 4. Bezirk). It is near the centre of Vienna and was established as a district in 1850, but its borders were changed later. Wieden is a small region near the city centre. After World War II, Wieden was part of the Soviet sector of Vienna for 10 years.

== History ==
The name Wieden was first recorded in 1137, and is thus the oldest Vorstadt (former municipality within the Linienwall) of Vienna. The main street (Wiedner Hauptstraße) is certainly even older. The district was the site of the former royal Summer residence, which was completed under Ferdinand II, and was expanded many times until Maria Theresa sold it to the Jesuits. Today it is the Theresianum, a prestigious private boarding school, while the Diplomatic Academy of Vienna resides in a wing of the building.

In the beginning of the 18th century, the development of Wieden as a suburb began. Many palaces and other buildings were built. Two small Vorstädte in the area of the present fourth district were Hungelbrunn and Schamburgergrund.

These three areas along with a number of others were incorporated into the city of Vienna as the fourth district on March 6, 1850. Because of social and economic differences, Margareten was separated from the fourth district to form the fifth district in 1861.

The so-called Freihaus, built in 1700 and the largest apartment building/tenement of the time, was located in this area, although by 1970 its state had deteriorated. The name has been rehabilitated in recent years to give an identity to the local bars, restaurants and independent retailers. During the occupation by the allies (1945–1955), Wieden was part of the Soviet sector of Vienna.

The Vienna University of Technology is located in this district with its main administration buildings being located in Karlsplatz and a nearby satellite campus in the 6th district across the Wienzeile.

== Famous residents ==
- Johannes Brahms (1833–1897), German composer, lived here
- Christoph Willibald Gluck (1714–1787), lived here
- Ferdinand Bloch-Bauer (1864–1945 ), sugar manufacturer and art lover, lived here (de)
- Karl Kraus (1874–1936), an Austrian writer and journalist, one of the foremost German-language satirists of the 20th century, lived here
- Rosa Mayreder (1858–1938), an Austrian freethinker, author, painter, musician and feminist
- Emanuel Schikaneder (1751–1812), a German impresario
- Johann Strauss II. (1825–1899), composer of light music, particularly dance music and operettas, lived here
- Nicholas Treadwell (1937), gallerist, art collector and performer
- Cäcilia Cordula Weber, née Stamm (1727 – 1793), the mother of Constanze Weber, wife of Wolfgang Amadeus Mozart, died here
- Josephine Haas (later Haas von Längenfeld-Pfalzheim) (1783, Burglengenfeld - 1846), a female German-Austrian philanthropist, lived and died here (de)

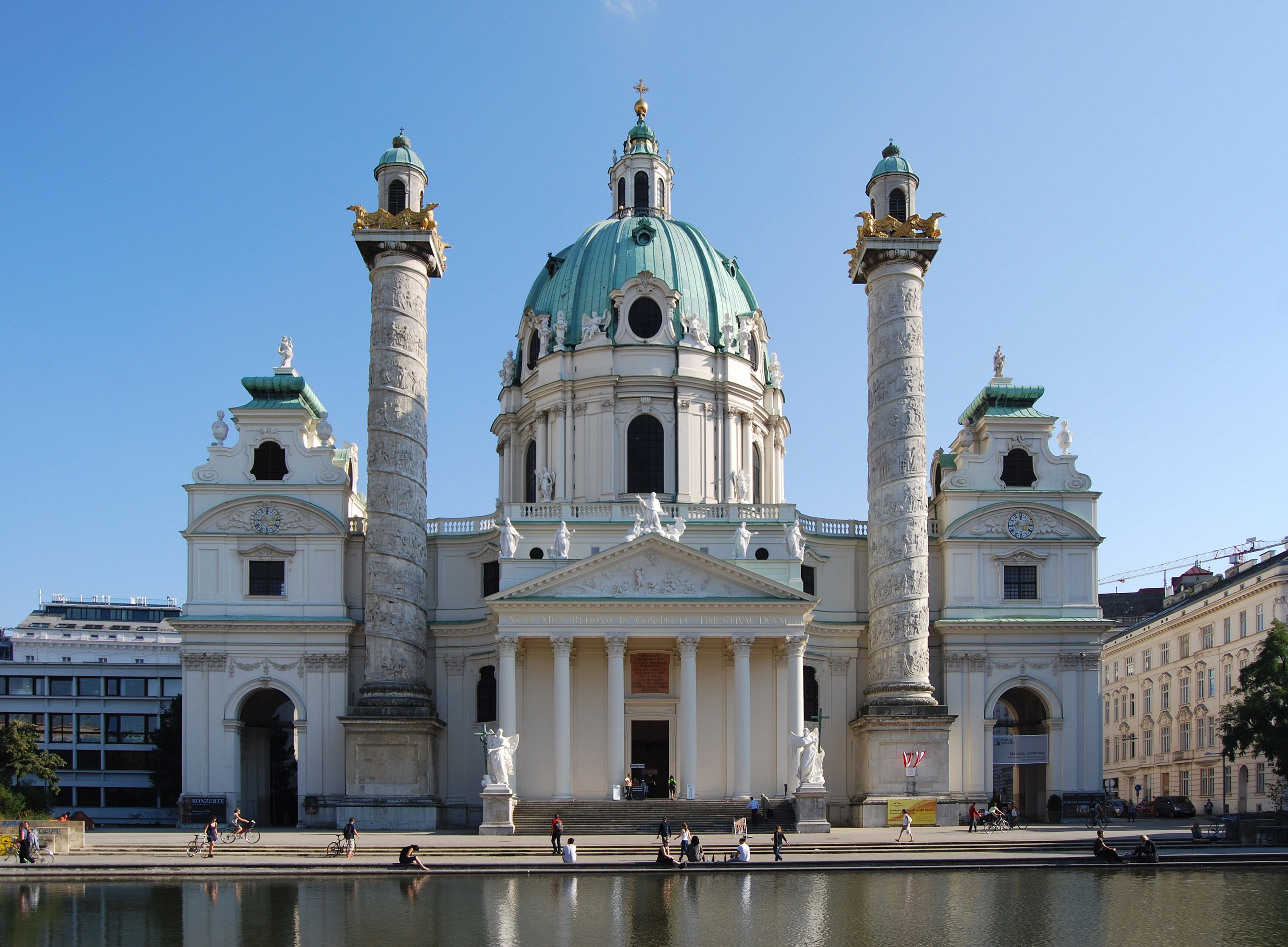
St. Charles's Church

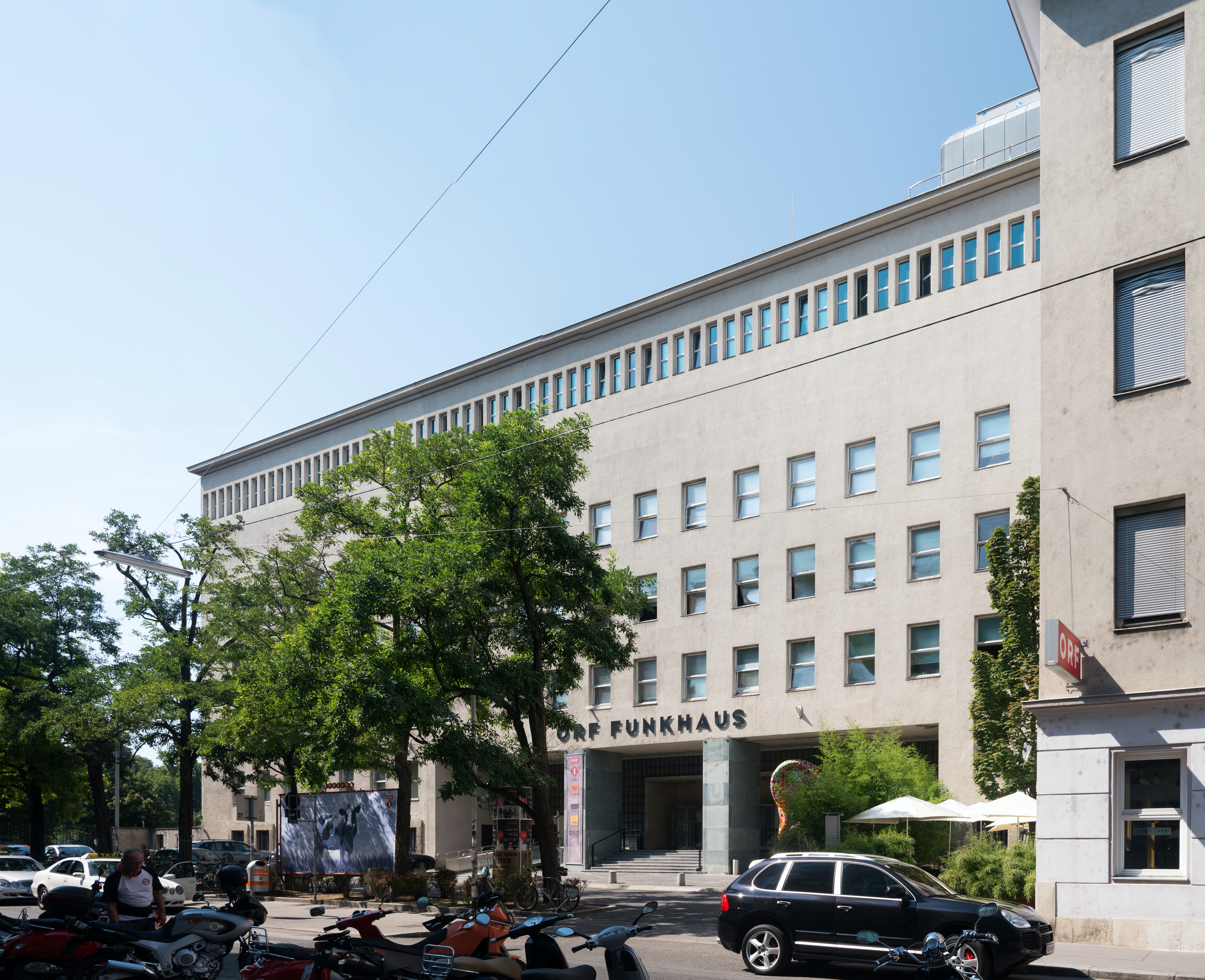
The ORF Funkhaus (radio building) is located in Wieden

- Joseph Ulrich Danhauser (1780 - 1829), Austrian furniture maker, father of Josef Danhauser (de)
- Josef Feid (1806–1870, Weidling), Austrian painter, born here (de)
- Adalbert Nikolaus Fuchs (1814, Wieden - 1886, Kritzendorf), Austrian agricultural scientist, born here (de)
- Karl Lueger (1844–1910), Viennese mayor, born here
- Johann Matthias Ranftl (1804–1854), Austrian artist, born here (de)
- Johann Heinrich Steudel (1825–1891, Weikersdorf), politician, born here (Schaumburgergrund, now Wieden) (de)

== Sights ==
- Karlskirche: (St. Charles's Church) a famous and special baroque church
- Naschmarkt: the famous and the largest market of Vienna (fruits and vegetables and more recently bars and restaurants)
- Karlsplatz Stadtbahn Station: Art Nouveau building constructed by Otto Wagner
- Theresianum
- Vienna Museum: museum covering Vienna's history
- ORF building The headquarters of the national broadcaster's radio stations.
- Vienna University of Technology
