= Langbathseen =

Lakes in Upper Austria

Vorderer Langbathsee
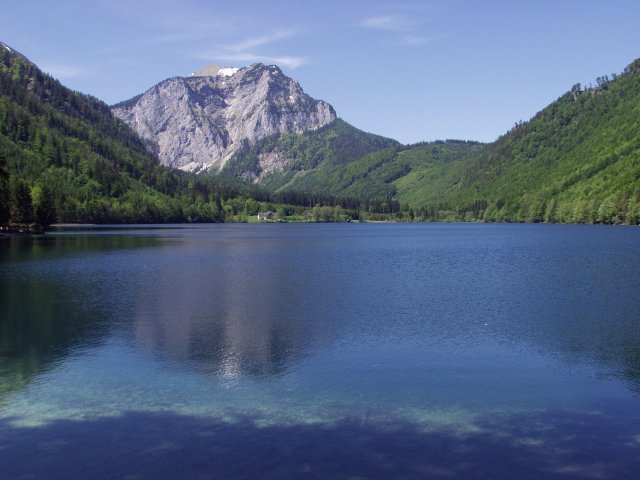

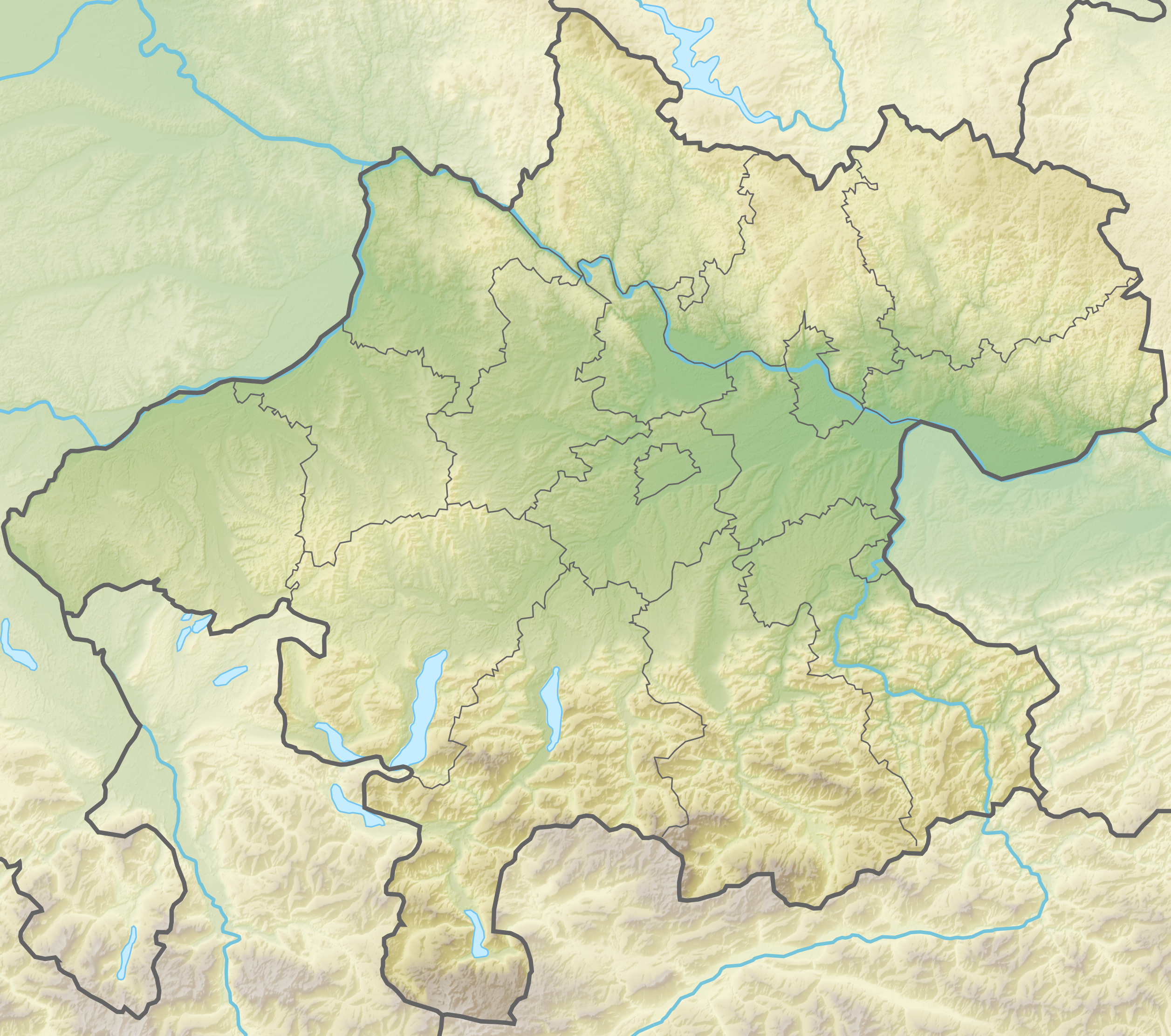
- Location within Upper Austria
- Location: Ebensee
- Coordinates: 47°50.1′N 13°40.87′E
- Lake type: Oligotrophic
- Primary inflows: Pfrillenbach, aquifers
- Primary outflows: Langbathbach
- Catchment area: 13.8 km^{2} (5.3 sq mi)
- Basin countries: Austria
- Designation: Nature reserve
- Max. length: 1.1 km (0.68 mi)
- Max. width: 500 m (1,600 ft)
- Surface area: 33 ha (82 acres)
- Max. depth: 33 m (108 ft)
- Water volume: 5,500,000 m^{3} (4,500 acre⋅ft)
- Residence time: 0.87
- Surface elevation: 664 m (2,178 ft)

Hinterer Langbathsee
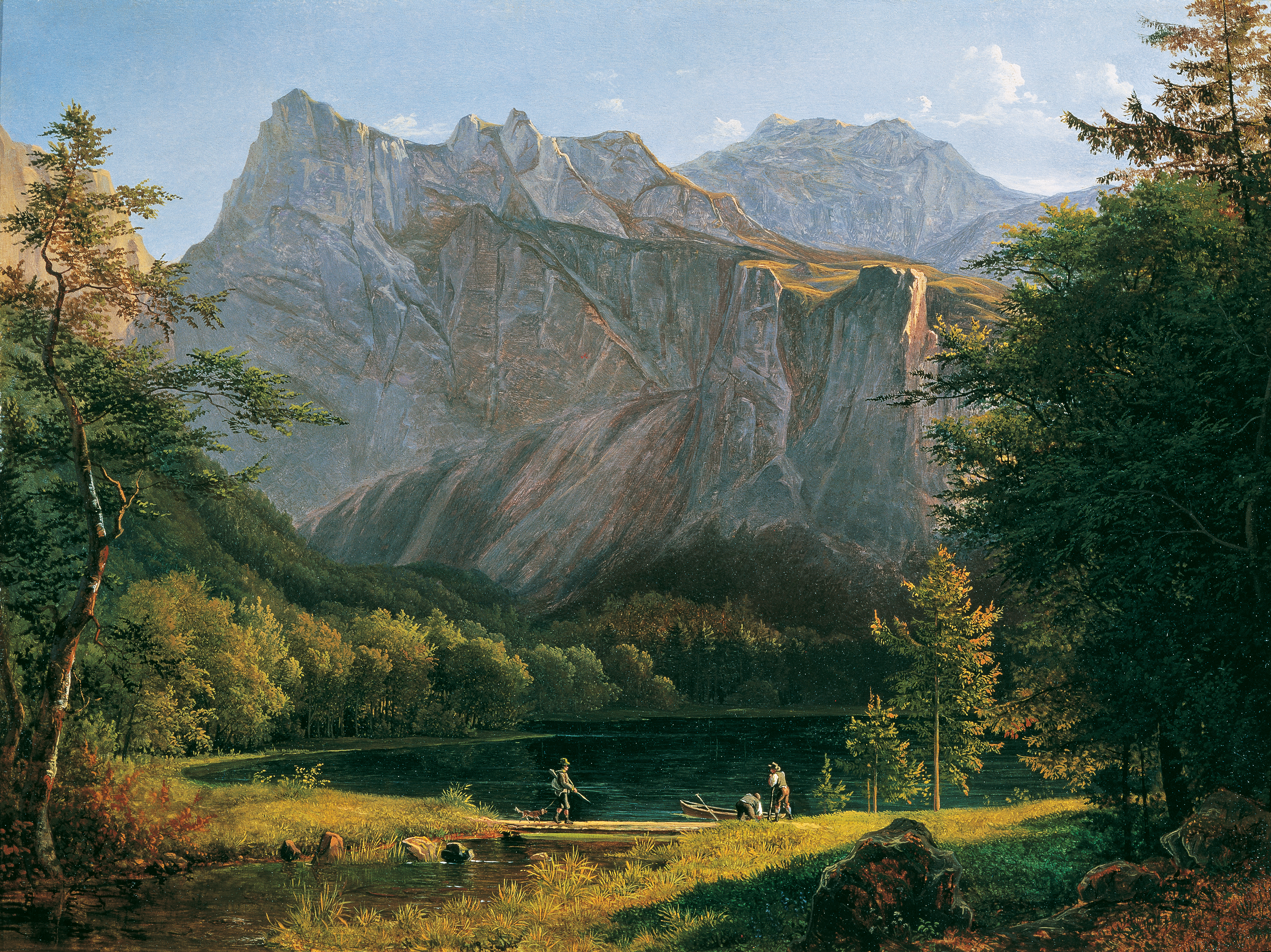

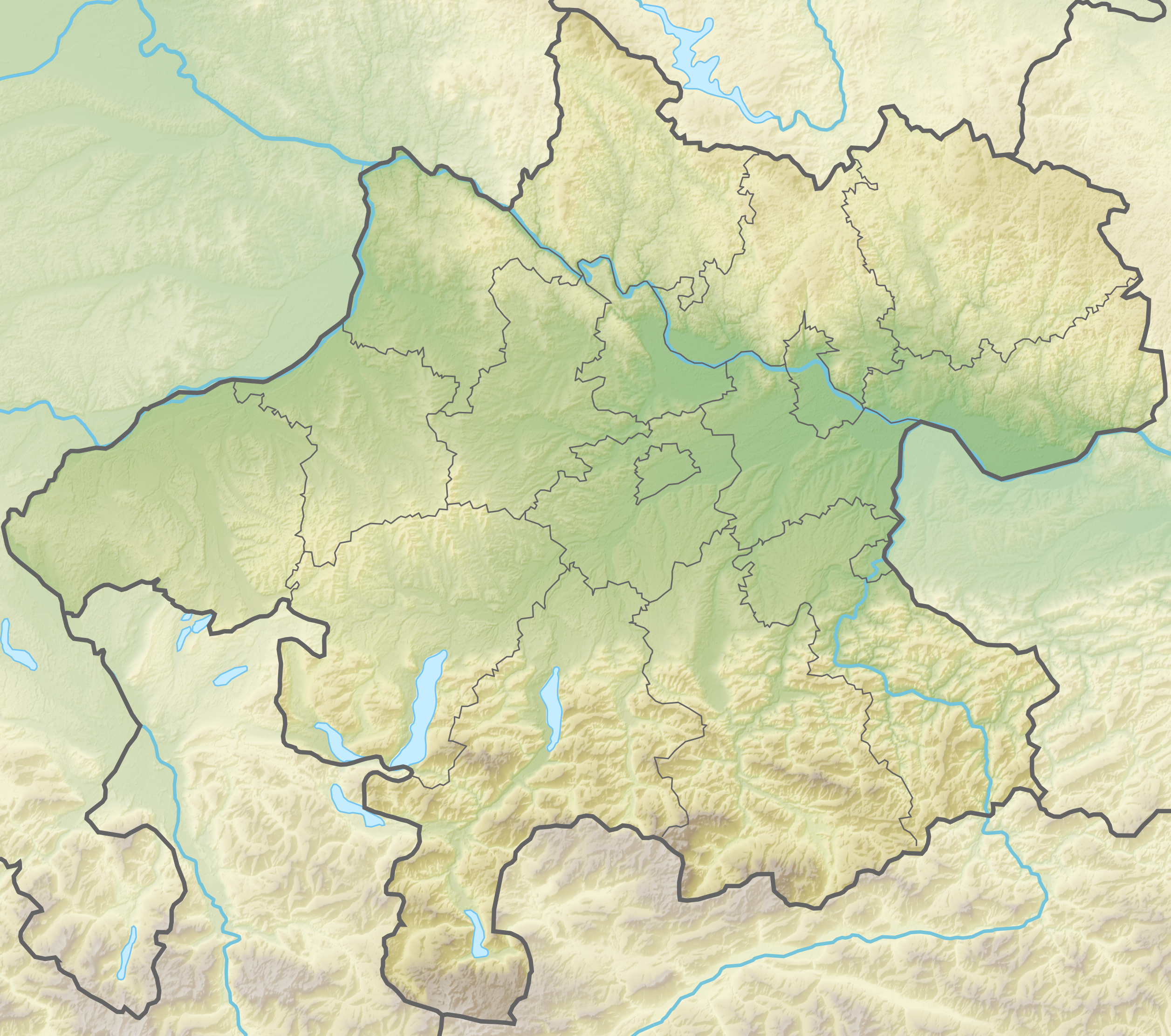
- Location within Upper Austria
- Location: Ebensee
- Coordinates: 47°49.85′N 13°39.18′E
- Lake type: Oligotrophic
- Primary inflows: Hirschbach, aquifers
- Primary outflows: Pfrillenbach
- Catchment area: 9.8 km^{2} (3.8 sq mi)
- Basin countries: Austria
- Designation: Nature reserve
- Max. length: 500 m (1,600 ft)
- Max. width: 400 m (1,300 ft)
- Surface area: 10 ha (25 acres)
- Max. depth: 18 m (59 ft)
- Water volume: 900,000 m^{3} (730 acre⋅ft)
- Residence time: 69 days
- Surface elevation: 723 m (2,372 ft)

The Langbathseen are two mountain lakes (Vorderer Langbathsee and Hinterer Langbathsee) in Upper Austria's part of the Salzkammergut, 8 kilometers (5.0 mi) from Ebensee. Its excellent visibility makes the Vorderer Langbathsee a popular diving site.
